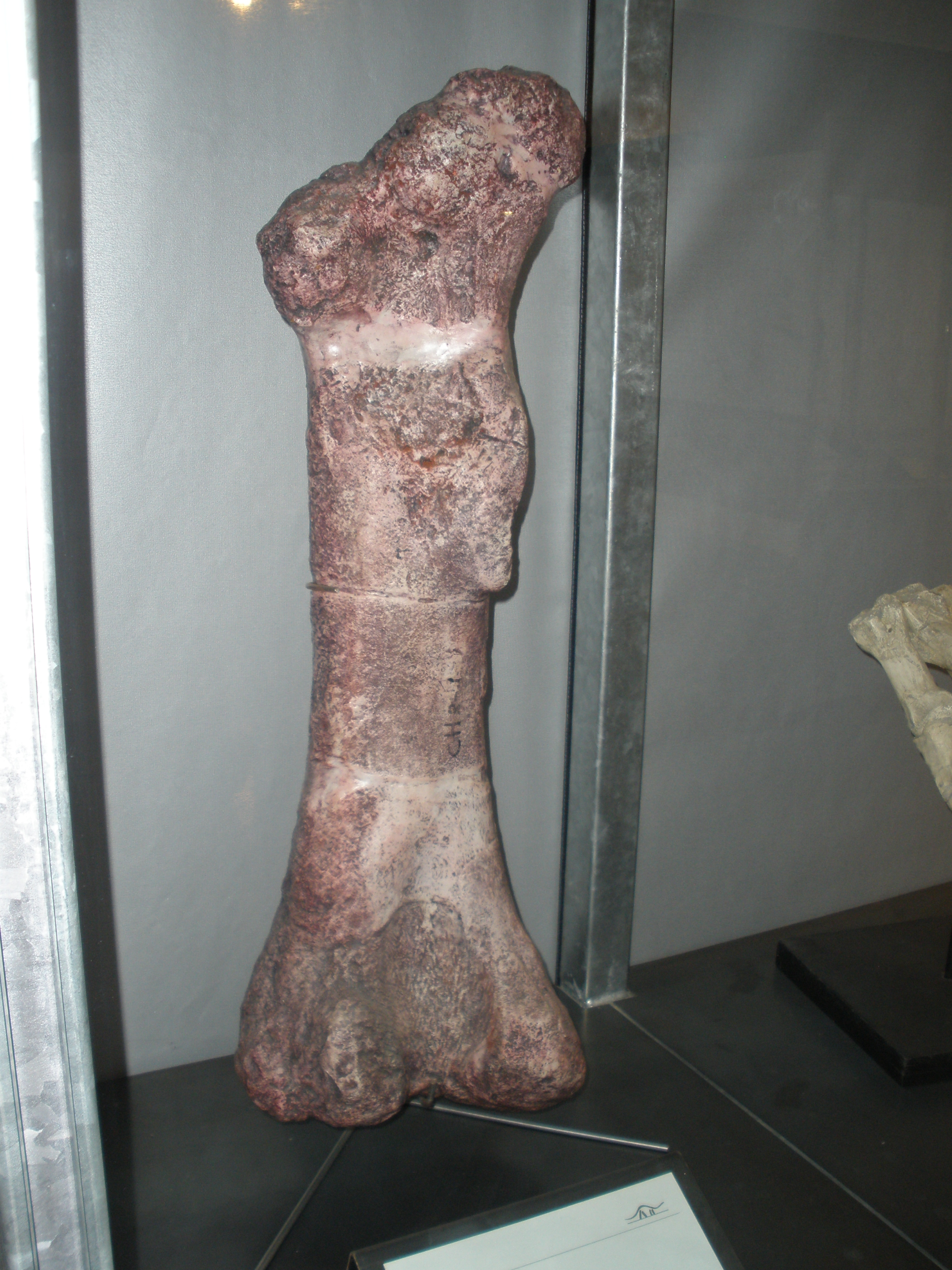
- Isanosaurus attavipachi thigh bone

Scientific classification
- Kingdom: Animalia
- Phylum: Chordata
- Class: Reptilia
- Clade: Dinosauria
- Clade: Saurischia
- Clade: †Sauropodomorpha
- Clade: †Sauropoda
- Genus: †Isanosaurus; Buffetaut et al. 2000
- Species: †I. attavipachi

Binomial name
- †Isanosaurus attavipachi Buffetaut et al. 2000

= Isanosaurus =

Isanosaurus Temporal range: Early Jurassic (likely Pliensbachian) 197–192 Ma

Genus of dinosaurs

Isanosaurus ("North-eastern Thailand lizard") is an extinct genus of sauropod dinosaur from the Early Jurassic (Pliensbachian stage) in Thailand. Isanosaurus was originally thought to have lived during the Late Triassic, which would make it one of the oldest known sauropods, but other authors questioned this age estimate, suggesting that the genus lived during the Jurassic period. In 2026, U-Pb zircon dating confidently supported that the rock layers bearing the fossils of Isanosaurus were deposited during the Sinemurian-Pliensbachian (197-192 MDA) stage of the Early Jurassic. The genus contains a single species, Isanosaurus attavipachi. Its exact relationships to other early sauropods remain unresolved due to the fragmentary known remains.

== Discovery and naming ==
The specimen was found in dark red sandstone of the Nam Phong Formation near the village of Ban Non Thaworn, in Chaiyaphum Province. When discovered in 1998, the skeleton had unfortunately been mostly eroded away. With regard to vertebrate fossils, the Nam Phong Formation is poorly explored: besides Isanosaurus, only two articulated ischia were found. Whether these ischia belong to Isanosaurus is unclear, because no pelvic bones are preserved in the holotype specimen.

Isanosaurus was described by French palaeontologist Éric Buffetaut and colleagues in 2000. The name is derived from Isan (north-eastern Thailand); the species name honours P. Attavipach, a supporter of palaeontological research in Thailand and former Director General of the Thai Department of Mineral Resources.

== Description ==
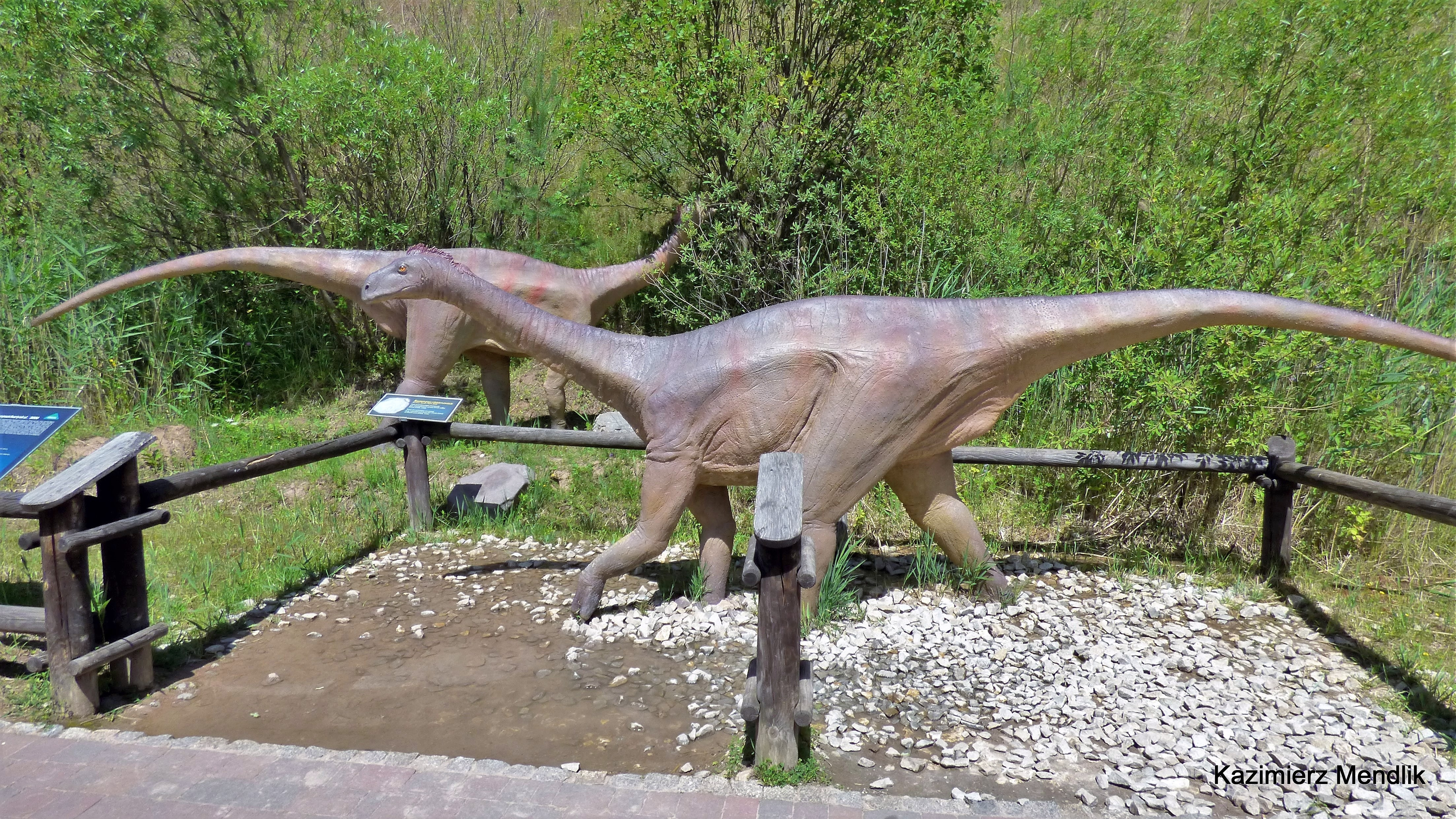
Models in Poland

The only specimen includes a neck vertebra, a back vertebra and part of a second, six tail vertebra, two chevrons, fragmentary ribs, the right sternal plate, the right shoulder blade, and the left thigh bone (femur). This individual may have measured 6.5 metres (21 ft) when alive; the thigh bone measures 76 centimetres in length. However, the vertebral neural arches have been found separated from the vertebral centra, indicating that these elements were not fused with each other; thus, this individual probably was not fully grown.

Early sauropodomorphs were primitively bipedal (two-legged). Isanosaurus, being one of the first sauropods known, already shows a quadrupedal locomotion (with all four legs on the ground). The legs were column-like, as indicated by the robust and straight thigh bone. In prosauropods, but also in the very basal sauropod Antetonitrus, the thigh bone was slightly sigmoidal (S-curved). Also, like in other sauropods, bony processes of the femur were reduced in Isanosaurus; most notably, the lesser trochanter was lacking.

Additional important features can be found in the vertebrae. The neck vertebrae were distinctly opisthocoelous (convex at the front and hollow at the back), forming ball-and-socket joints with neighbouring vertebrae. The tail vertebrae, on the other hand, were amphicoelous (concave at both ends). The dorsal neural spines were very high, like those of some later sauropods, unlike the low prosauropod neural spines. The lateral sides of the vertebrae were concave, but not deeply excavated (a structure known as pleurocoels) as in later sauropods.

== Phylogeny ==
Originally described as sauropod, it was later identified as a non-sauropod sauropodiform. The following cladogram shows the position of Isanosaurus within Massopoda, according to Oliver W. M. Rauhut and colleagues, 2020:

- Massopoda
  - - Eucnemesaurus
    - Riojasaurus
  - - Sarahsaurus
    - - Massospondylidae
        - - Yunnanosaurus
          - - Jingshanosaurus
            - Seitaad
        - - - Coloradisaurus
            - - Glacialisaurus
              - Lufengosaurus
          - - Massospondylus
            - - Adeopapposaurus
              - Leyesaurus
      - Sauropodiformes
        - Xingxiulong
        - - - Anchisaurus
            - Leonerasaurus
          - - Mussaurus
            - - Aardonyx
              - - Sefapanosaurus
                - - Meroktenos
                  - - Melanorosaurus
                    - - Camelotia
                      - - - Lessemsaurus
                          - - Antetonitrus
                            - Ingentia
                        - - Blikanasaurus
                          - - Pulanesaura
                            - - Gongxianosaurus
                              - - Schleitheimia
                                - - Isanosaurus
                                  - - Tazoudasaurus
                                    - Sauropoda
