= Sefapanosaurus =

Sefapanosaurus Temporal range: Early Jurassic 200 Ma

Scientific classification
- Domain: Eukaryota
- Kingdom: Animalia
- Phylum: Chordata
- Clade: Dinosauria
- Clade: Saurischia
- Clade: †Sauropodomorpha
- Clade: †Sauropodiformes
- Genus: †Sefapanosaurus; Otero et al., 2015

Type species
- †Sefapanosaurus zastronensis Otero et al., 2015

Extinct genus of dinosaur from the late Triassic to earlyJurassic

Sefapanosaurus was an early, herbivorous sauropodomorph dinosaur occurring in the southern regions of Gondwana some 200 million years ago in the Late Triassic or Early Jurassic. The sauropodomorphs were the dominant terrestrial herbivores throughout much of the Mesozoic Era, from their origins in the mid-Triassic (approximately 230 Ma) until their decline and fall at the end of the Cretaceous (approximately 66 Ma). A distinctive feature of this dinosaur is the cross-shaped astragalus or talus bone in its ankle. The generic name is derived from the Sesotho word sefapano, meaning ‘cross’ and the Greek word saurus, meaning 'lizard'. The specific name refers to Zastron, the type locality, where the specimen was discovered.

== History of study ==
This new genus was described in the 23 June 2015 issue of 'Zoological Journal of the Linnean Society' in an essay titled 'A new basal sauropodiform from South Africa and the phylogenetic relationships of basal sauropodomorphs'. A portion of the left foot and four partial skeletons, including several pieces of spine and limbs, were excavated from the Elliot Formation in the late 1930s in the Zastron district in South Africa, some 30 kilometres (19 mi) from the Lesotho border. Until a few years ago these formed part of the large fossil collection curated by the Evolutionary Studies Institute (ESI) at Wits University. When finally studied, the remains were thought to be those of the dinosaur Aardonyx. Further study determined that the remains represented a new dinosaur genus which was intermediate between early bipedal sauropodomorphs and the later giant quadruped sauropods, adding to the list of transitional sauropodomorphs from Argentina and South Africa, and further clarifying their diversification.

== Phylogeny ==
The following cladogram shows the position of Sefapanosaurus within Massopoda, according to Oliver W. M. Rauhut and colleagues, 2020:

- Massopoda
  - - Eucnemesaurus
    - Riojasaurus
  - - Sarahsaurus
    - - Massospondylidae
        - - Yunnanosaurus
          - - Jingshanosaurus
            - Seitaad
        - - - Coloradisaurus
            - - Glacialisaurus
              - Lufengosaurus
          - - Massospondylus
            - - Adeopapposaurus
              - Leyesaurus
      - Sauropodiformes
        - Xingxiulong
        - - - Anchisaurus
            - Leonerasaurus
          - - Mussaurus
            - - Aardonyx
              - - Sefapanosaurus
                - - Meroktenos
                  - - Melanorosaurus
                    - - Camelotia
                      - - - Lessemsaurus
                          - - Antetonitrus
                            - Ingentia
                        - - Blikanasaurus
                          - - Pulanesaura
                            - - Gongxianosaurus
                              - - Schleitheimia
                                - - Isanosaurus
                                  - - Tazoudasaurus
                                    - Sauropoda
