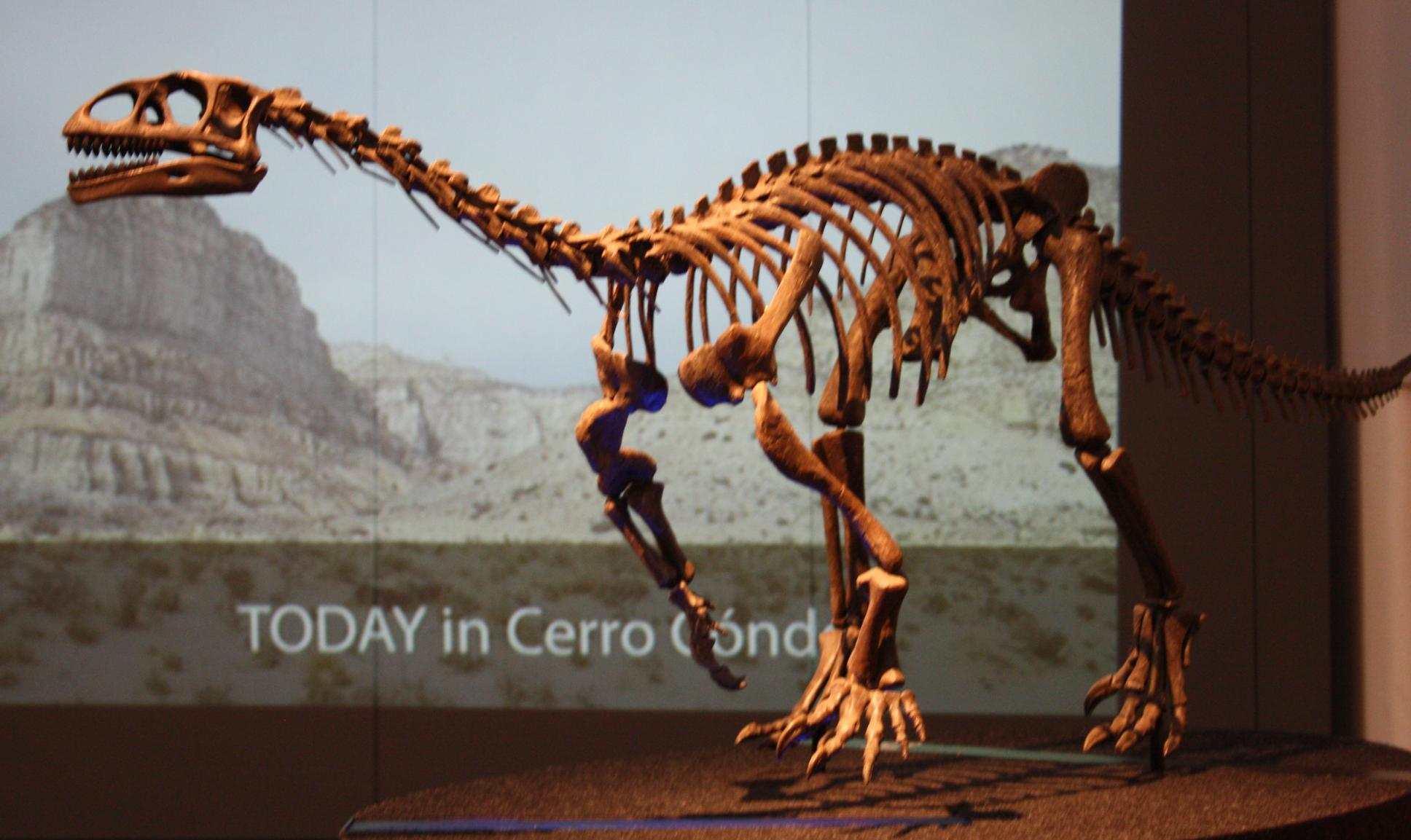
- Restored skeleton, photographed at the special exhibition "DINOSAURIER – Giganten Argentiniens" when stationed at the ForschungsMuseum Alexander König in Bonn in 2009.

Scientific classification
- Kingdom: Animalia
- Phylum: Chordata
- Class: Reptilia
- Clade: Dinosauria
- Clade: Saurischia
- Clade: †Sauropodomorpha
- Clade: †Sauropodiformes
- Clade: †Anchisauria
- Genus: †Leonerasaurus; Pol, Garrido & Cerda, 2011
- Species: †L. taquetrensis

Binomial name
- †Leonerasaurus taquetrensis Pol, Garrido & Cerda, 2011

= Leonerasaurus =

Leonerasaurus Temporal range: Early Jurassic ~199 Ma

Genus of sauropodomorph dinosaur from the Early Jurassic period

Leonerasaurus is a basal genus of sauropodomorph dinosaur. Currently, there is only one species known, named L. taquetrensis by Diego Pol, Alberto Garrido and Ignacio A. Cerda in 2011. The fossil, an incomplete subadult individual, was found in the Las Leoneras Formation in Argentina. This formation is probably Early Jurassic in age. Leonerasaurus was a small non-sauropod sauropodomorph, showing an unusual combination of basal and derived characters. This indicates that the evolution of early sauropodomorphs witnessed a great degree of convergent evolution.

== Discovery ==
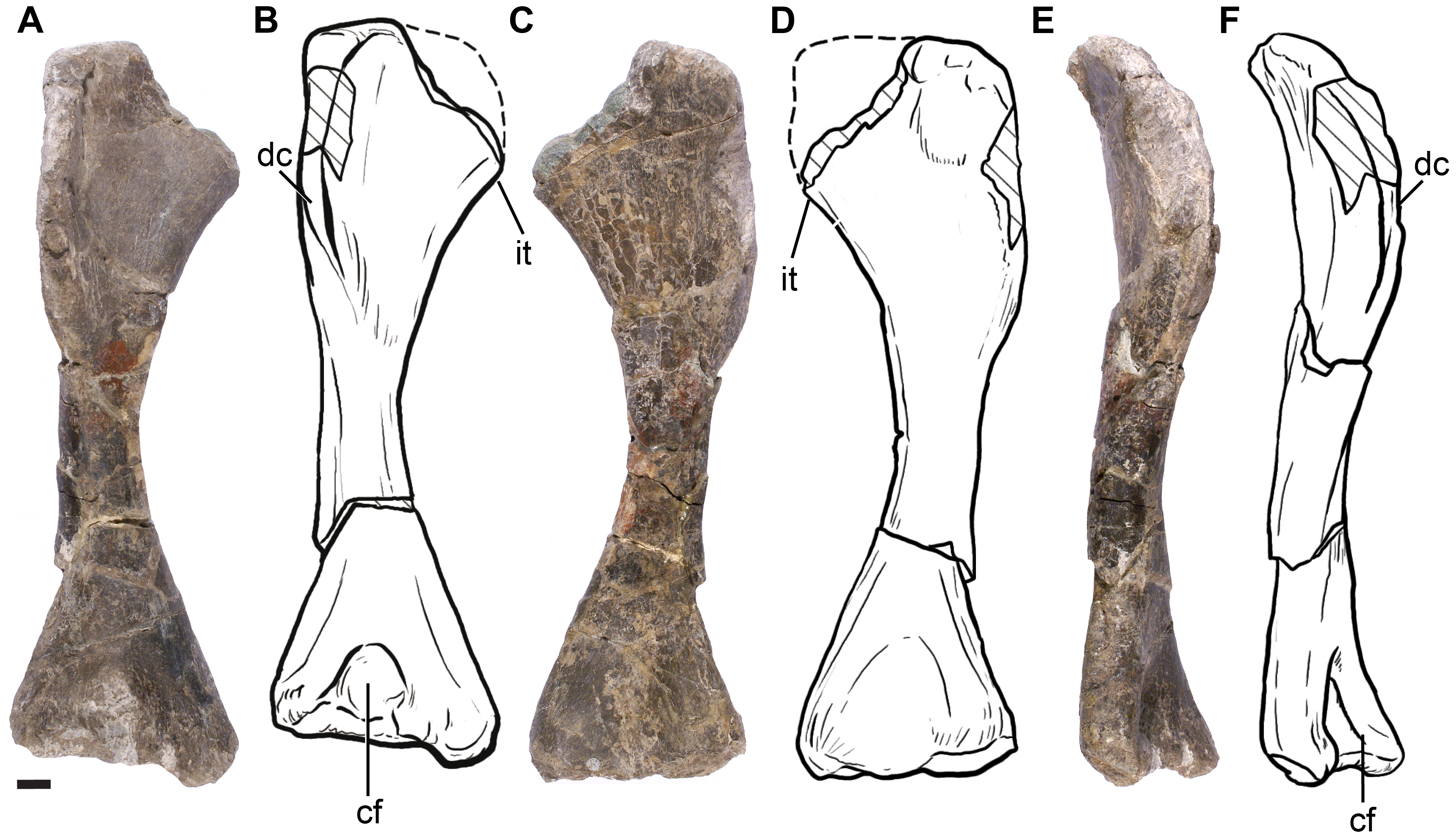
Right humerus in anterior, posterior, and lateral view

The fossils assigned to Leonerasaurus were found near Cañadón Las Leoneras (an affluent of the left margin of the Chubut river), southeast of Sierra de Taquetrén, Chubut Province, Central Patagonia, Argentina. This formation is probably early Jurassic in age, interpreted as Pliensbachian to Toarcian or late Sinemurian to Toarcian. The volcanic facies of the overlying Lonco Trapial Formation is certainly from the Middle Jurassic, so that the younger boundary of the Las Leoneras Formation is well constrained. However, a Late Triassic affinity cannot be rules out, because the lower constraint of the formation is not well-defined.

=== Etymology ===
The generic name is derived from Leoneras, in reference to the lithostratigraphic unit where this taxon was found, and saurus, "lizard" (Latinized Greek). The specific name taquetrensis refers to the Sierras de Taquetrén, where Las Leoneras Formation crops out in Central Patagonia.

== Description ==
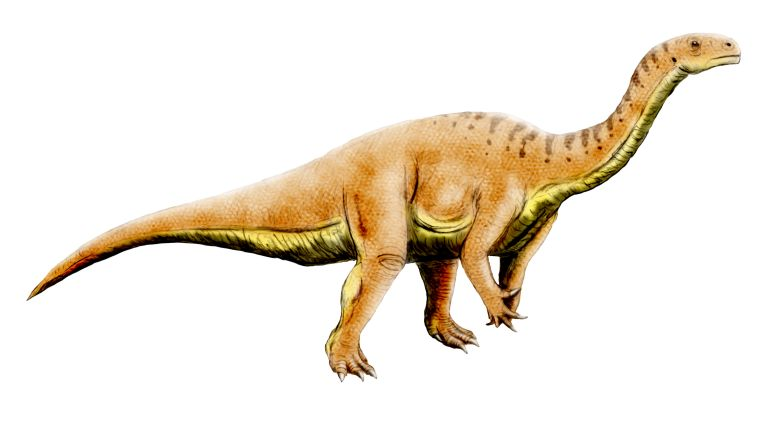
Restoration

Leonerasaurus taquetrensis is known from one incomplete individual. Parts of a dentary and some teeth, neck and trunk vertebrae, a sacrum, parts of the pectoral (shoulder) and pelvis (hip) girdle as well as several limb bones were found. Much of the remains were found in articulation. It was only 2.40 meters long, 1 m high and weighing about 70 kg.

=== Dentary and teeth ===
Of the skull only the anterior part of the right dentary was found. Near the area where it touches the contralateral element at the tip of the lower jaw (the symphysis) the bone is straight and only gently arched medially, as is seen in basal sauropods. More derived sauropods (eusauropods) have medially broadly arching symphyseal regione and anterior portions of the tooth row. The ventral (lower) edge of the dentary is damaged, but does not appear to be ventrally deflected at the symphysis as in some basal sauropodomorphs such as Plateosaurus. Also, a longitudinal ridge that is seen in some basal sauropodomorphs (e.g., Massospondylus, Coloradisaurus and Plateosaurus) is not preserved in Leonerasaurus. However, this may be related to the damaged state of the specimen.

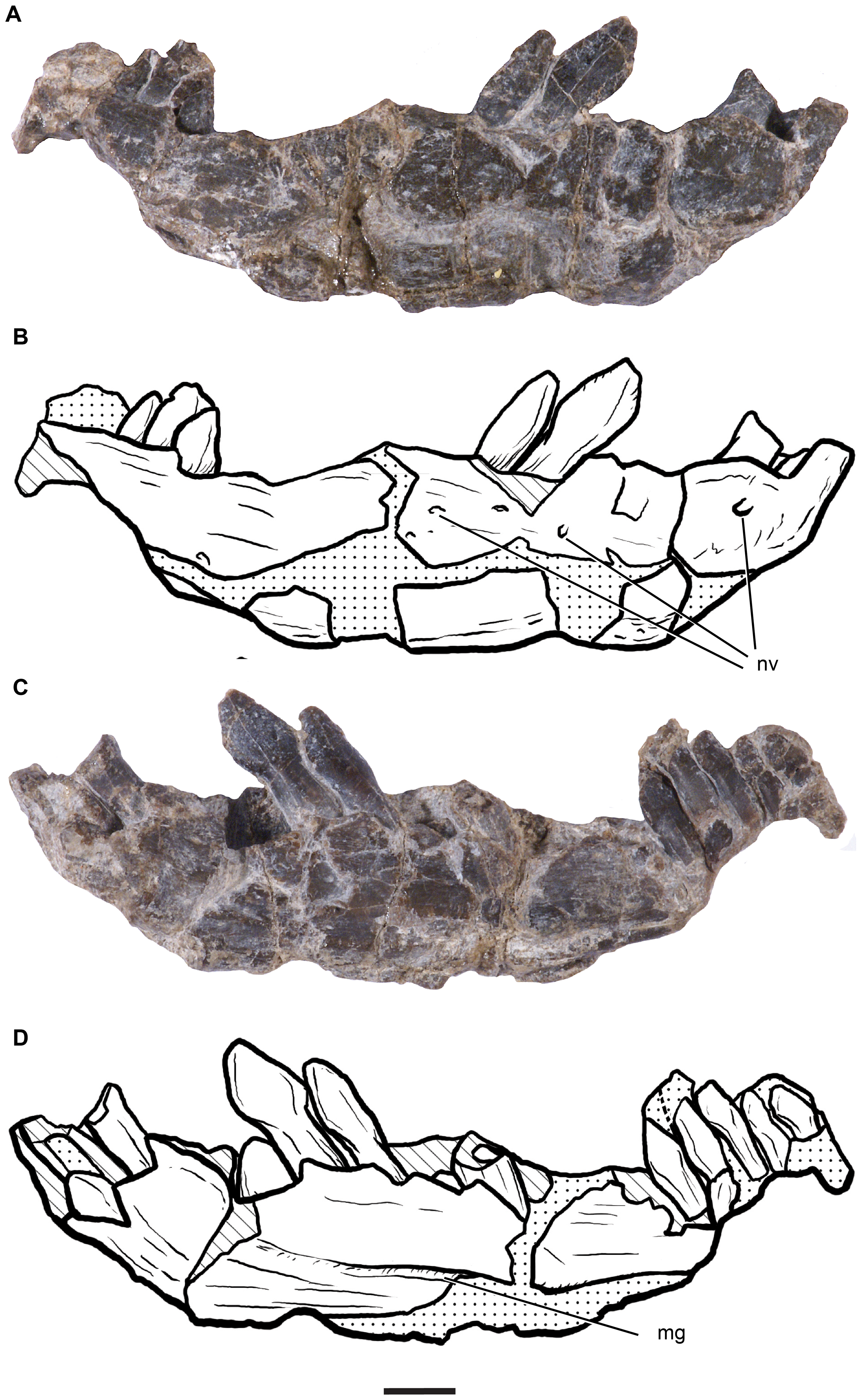
Lateral and medial view of the dentary

On the dentary, 13 teeth or tooth fragments were found. There are two empty alveoli, so that the total tooth count on one side was at least 15. Three teeth were found isolated near the dentary. The teeth and alveoli are angled forward (procumbent) by ~60°, similar to eusauropods, but also to juveniles of Mussaurus. Tooth height and width decreases from the front to the back, and neighboring teeth overlapping each other. The edges of the teeth in the front of the jaw likely were not serrated, or at least only at the crown tips. This is usually the case in eusauropods. Teeth further back in the dentary are nearly all damaged, but a not erupted tooth has large denticles similar to basal sauropodomorphs. This pattern of teeth without denticles in front, and teeth with denticles in the back of the lower jaw is also seen in juveniles of Mussaurus and Melanorosaurus. Also, in contrast to eusauropod teeth, there are no high-angle wear facets on the teeth of Leonorasaurus.

The anterior teeth are spoon-shaped, with the outer surface convex (bulging out), the inner one concave (hollowed out), again resembling basal sauropods. The surface texture, however, is more similar to basal sauropodomorphs, and not to sauropods.

=== Vertebrae ===
The neck of Leonerasaurus is known almost completely, only the atlas is lost. The nine remaining cervicals were found articulated with the first five complete dorsal (trunk) vertebrae. Additionally, a probable sixth dorsal and an articulated group of three mid-dorsals were found. Fragments of more posterior dorsals and of ribs were also recovered. The sacrum (fused vertebrae that form the core of the hip), consisting of four vertebrae, is nearly complete, but no bones of the tail was recovered.

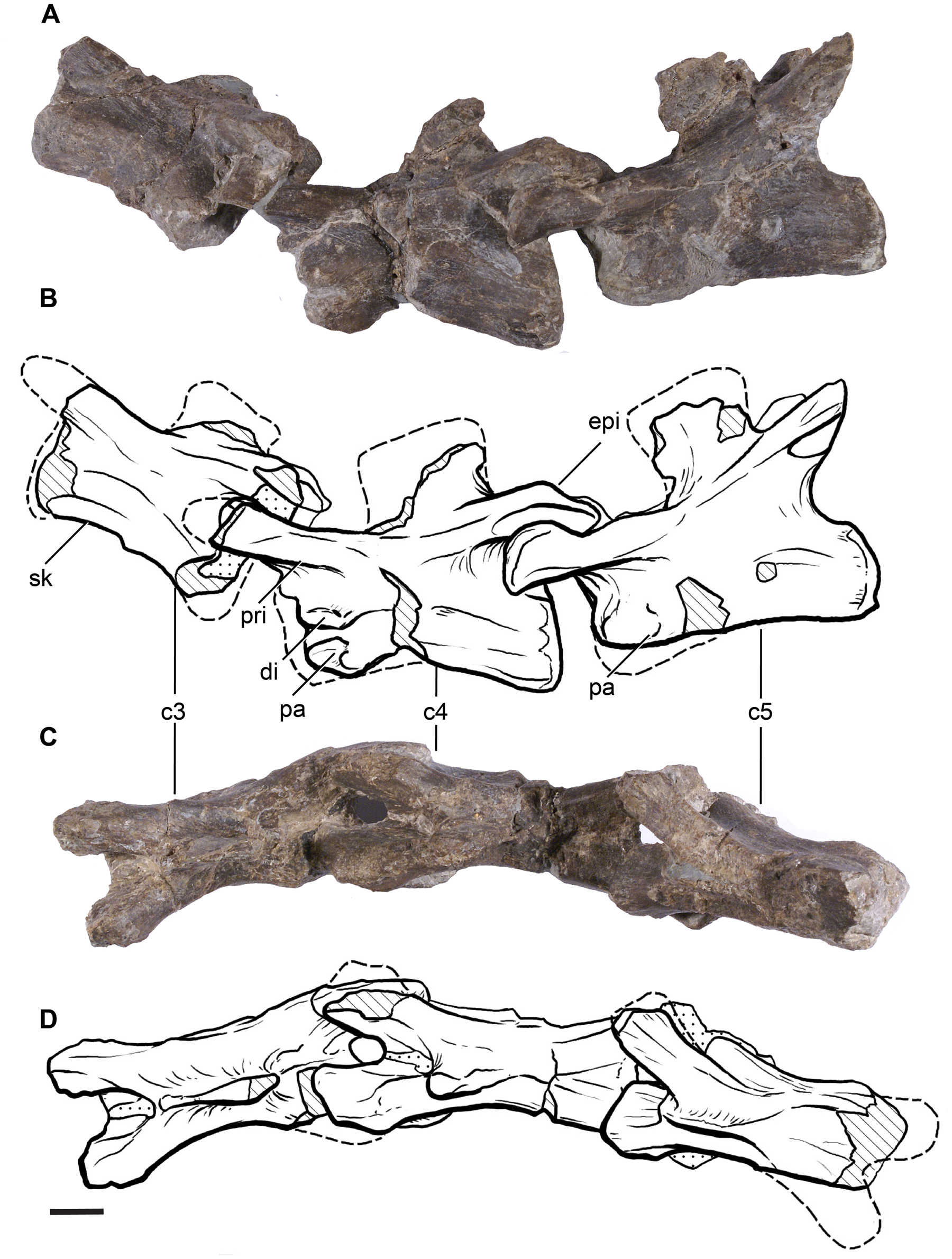
Cervical vertebrae

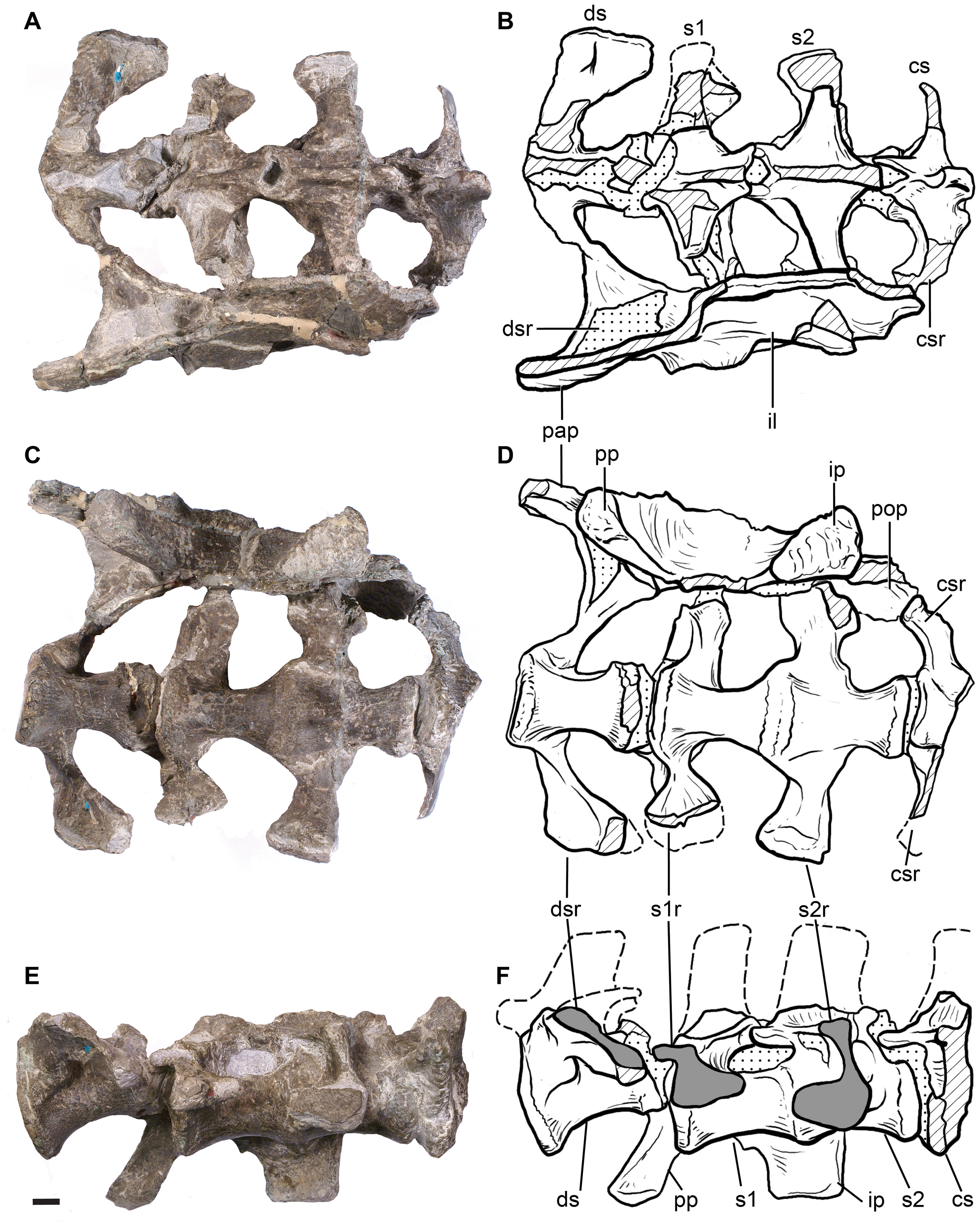
Sacrum in dorsal, ventral, and lateral view

The overall shape of the neck vertebrae is typical for basal sauropodomorphs, but Pol et al. interpret the remains of the neural arches to indicate a more sauropod-like shape. Some characters, however, show an intermediate development. In the trunk, the vertebrae show typical non-sauropod characters, such as relatively long and low neural arches with a narrow anterior ridge (the anteriormost dorsal vertebrae have slightly high neural arches), an anteriorly placed parapophysis (one of the articulation points for the ribs), and lack of or less strong development of certain laminae (thin ridges). The diapophysis (the second articulation for the rib) is also in the same position as in basal sauropodomorphs. A lamina connecting the diapophysis to the prezygapophysis on all dorsals, but not in no-sauropod sauropodomorphs, is present in the posterior dorsals.

== Phylogenetic position ==
Leonerasaurus appears to be belong into the Anchisauria, as the closest sister taxon to the group sauropods (following Yates) + Melanorosaurus (M. is seen as a sauropod by some researchers).

A cladogram after Pol, Garrido & Cerda, 2011, illustrates a possible placing of Leonerasaurus in Sauropodomorpha:

- Sauropodomorpha
  - Saturnalia
  - - - Pantydraco
      - Thecodontosaurus
    - - Efraasia
      - - Ruehleia
        - Plateosaurus
        - Massopoda
          - Riojasaurus
          - - - Massospondylus
              - - Coloradisaurus
                - Lufengosaurus
                - Gyposaurus
                - Yunnanosaurus
            - Anchisauria
              - Anchisaurus
              - - Aardonyx
                - - Leonerasaurus
                  - - Melanorosaurus
                    - Sauropoda
                      - - Antetonitrus
                        - Lessemsaurus
                      - - Kotasaurus
                        - - Vulcanodon
                          - Eusauropoda

The following cladogram shows the position of Leonerasaurus within Massopoda, according to Oliver W. M. Rauhut and colleagues, 2020:

- Massopoda
  - - Eucnemesaurus
    - Riojasaurus
  - - Sarahsaurus
    - - Massospondylidae
        - - Yunnanosaurus
          - - Jingshanosaurus
            - Seitaad
        - - - Coloradisaurus
            - - Glacialisaurus
              - Lufengosaurus
          - - Massospondylus
            - - Adeopapposaurus
              - Leyesaurus
      - Sauropodiformes
        - Xingxiulong
        - - - Anchisaurus
            - Leonerasaurus
          - - Mussaurus
            - - Aardonyx
              - - Sefapanosaurus
                - - Meroktenos
                  - - Melanorosaurus
                    - - Camelotia
                      - - - Lessemsaurus
                          - - Antetonitrus
                            - Ingentia
                        - - Blikanasaurus
                          - - Pulanesaura
                            - - Gongxianosaurus
                              - - Schleitheimia
                                - - Isanosaurus
                                  - - Tazoudasaurus
                                    - Sauropoda
