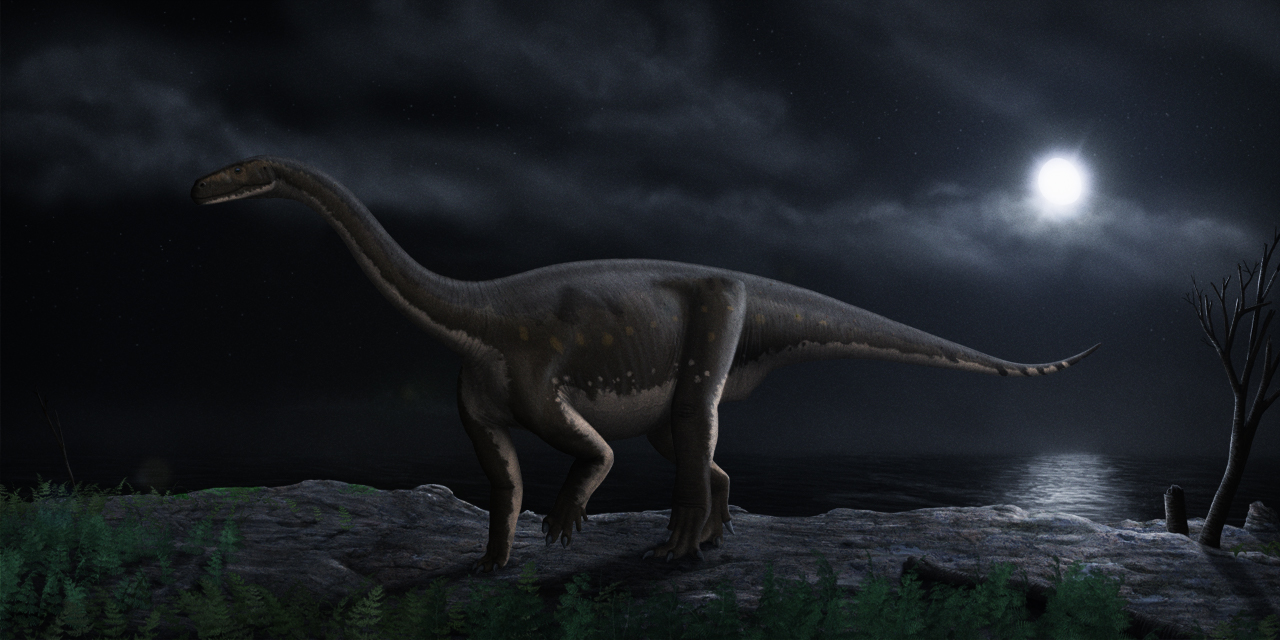
- Life restoration of M. readi

Scientific classification
- Kingdom: Animalia
- Phylum: Chordata
- Class: Reptilia
- Clade: Dinosauria
- Clade: Saurischia
- Clade: †Sauropodomorpha
- Family: †Melanorosauridae
- Genus: †Melanorosaurus; Haughton, 1924

Type species
- †Melanorosaurus readi Haughton, 1924

= Melanorosaurus =

Melanorosaurus Temporal range: Late Triassic ~216.5–201 Ma

Sauropodomorph dinosaur genus from the Late Triassic period

Melanorosaurus (meaning "Black Mountain Lizard", from the Greek melas/μέλας, "black", oros/ὄρος, "mountain" + sauros/σαῦρος, "lizard") is a genus of basal sauropodomorph dinosaur that lived during the Late Triassic period. An omnivore from South Africa, it had a large body and sturdy limbs, suggesting it moved quadrupedally. Its limb bones were massive and heavy like the limb bones of true sauropods.

== Description ==
Size comparison

Melanorosaurus had a skull which measured approximately 250 mm. The snout was somewhat pointed, and the skull was somewhat triangular when seen from above or below. The premaxilla had four teeth on each side, a characteristic of primitive sauropodomorphs. The maxilla had 19 teeth on each side of the jaw.

Melanorosaurus was around 8 metres (26 ft) long, with a weight of 1.3 metric tons (1.3 long tons).

== Discovery and species ==
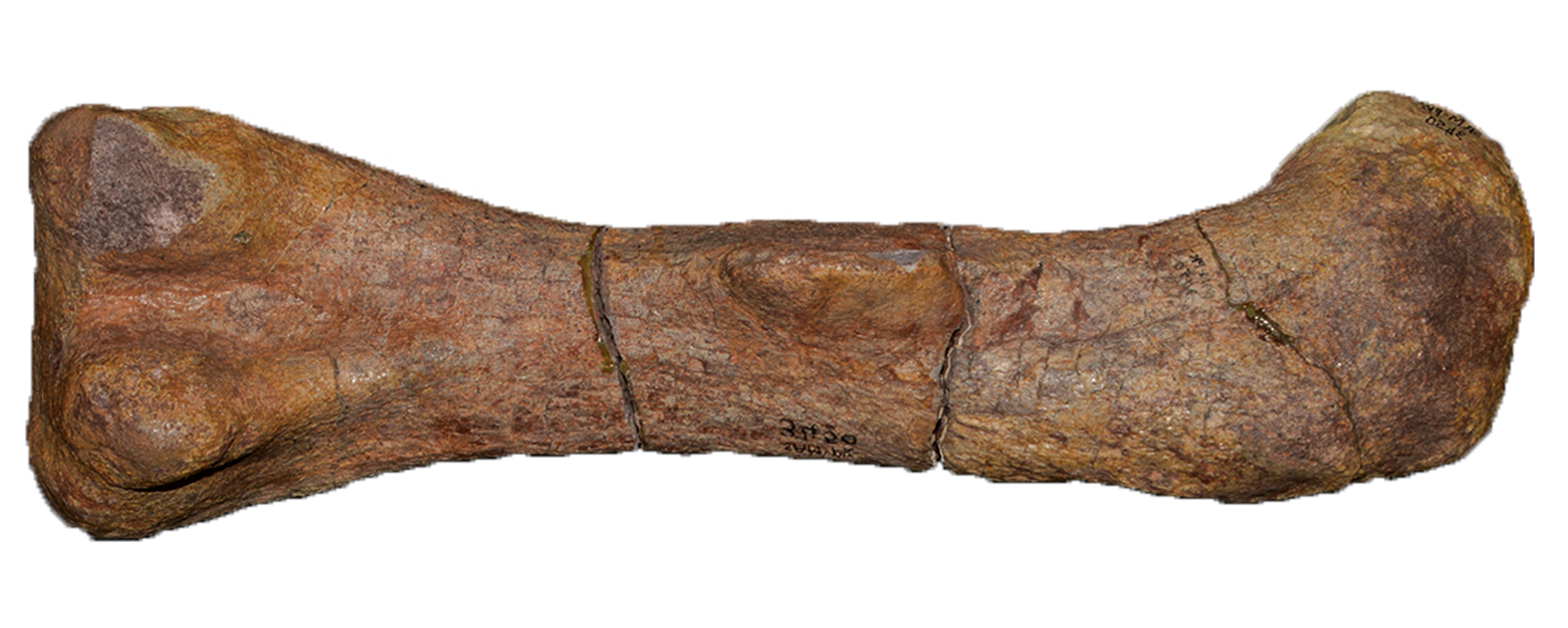
Left femur

The type specimens, syntypes SAM-PK-3449 and SAM-PK-3450, were discovered, described and named in 1924 by Sidney H. Haughton. They were collected from the Triassic Lower Elliot Formation, dating to the early Norian, on the north slope of the Thaba 'Nyama (Black Mountain) in Transkei, South Africa. In 2024, Melanorosaurus was redescribed and SAM-PK-3449 was designated the lectotype of the species. However, SAM-PK-3450 differs in many aspects from SAM-PK-3449 so was excluded from Melanorosaurus, representing a probable sauropodomorph.

Haughton also referred SAM-PK-3532 to Melanorosaurus, a partial skeleton discovered from a different locality than the lectotype. Nevertheless, it too differs from the lectotype in aspects of the ulna and ilium, thus it can only be regarded an indeterminate sauropodomorph for now. In 1985, Peter Galton suggested the referral of NMQR 1551, an exemplar of the postcranial remains of two individuals to M. readi, and in 2024, this was considered a strong possibility due to similarities with the lectotype specimen. However, the authors stressed that a detailed reassessment of the material was necessary before any formal referrals were to be made. The first complete skull referred to Melanorosaurus, NM QR3314, was described in 2007. However, this specimen comes from the Upper Elliot, unlike the Melanorosaurus type material and NM QR1551, rendering its referral to the genus untenable.

Melanorosaurus thabanensis was named in 1993 by Gauffre, based on holotype MNHN LES-16, a femur found in the Upper Triassic lower Elliot Formation. However, a recent review of the material demonstrated that the femur, along with six other bones, can't be referred to the genus Melanorosaurus, and a new combination (Meroktenos thabanensis) was created.

== Classification ==
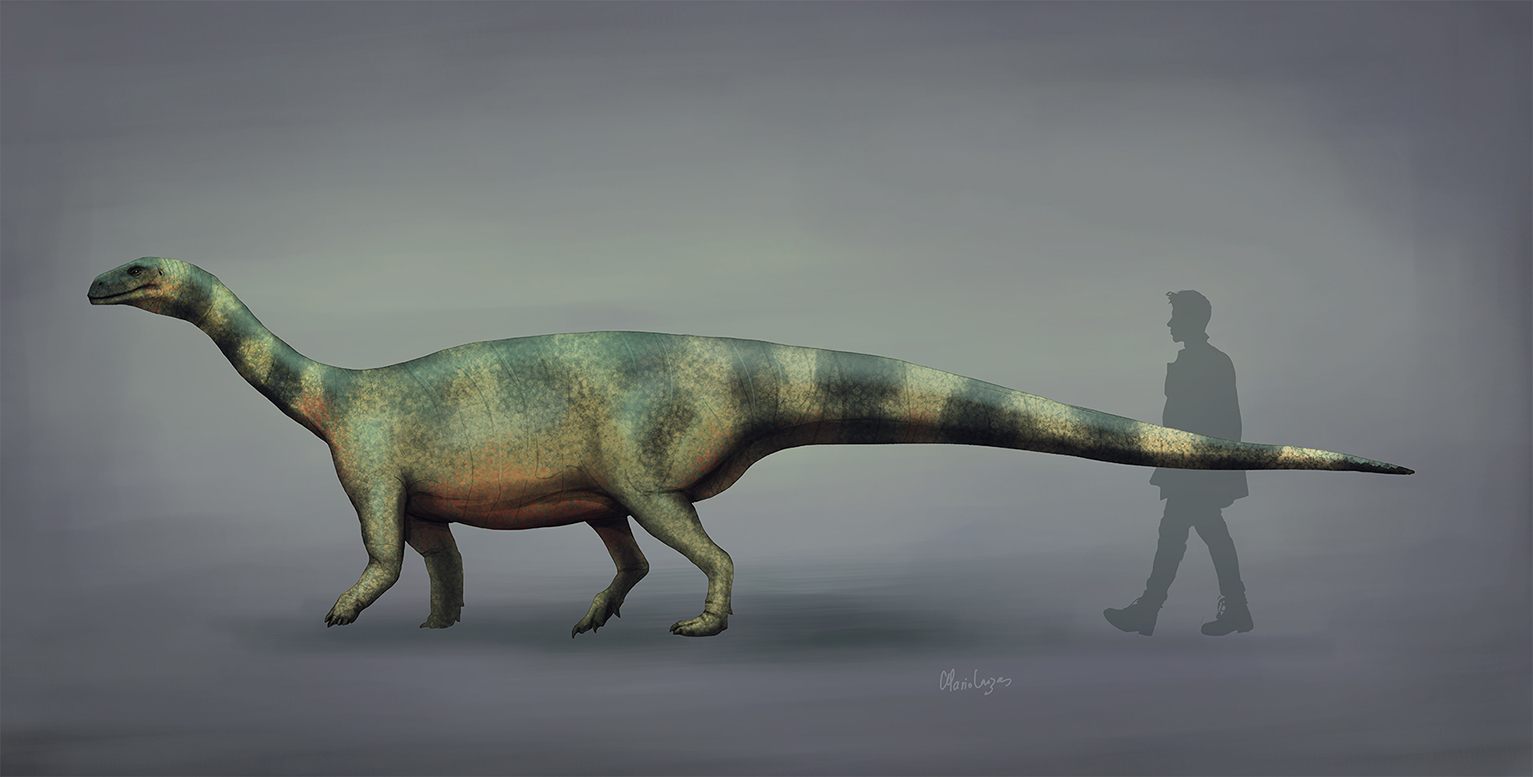
Life restoration

Melanorosaurus was once classified as a prosauropod, but Prosauropoda no longer appears to be a natural group. According to some definitions of Sauropoda, Melanorosaurus is an early sauropod. However, these definitions also take in many other former "prosauropods", and Adam Yates has proposed a definition of Sauropoda that will specifically exclude Melanorosaurus (Sauropoda as all sauropodomorphs closer to Saltasaurus than Melanorosaurus). This definition would allow Sauropoda to retain its traditional concept.

The following cladogram shows the position of Melanorosaurus within Massopoda, according to Oliver W. M. Rauhut and colleagues, 2020:

- Massopoda
  - - Eucnemesaurus
    - Riojasaurus
  - - Sarahsaurus
    - - Massospondylidae
        - - Yunnanosaurus
          - - Jingshanosaurus
            - Seitaad
        - - - Coloradisaurus
            - - Glacialisaurus
              - Lufengosaurus
          - - Massospondylus
            - - Adeopapposaurus
              - Leyesaurus
      - Sauropodiformes
        - Xingxiulong
        - - - Anchisaurus
            - Leonerasaurus
          - - Mussaurus
            - - Aardonyx
              - - Sefapanosaurus
                - - Meroktenos
                  - - Melanorosaurus
                    - - Camelotia
                      - - - Lessemsaurus
                          - - Antetonitrus
                            - Ingentia
                        - - Blikanasaurus
                          - - Pulanesaura
                            - - Gongxianosaurus
                              - - Schleitheimia
                                - - Isanosaurus
                                  - - Tazoudasaurus
                                    - Sauropoda
