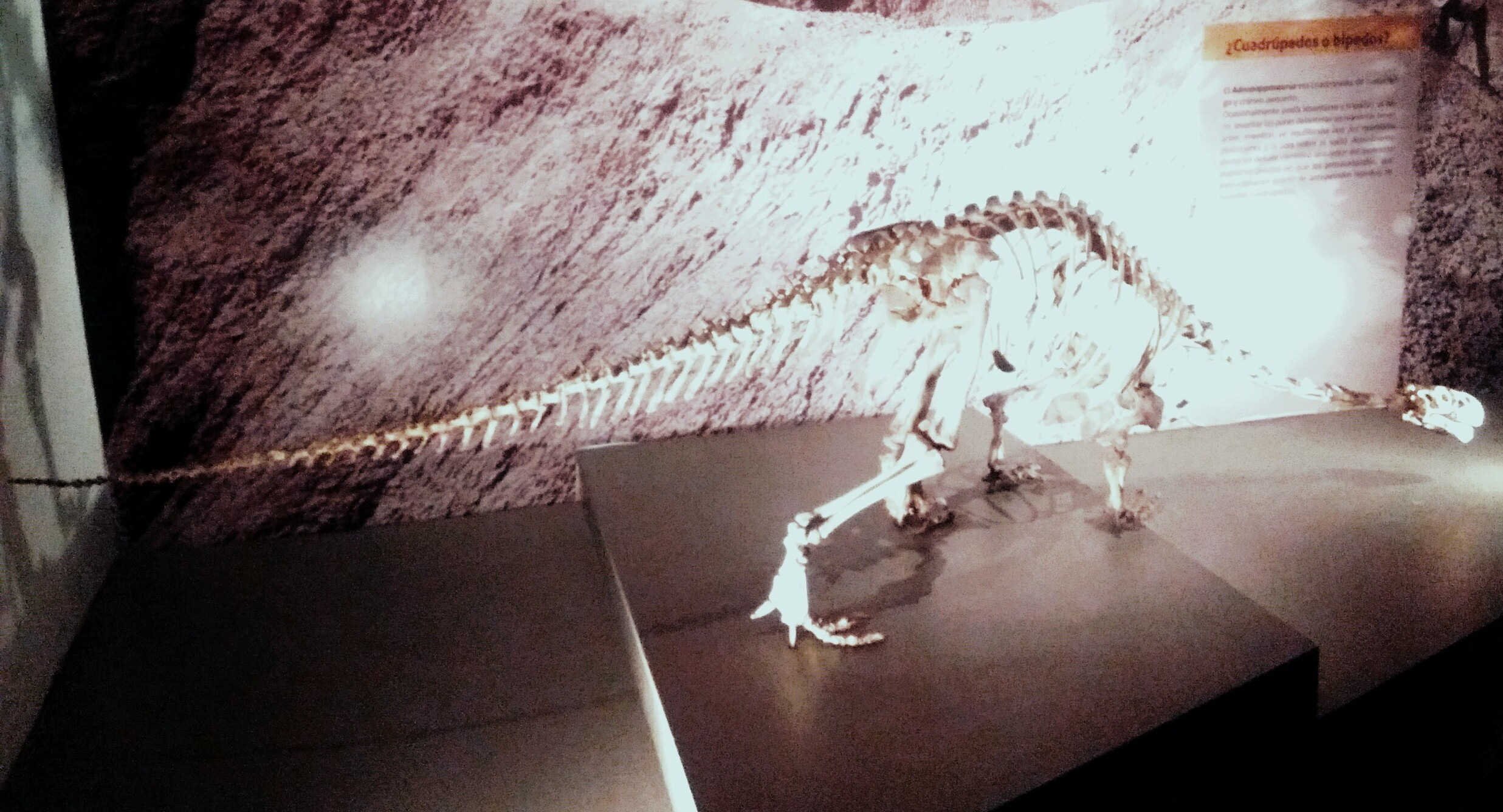
- Cast of the skeleton

Scientific classification
- Kingdom: Animalia
- Phylum: Chordata
- Class: Reptilia
- Clade: Dinosauria
- Clade: Saurischia
- Clade: †Sauropodomorpha
- Family: †Massospondylidae
- Genus: †Adeopapposaurus; Martínez, 2009

Type species
- †Adeopapposaurus mognai Martínez, 2009

= Adeopapposaurus =

Adeopapposaurus Temporal range: 200–183 Ma Early Jurassic

Extinct genus of dinosaurs

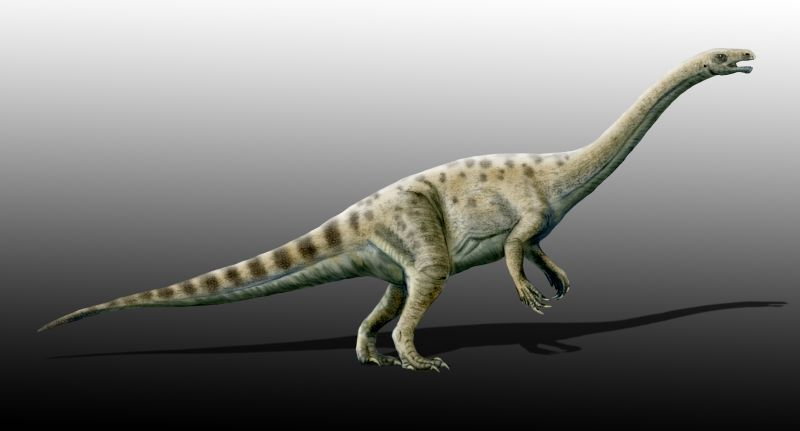
Life restoration.

Adeopapposaurus (meaning "far eating lizard", in reference to its long neck) is a genus of plateosaurian dinosaur from the Early Jurassic Cañón del Colorado Formation of San Juan, Argentina. It was similar to Massospondylus. Four partial skeletons with two partial skulls are known.

The type specimen, PVSJ568, includes a skull and most of a skeleton to just past the hips. The form of the bones at the tips of the upper and lower jaws suggests it had keratinous beaks. The fossils now named Adeopapposaurus were first thought to represent South American examples of Massospondylus; while this is no longer the case, Adeopapposaurus is classified as a massospondylid. Adeopapposaurus was described in 2009 by Ricardo N. Martínez. The type species is A. mognai, referring to the Mogna locality where it was found. The found fossils of Adeopapposaurus have provided crucial information about the different types of sauropod dinosaurs that were located in South America.

== Phylogeny ==
Size of Adeopapposaurus compared to a human.

The following cladogram shows the position of Adeopapposaurus within Massopoda, according to Oliver W. M. Rauhut and colleagues, 2020:

- Massopoda
  - - Eucnemesaurus
    - Riojasaurus
  - - Sarahsaurus
    - - Massospondylidae
        - - Yunnanosaurus
          - - Jingshanosaurus
            - Seitaad
        - - - Coloradisaurus
            - - Glacialisaurus
              - Lufengosaurus
          - - Massospondylus
            - - Adeopapposaurus
              - Leyesaurus
      - Sauropodiformes
        - Xingxiulong
        - - - Anchisaurus
            - Leonerasaurus
          - - Mussaurus
            - - Aardonyx
              - - Sefapanosaurus
                - - Meroktenos
                  - - Melanorosaurus
                    - - Camelotia
                      - - - Lessemsaurus
                          - - Antetonitrus
                            - Ingentia
                        - - Blikanasaurus
                          - - Pulanesaura
                            - - Gongxianosaurus
                              - - Schleitheimia
                                - - Isanosaurus
                                  - - Tazoudasaurus
                                    - Sauropoda

== See also ==
- 2009 in paleontology
