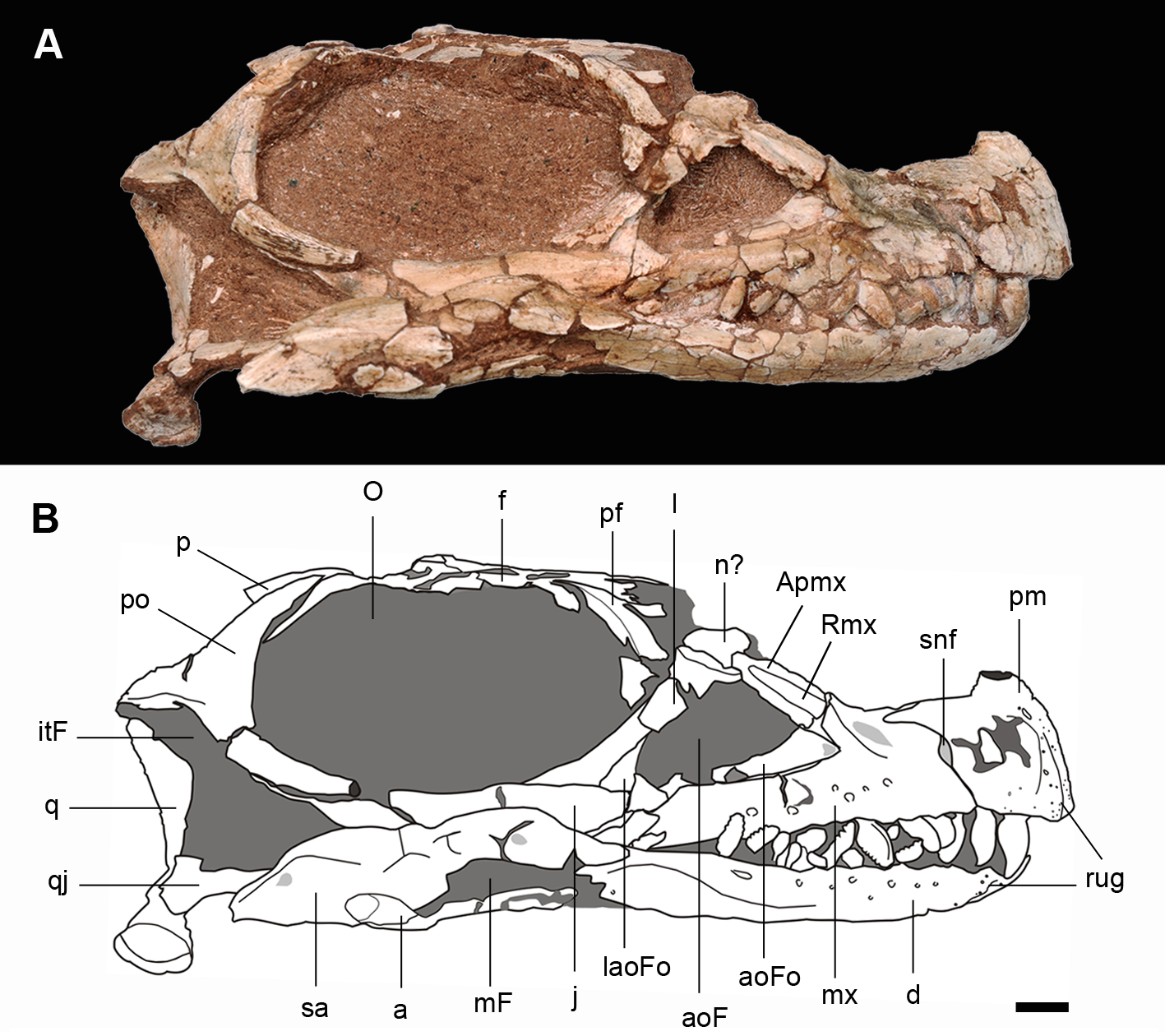
- Skull of Leyesaurus marayensis in lateral view

Scientific classification
- Kingdom: Animalia
- Phylum: Chordata
- Class: Reptilia
- Clade: Dinosauria
- Clade: Saurischia
- Clade: †Sauropodomorpha
- Family: †Massospondylidae
- Genus: †Leyesaurus; Apaldetti et al. 2011
- Species: †L. marayensis

Binomial name
- †Leyesaurus marayensis Apaldetti et al. 2011

= Leyesaurus =

Leyesaurus Temporal range: Early Jurassic ~202–176 Ma

Extinct genus of dinosaurs

Leyesaurus is an extinct genus of massospondylid sauropodomorph dinosaur known from the San Juan Province, northwestern Argentina.

== Description ==
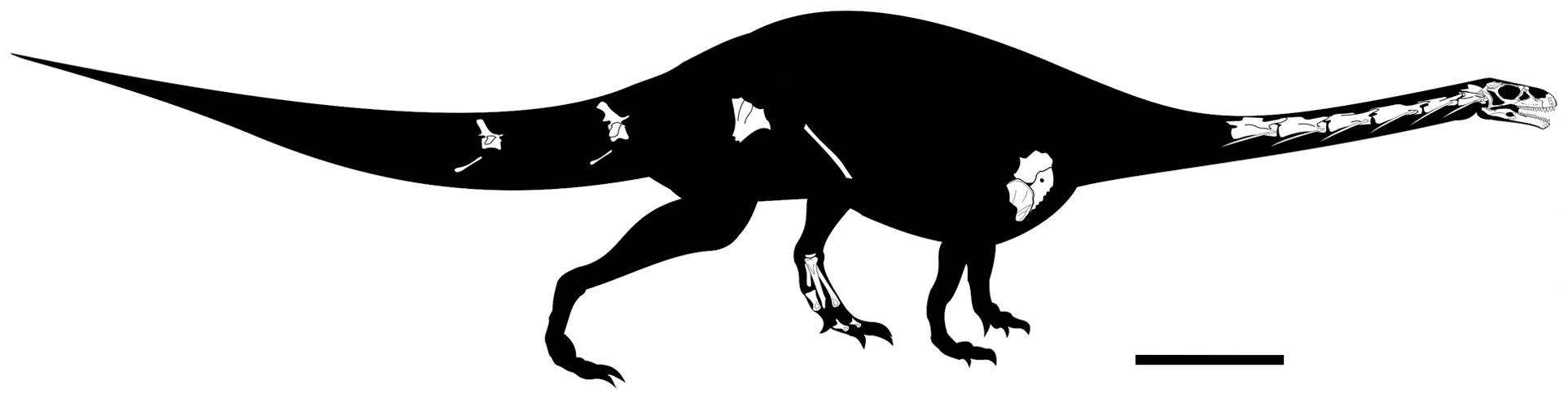
Silhouette reconstruction of the skeleton of L. marayensis

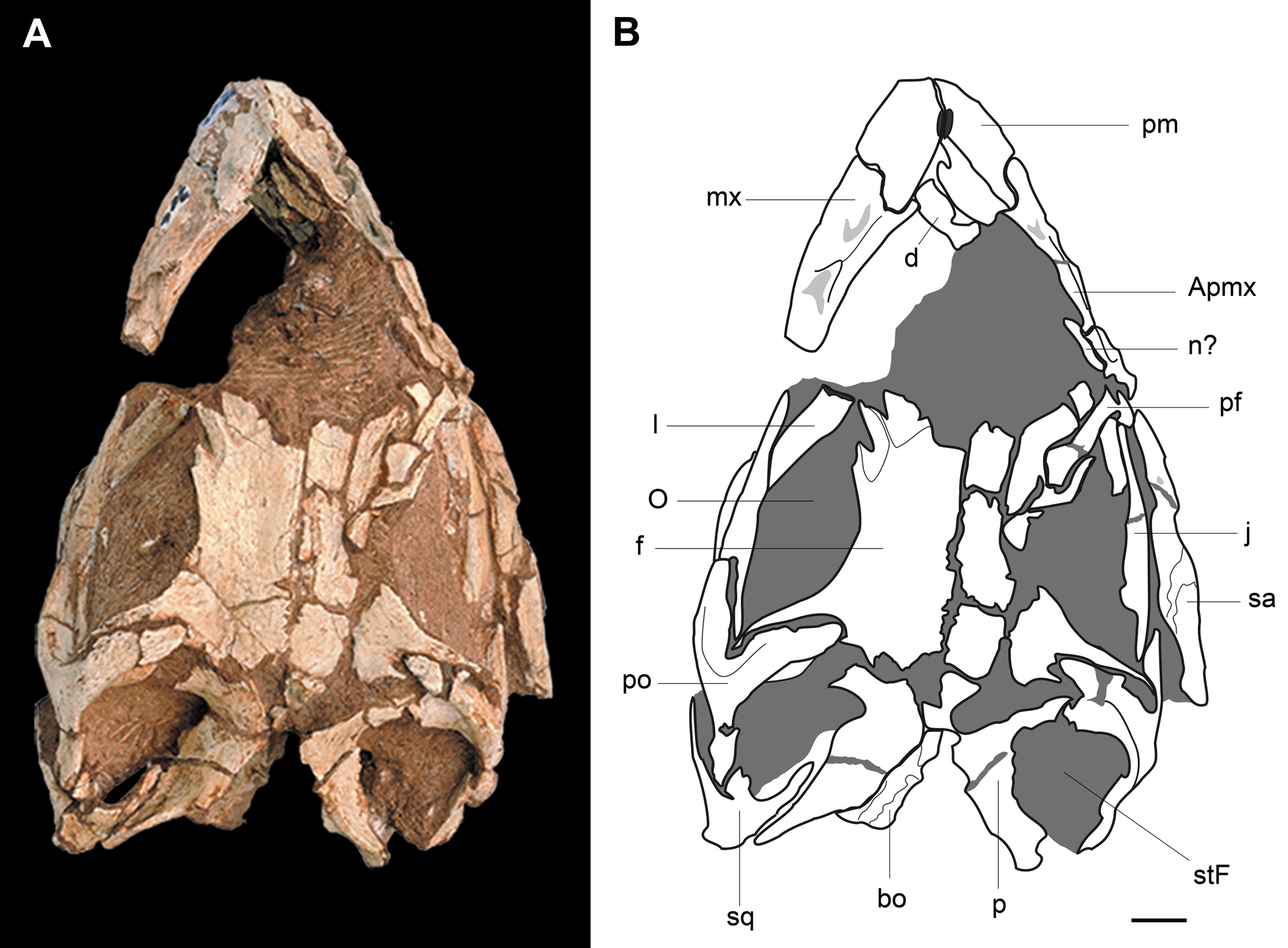
Skull of L. marayensis in dorsal view

Leyesaurus is known from the holotype PVSJ 706, a nearly complete skull with articulated mandible and some postcranial remains (vertebral column, scapular and pelvic girdles and hindlimb). The skull has a length of 18 centimeters, and Leyesaurus has been estimated to have been about 2.5 m (8.2 ft) in length. It was collected from the uppermost part of the Quebrada del Barro Formation of the Marayes-El Carrizal Basin, dating to the Lower Jurassic (based on the similarities between Leyesaurus and Lower Jurassic sauropodomorphs, like Massospondylus and Adeopapposaurus). Leyesaurus was found near the locality Balde de Leyes, in the Caucete Department of San Juan Province. Within Massospondylidae, Leyesaurus was found to be most closely related to Adeopapposaurus.

== Etymology ==
Size diagram of Leyesaurus marayensis

Leyesaurus was first named by Cecilia Apaldetti, Ricardo N. Martinez, Oscar A. Alcober and Diego Pol in 2011 and the type species is Leyesaurus marayensis. The generic name honors the Leyes family, inhabitants of the small town Balde de Leyes, who discovered the holotype and notified the paleontologists of the San Juan Museum, and saurus, Greek for "lizard". The specific name refers to the Marayes-El Carrizal Basin, where the holotype was discovered.

== Phylogeny ==
The following cladogram shows the position of Leyesaurus within Massopoda, according to Oliver W. M. Rauhut and colleagues, 2020:

- Massopoda
  - - Eucnemesaurus
    - Riojasaurus
  - - Sarahsaurus
    - - Massospondylidae
        - - Yunnanosaurus
          - - Jingshanosaurus
            - Seitaad
        - - - Coloradisaurus
            - - Glacialisaurus
              - Lufengosaurus
          - - Massospondylus
            - - Adeopapposaurus
              - Leyesaurus
      - Sauropodiformes
        - Xingxiulong
        - - - Anchisaurus
            - Leonerasaurus
          - - Mussaurus
            - - Aardonyx
              - - Sefapanosaurus
                - - Meroktenos
                  - - Melanorosaurus
                    - - Camelotia
                      - - - Lessemsaurus
                          - - Antetonitrus
                            - Ingentia
                        - - Blikanasaurus
                          - - Pulanesaura
                            - - Gongxianosaurus
                              - - Schleitheimia
                                - - Isanosaurus
                                  - - Tazoudasaurus
                                    - Sauropoda
