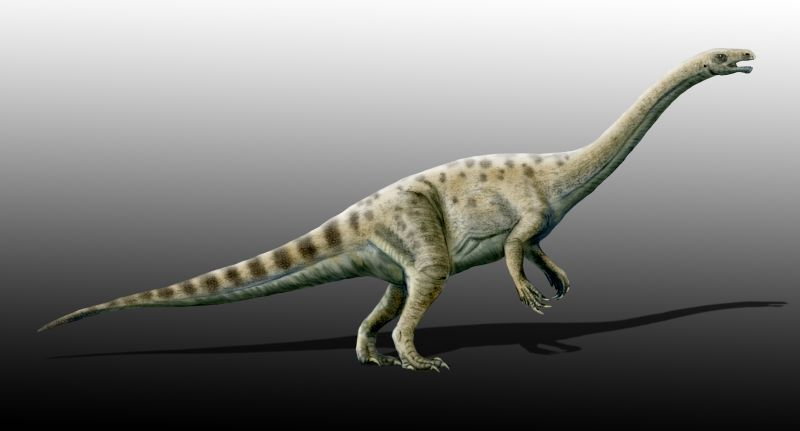
- An example of Massospondylidae, Adeopapposaurus

Scientific classification
- Kingdom: Animalia
- Phylum: Chordata
- Class: Reptilia
- Clade: Dinosauria
- Clade: Saurischia
- Clade: †Sauropodomorpha
- Clade: †Massopoda
- Family: †Massospondylidae; Huene, 1914

Type species
- †Massospondylus carinatus Owen, 1854

Genera
- †Adeopapposaurus?; †Coloradisaurus; †Glacialisaurus; †Hortalotarsus; †Ignavusaurus?; †Leyesaurus?; †Lufengosaurus; †Massospondylus; †Ngwevu; †Pradhania; †Sarahsaurus?; †Xingxiulong?

= Massospondylidae =

Massospondylids Temporal range: Late Triassic – Early Jurassic, 227–176 Ma

Extinct family of dinosaurs

Massospondylidae is a family of early massopod dinosaurs that existed in Asia, Africa, North America, South America and Antarctica during the Late Triassic to the Early Jurassic periods. Several dinosaurs have been classified as massospondylids over the years. The largest cladistic analysis of early sauropodomorphs, which was presented by Apaldetti and colleagues in November 2011, found Adeopapposaurus, Coloradisaurus, Glacialisaurus, Massospondylus, Leyesaurus and Lufengosaurus to be massospondylids. This result supports many previous analyses that tested fewer taxa. However, this analysis found the two recently described North American massopods, Sarahsaurus and Seitaad, and the South African Ignavusaurus to nest outside Massospondylidae, as opposed to some provisional proposals. Earlier in 2011, Pradhania, a sauropodomorph from India, was tested for the first time in a large cladistic analysis and was found to be a relatively basal massospondylid. Mussaurus and Xixiposaurus may also be included within Massospondylidae.

In 2019, a specimen previously assigned to Massospondylus from South Africa was re-examined and found to belong to a separate genus that was named Ngwevu.

== Phylogeny ==
Massospondylidae, which was first named by Huene in 1914, is a stem-based taxon. It was defined by Sereno as all animals more closely related to Massospondylus carinatus than to Plateosaurus engelhardti and Saltasaurus loricatus.

The following simplified cladogram is based on an analysis presented by Chapelle and colleagues in 2019.

- Massopoda
  - Anchisaurus
  - - - Jingshanosaurus
      - Seitaad
    - - Massospondylidae
        - Massospondylus carinatus
        - - - Ignavusaurus
            - Sarahsaurus
          - - Adeopapposaurus
            - Leyesaurus
        - - Coloradisaurus
          - Massospondylus kaalae
          - - Lufengosaurus
            - Ngwevu
      - - Yunnanosaurus
        - Sauropodiformes

Below is a simplified cladogram after Müller, 2019.

- Massopoda
  - Anchisaurus
  - - - Adeopapposaurus
      - Leyesaurus
    - - Massospondylidae
        - - Sarahsaurus
          - Xingxiulong
        - - - Pradhania
            - Massospondylus kaalae
          - - Massospondylus carinatus
            - - Lufengosaurus
              - Glacialisaurus
              - Coloradisaurus
      - - Yunnanosaurus
        - - Jingshanosaurus
          - - Riojasauridae
              - Riojasaurus
              - Eucnemesaurus
                - E. entaxonis
                - E. fortis
            - - Seitaad
              - Sauropodiformes

The following cladogram shows the position of Massospondylidae within Massopoda, according to Oliver W. M. Rauhut and colleagues, 2020:

- Massopoda
  - - Eucnemesaurus
    - Riojasaurus
  - - Sarahsaurus
    - - Massospondylidae
        - - Yunnanosaurus
          - - Jingshanosaurus
            - Seitaad
        - - - Coloradisaurus
            - - Glacialisaurus
              - Lufengosaurus
          - - Massospondylus
            - - Adeopapposaurus
              - Leyesaurus
      - Sauropodiformes
        - Xingxiulong
        - - - Anchisaurus
            - Leonerasaurus
          - - Mussaurus
            - - Aardonyx
              - - Sefapanosaurus
                - - Meroktenos
                  - - Melanorosaurus
                    - - Camelotia
                      - - - Lessemsaurus
                          - - Antetonitrus
                            - Ingentia
                        - - Blikanasaurus
                          - - Pulanesaura
                            - - Gongxianosaurus
                              - - Schleitheimia
                                - - Isanosaurus
                                  - - Tazoudasaurus
                                    - Sauropoda
