= Cañón del Colorado Formation =

Geologic formation in Argentina

- Stratigraphic range: Early Jurassic, 200–176 Ma
- Type: Geological formation
- Sub-units: Upper Pelitic Member
- Thickness: >148 m (486 ft)

Lithology
- Primary: Conglomerate
- Other: Claystone

Location
- Coordinates: 30.5°S 68.5°W
- Approximate paleocoordinates: 31.0°S 30.0°W
- Region: San Juan Province
- Country: Argentina
- Extent: Sierra de Mogna

Type section
- Named for: Colorado River
- Cañón del Colorado Formation (Argentina)

The Canon del Colorado Formation is an Early Jurassic geologic formation in the San Juan Province of Argentina. The formation comprises conglomerates and claystones and is exposed in the Sierra de Mogna. The sauropodomorph dinosaur Adeopapposaurus is known from this formation.

== See also ==
- List of dinosaur-bearing rock formations
- List of stratigraphic units with indeterminate dinosaur fossils
- Etjo Sandstone
