= Pagancillo =

Coordinates: 29°34′S 68°03′W

- Municipality and village
- Interactive map of Pagancillo
- Country: Argentina
- Province: La Rioja Province
- Time zone: UTC−3 (ART)

Pagancillo is a municipality and village in La Rioja Province in northwestern Argentina.
