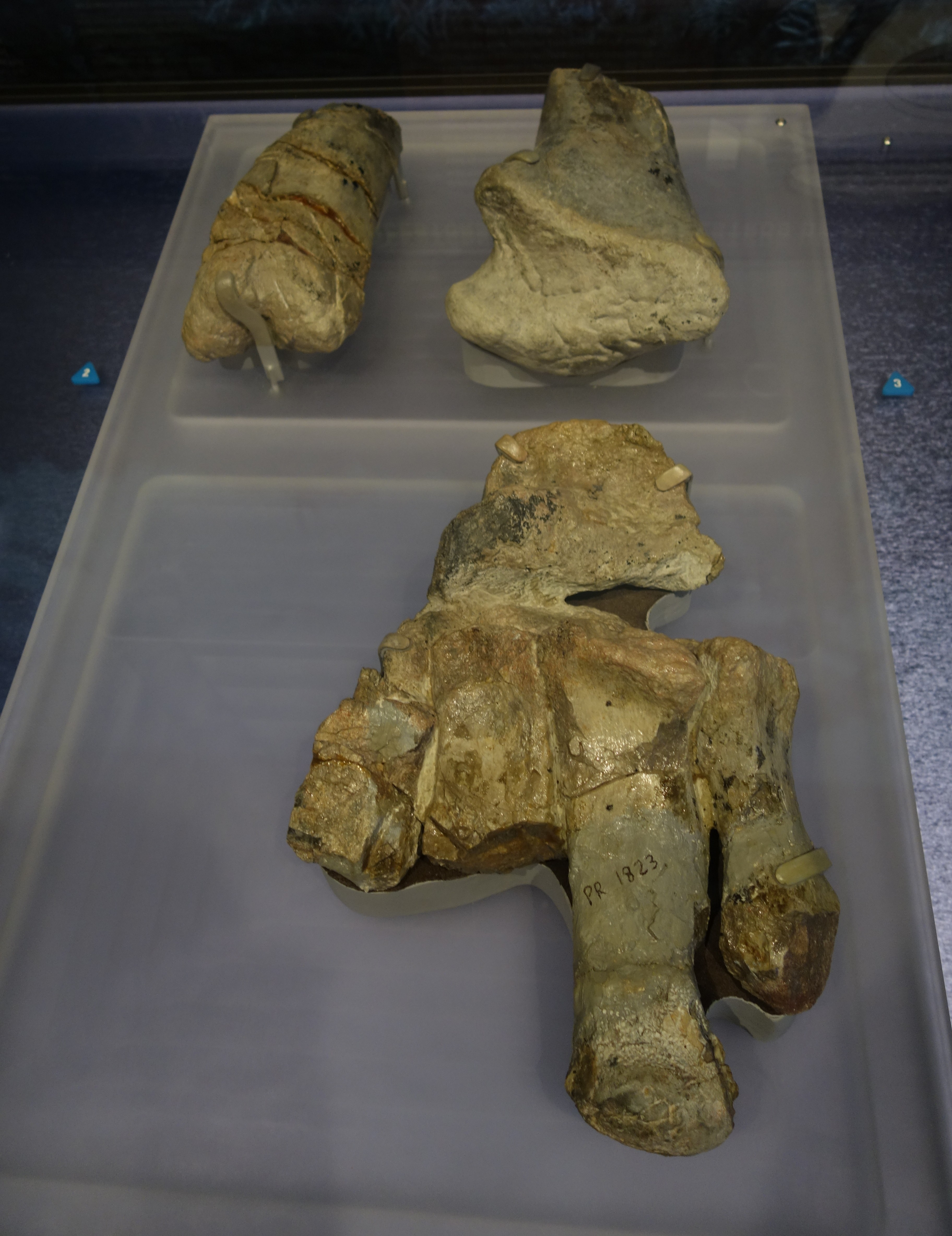
- Holotype leg bones, Field Museum of Natural History

Scientific classification
- Kingdom: Animalia
- Phylum: Chordata
- Class: Reptilia
- Clade: Dinosauria
- Clade: Saurischia
- Clade: †Sauropodomorpha
- Family: †Massospondylidae
- Genus: †Glacialisaurus; Smith & Pol, 2007

Type species
- †Glacialisaurus hammeri Smith & Pol, 2007

= Glacialisaurus =

Glacialisaurus Temporal range: Pliensbachian, 186–182 Ma

Extinct genus of dinosaurs

Glacialisaurus is a genus of sauropodomorph dinosaur from the Early Jurassic period of Antarctica. It is known from two specimens; the holotype (name-bearing specimen), a partial tarsus (ankle) and metatarsus, and a partial left femur (thigh bone). The fossils were collected by a team led by paleontologist William R. Hammer during a 1990–91 field expedition to the central region of the Transantarctic Mountains. They come from sedimentary rocks of the Hanson Formation and date to the Pliensbachian stage of the Early Jurassic, around 186 to 182 million years ago. The fossils were described in 2007, and made the basis of the new genus and species Glacialisaurus hammeri. The genus name translates as “icy” or "frozen lizard”, and the specific name honors Hammer.

This dinosaur has been classified as a massospondylid, a group of medium-sized, basal (early diverging or "primitive") sauropodomorphs that existed during the Late Triassic and Early Jurassic on every continent except Australia. Its length has been estimated at 6.2 m (20 ft). Glacialisaurus was a large herbivorous dinosaur, though it was average sized for a massospondylid. Glacialisaurus was distinct from other sauropodomorphs in features such as having a robust medial epicondylar ridge on the lower femur, a robust adductor ridge extending from the upper end of the femoral medial condyle, and a second metatarsal with a front border that is weakly convex in the upper end.

== Discovery and naming ==
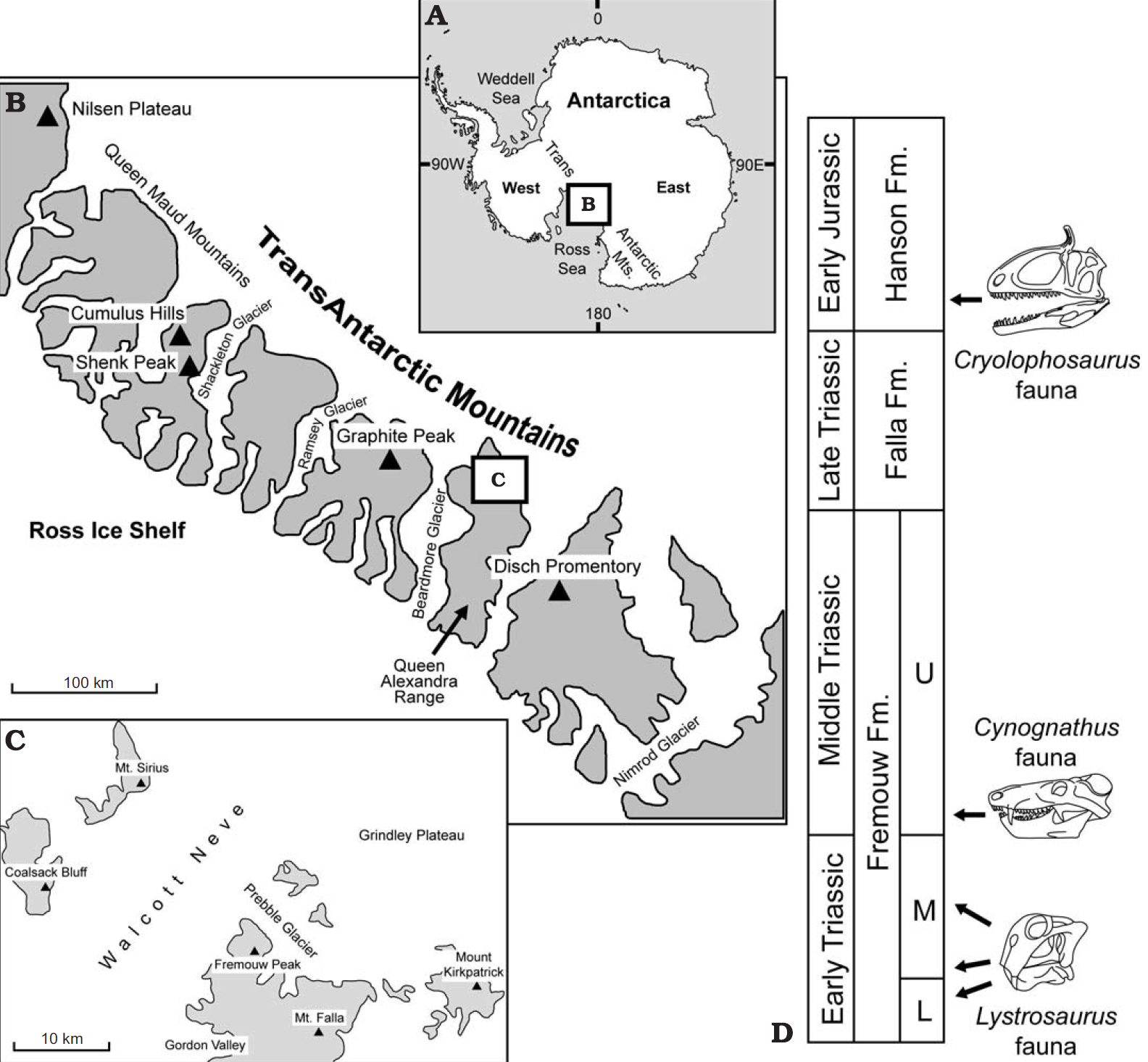
Map of the Mount Kirkpatrick fossil location in Antarctica where Glacialisaurus was found (C)

Fossils of a sauropodomorph dinosaur were discovered by a field team from Augustana College led by paleontologist William R. Hammer during 1990–91 fieldwork in the lower Hanson Formation of Mount Kirkpatrick in the Central Transantarctic Mountains of Antarctica, dating to the Early Jurassic. The fossils were from two different individuals: elements of the right ankle and metatarsus such as the astragalus, two tarsals and four metatarsals preserved in articulation (specimen FMNH PR1823), and the lower part of a left femur (FMNH PR1822, a thigh bone), ending just after the dissipation of the medial epicondylar crest (an extension of bone at the bottom of the femur that articulates with the tibia).

Several other fossils were collected from the same site, including fossils of the carnivorous theropod dinosaur Cryolophosaurus, a pterosaur humerus (upper arm bone), and a large tooth of a tritylodont, all found at an elevation of about 4,100 m (13,500 ft). The right ankle and tarsus were preserved in a 1 m (3.3 ft) thick layer of strata, while the femur was preserved at the surface weathering next to the Cryolophosaurus specimen. The fossils were sent to the Field Museum of Natural History in Chicago, USA, and were first reported in 1994. This report speculated that cervical vertebrae from Cryolophosaurus found nearby also belonged to the sauropodomorph, but this has since been disproven.

The fossils were described by the paleontologists Nathan Smith and Diego Pol, who named the new genus and species Glacialisaurus hammeri, with FMNH PR1823 as holotype specimen. The generic name is derived from the Latin root glacialis meaning 'icy' after its discovery in the Beardmore Glacier region in the Central Transantarctic Mountains and the word sauros meaning 'lizard'. The specific name honors Hammer for his contributions to Antarctic paleontology.

== Description ==
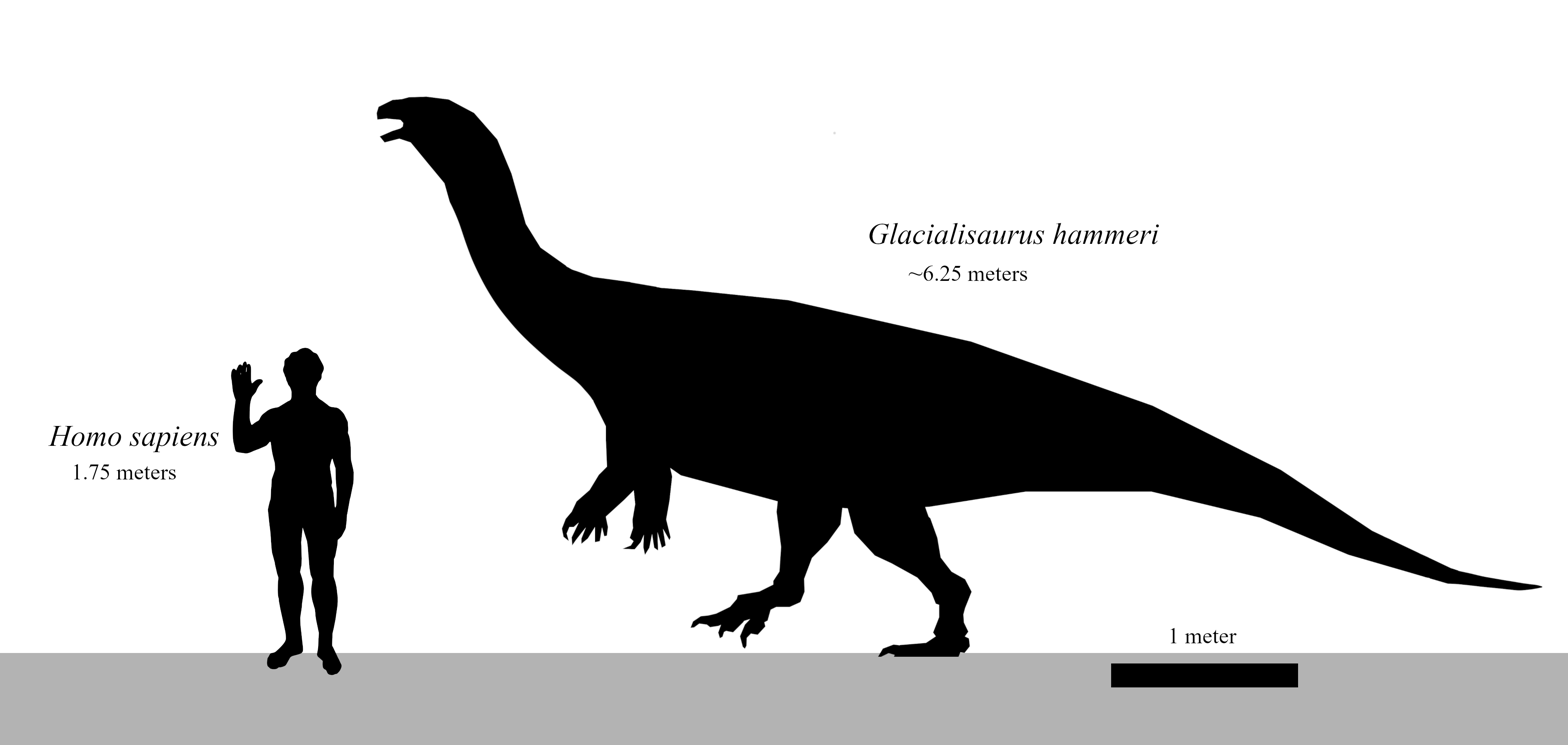
Diagram depicting the size of Glacialisaurus based on FMNH PR 1822

While few remains are known of Glacialisaurus, its leg bones show it was a robust basal (early diverging or "primitive") sauropodomorph. The femur fragment is the larger of the two known specimens, measuring 300 mm (0.98 ft) as preserved, with an estimated total length when intact of 600 mm (2.0 ft). Glacialisaurus is estimated to have been about 6.2 m (20 ft) long. As a basal sauropodomorph, Glacialisaurus would have had a long neck and a proportionally small head with leaf-shaped teeth. The hand would have been short, wide, and robust with a large claw on the thumb.

=== Leg bones ===
The cross-section of the robust femoral shaft (the long, cylindrical part of the bone) is slightly wider from side to side than from front to back, though not as extreme as in eusauropods. The medial epicondylar crest extends from the right side of the lower part of the femoral shaft and is distinct from all other sauropodomorphs in that it is robust, a trait convergently evolved in basal theropods. The front surface of the femur is flat instead of convex from side to side, a feature shared with other basal sauropodomorphs. The top surface of the upper femur lacks any anterior extensor groove. At the lower end, the lateral and medial condyles are separated by a craniocaudal groove (a deep trench running from the front to the back of the bottom of the femur) that ends abruptly with a popliteal fossa (opening in the bone). Glacialisaurus is distinguished by its robust adductor ridge (a point of muscle attachment on the lower right side of the femur) extending from the upper end of the femoral medial condyle. This ridge starts at the end of the medial condyle and is kidney-shaped with a long axis spanning from the front left to the back right side of the condyle..

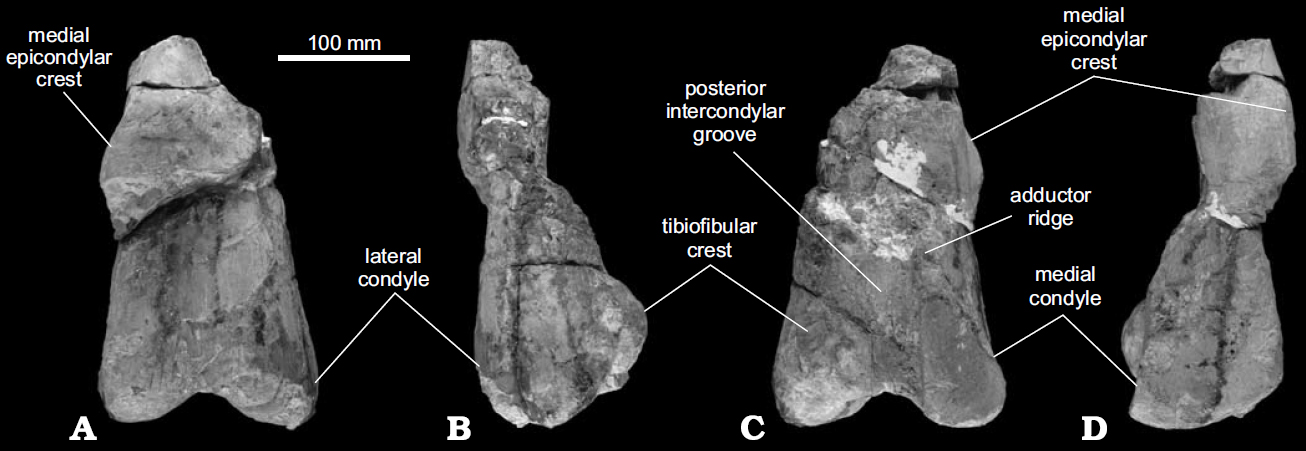
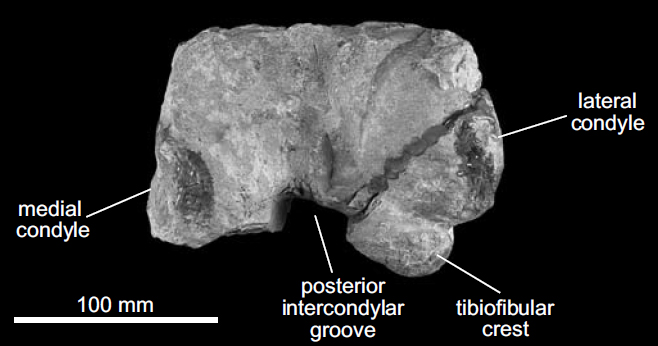
Partial femur (FMNHPR 1822) in multiple views

The astragalus is low and elongate from across side to side and the medial portion lacks the craniocaudally broadening compared to the lateral portion, a trait found in most non-eusauropods. The astragalus is weakly convex at the lower end, though this is not as extreme as in Blikanasaurus and Lessemsaurus. The upper surface of the astragalus is softly convex because it is where the lower end of the tibia (shin bone) articulates with the astragalus. This surface is pierced by two foramina (small openings in bone) that have been interpreted as vascular foramina. The ascending process (protrusion of bone) is mound shaped and its upper articular surface faces proximomedially. The distal tarsals have a laterally elongated triangular shape in when seen from their top ends. The corners of the tarsals are rounded and bulbous, especially in the posteromedial corner. The medial distal tarsal is not confined solely to metatarsal III, but also barely contacts the proximal end of metatarsal II, like in Saturnalia. The lateral distal tarsal has a quadrangular shape and was likely longer mediolaterally than proximodistally.

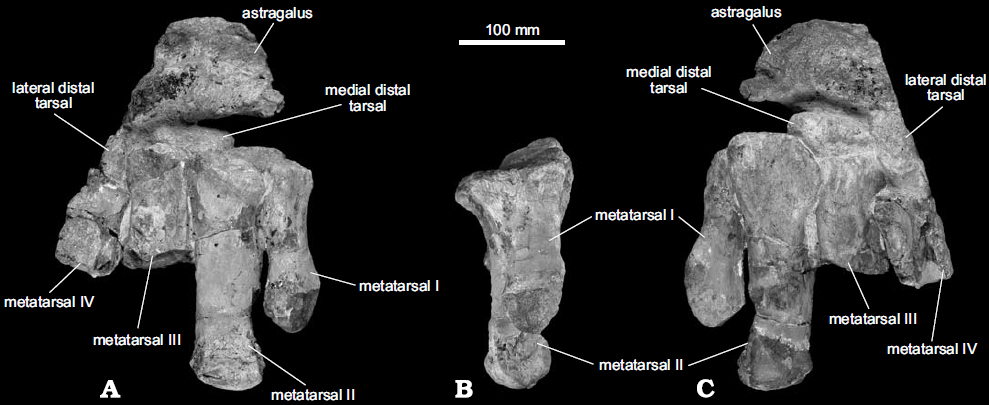
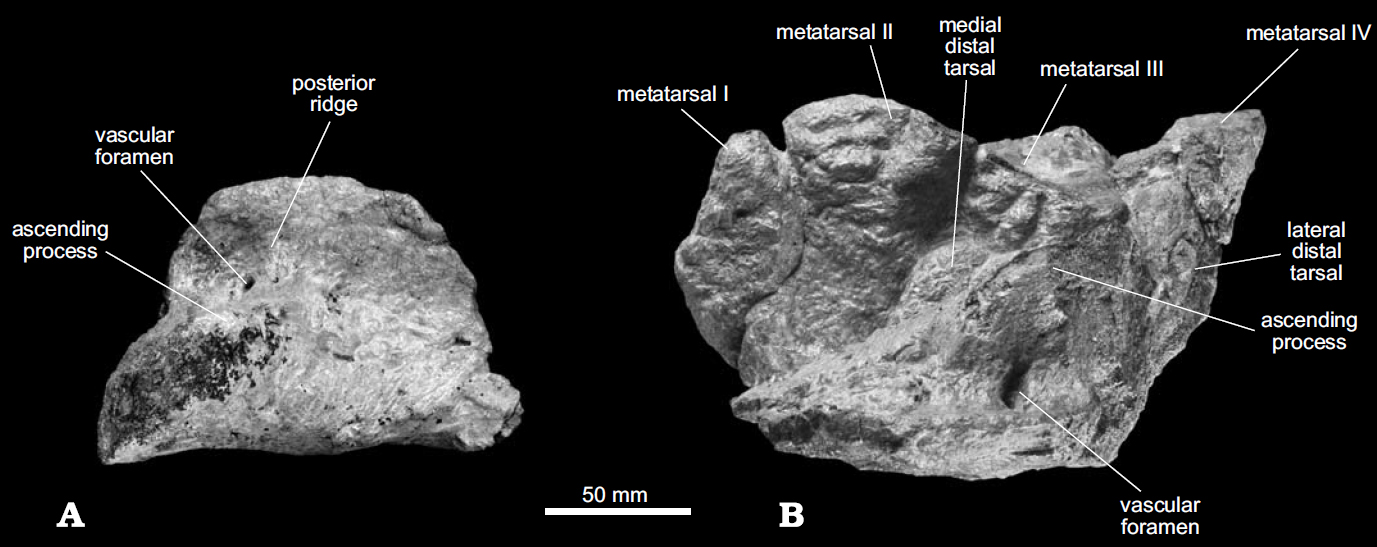
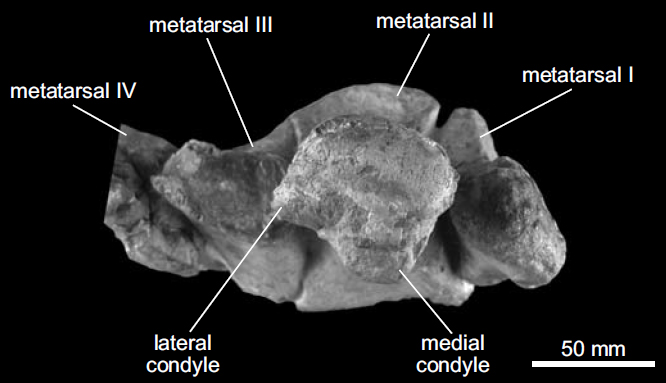
Foot bones of the holotype (FMNH PR1823) in multiple views, including the astragalus bone, metatarsals, and tarsals

Metatarsal I is roughly 3/4 the length of metatarsal II, as in most basal sauropodomorphs. Metatarsal I has a broad and short shaft that is ellipse shaped, more so than in most other basal sauropodomorphs. The upper portion of the small posterior groove separating the two distal condyles is similar to that of Plateosaurus. The medial condyle is less robust and more proximally positioned than the lateral one. This would cause a medial displacement of the first digit, a characteristic in most saurischian dinosaurs (the group that includes sauropodomorphs and theropods). The upper end of metatarsal II is hourglass-shaped and has concave medial-lateral ends to articulate with the other metatarsals. The medial concavity is well developed, but the lateral concavity is less so.

The diagnostic traits (characteristics that distinguish a taxon from others) of the second metatarsals include: a front border that is weakly convex in proximal aspect; a hypertrophied lateral plantar flange on the proximal end (present, but less developed in many basal sauropodomorphs, e.g., Saturnalia, Plateosaurus); and a medial distal condyle that is more robust and well−developed than the lateral distal condyle. The third metatarsal lacks much preserved detail, but has a trapezoidal upper end with a straight to concave front border and a slightly convex medial border for articulation with metatarsal II. The hind edge is narrower from side toside than the front one, but is not acute or rounded, causing the upper outline of metatarsal III to be almost trapezoidal, as in Lufengosaurus, Gyposaurus, and Coloradisaurus. On the contrary, most non-eusauropod sauropodomorphs have almost triangular upper outlines. Only the upper portion of the metatarsal IV is preserved, but preserves an upper outline akin to that of Lufengosaurus that has a broad anterior face and a finger−like posteromedial projection. This finger-like process is slightly convex and would have articulated with metatarsal III.

== Classification ==
The phylogenetic position of Glacialisaurus is unstable due to its fragmentary nature, but it is frequently found to be a member of the family Massospondylidae. Massospondylids are a group of non-eusauropod sauropodomorphs that existed during the Late Triassic to Early Jurassic in Africa, Antarctica, Asia, and the Americas. Massospondylids have been recovered as the sister group (most closely related group) to more derived sauropodomorphs, including Sauropoda itself, and are more derived than groups like Plateosauridae. In their 2007 phylogenetic analysis of the relationships of Glacialisaurus, Smith and Pol found that it was a massospondylid. Features of its foot are similar to Lufengosaurus (from the Early Jurassic of China), and the phylogenetic study suggested that these dinosaurs were close relatives, whereas Massospondylus was found to be a more basal form. This has been supported by later analyses, including Müller (2019) which found it in a clade with Coloradisaurus and Lufengosaurus, while Massospondylus, Sarahsaurus, Pradhania, and Xingxiulong were more basal in the family.

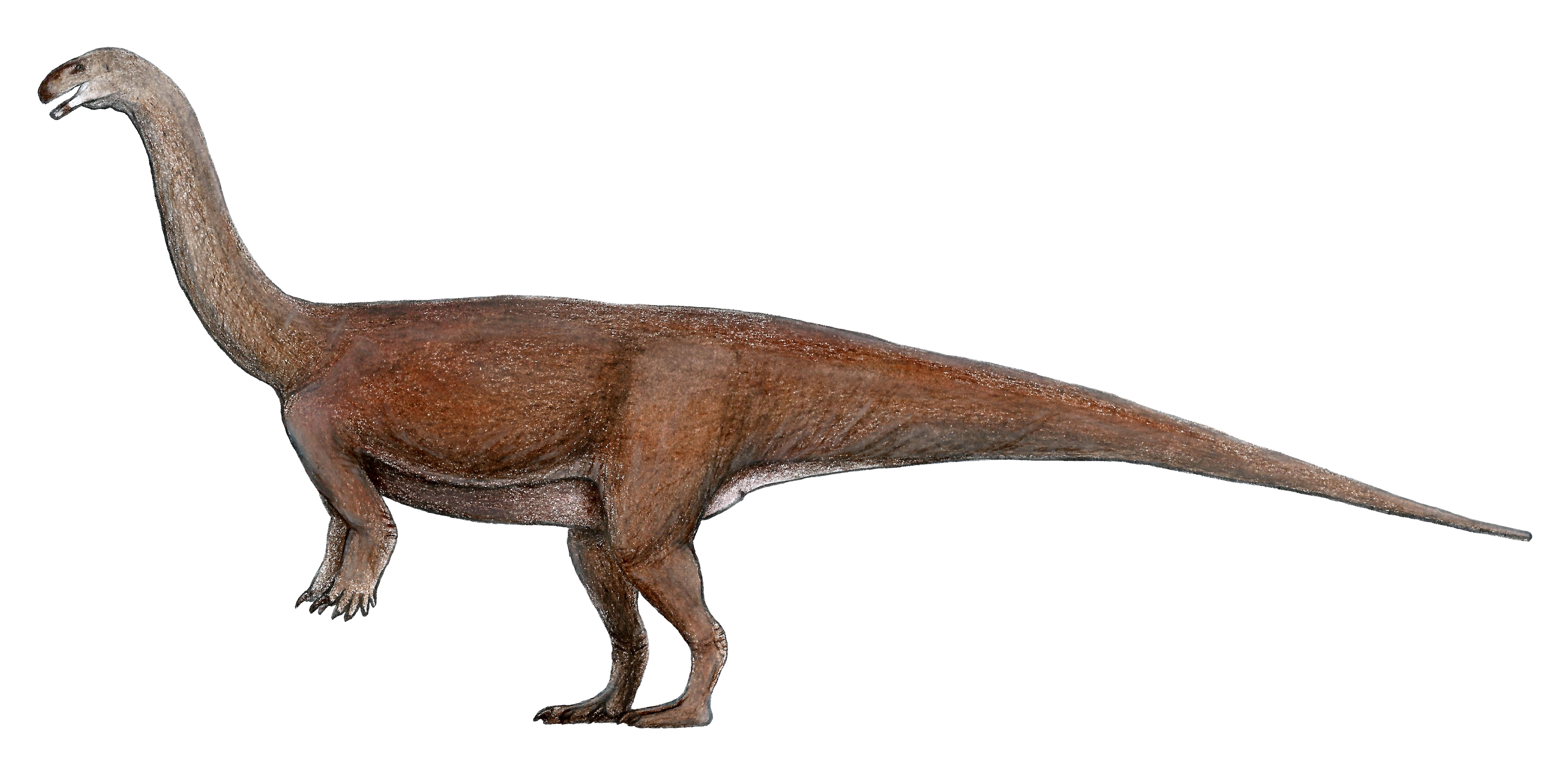
Hypothetical life restoration based on related animals

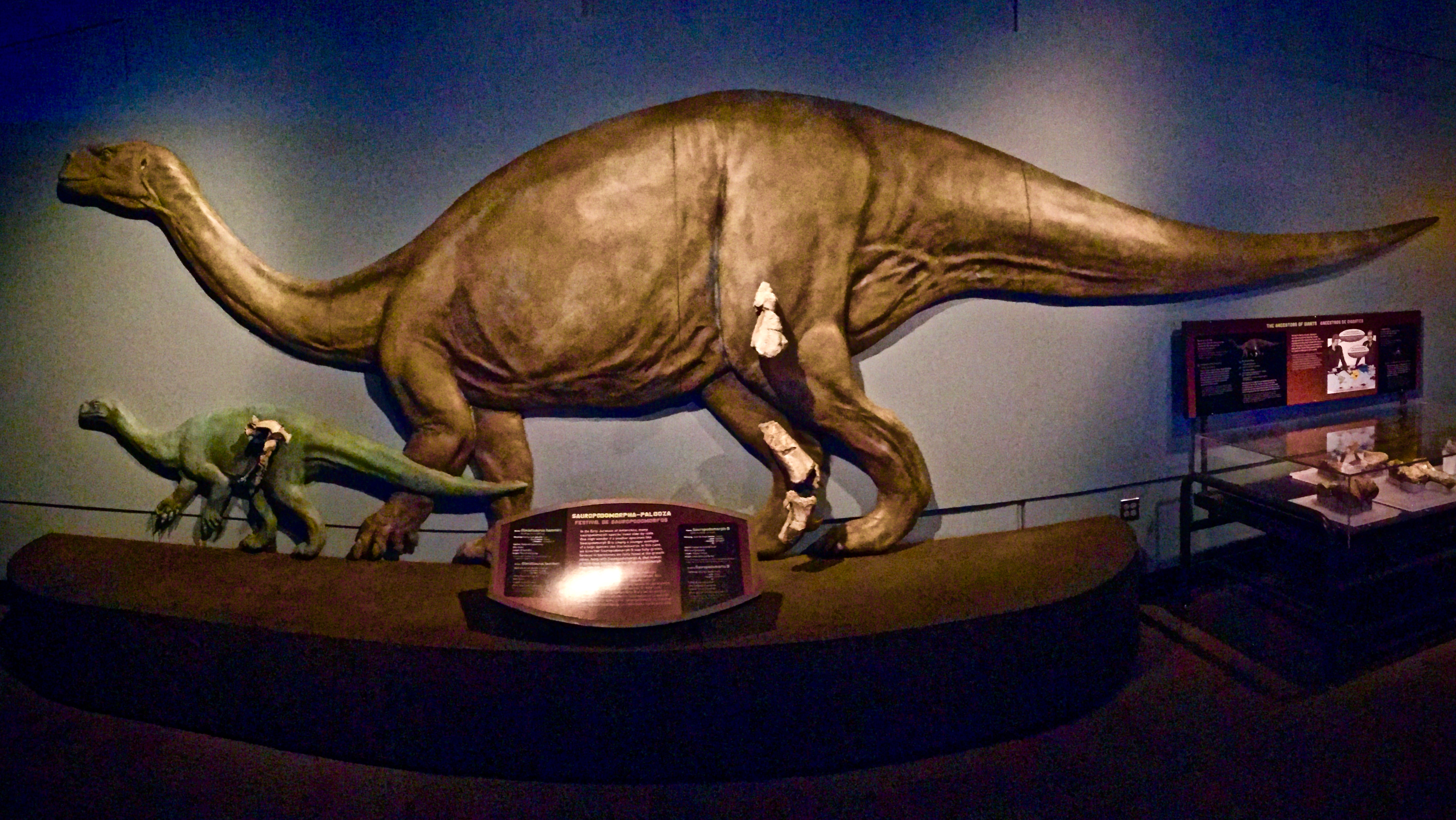
Model in the Field Museum with bones shown in place (smaller model is an unnamed sauropodomorph also from Antarctica)

The paleontologist Oliver W. M. Rauhut and colleagues found Lufengosaurus to be most closely related to Glacialisaurus in 2020, and the following cladogram shows the placement they recovered for Glacialisaurus within the sauropodomorph group Massopoda:

- Massopoda
  - - Eucnemesaurus
    - Riojasaurus
  - - Sarahsaurus
    - - Massospondylidae
        - - Yunnanosaurus
          - - Jingshanosaurus
            - Seitaad
        - - - Coloradisaurus
            - - Glacialisaurus
              - Lufengosaurus
          - - Massospondylus
            - - Adeopapposaurus
              - Leyesaurus
      - Sauropodiformes

The discovery of Glacialisaurus is important to the study of the early distribution of sauropod dinosaurs. The presence of this primitive sauropodomorph in the Hanson Formation (which has also yielded remains attributed to true sauropods) shows that both primitive and advanced members of this lineage existed side by side in the early Jurassic Period.

== Paleoenvironment ==
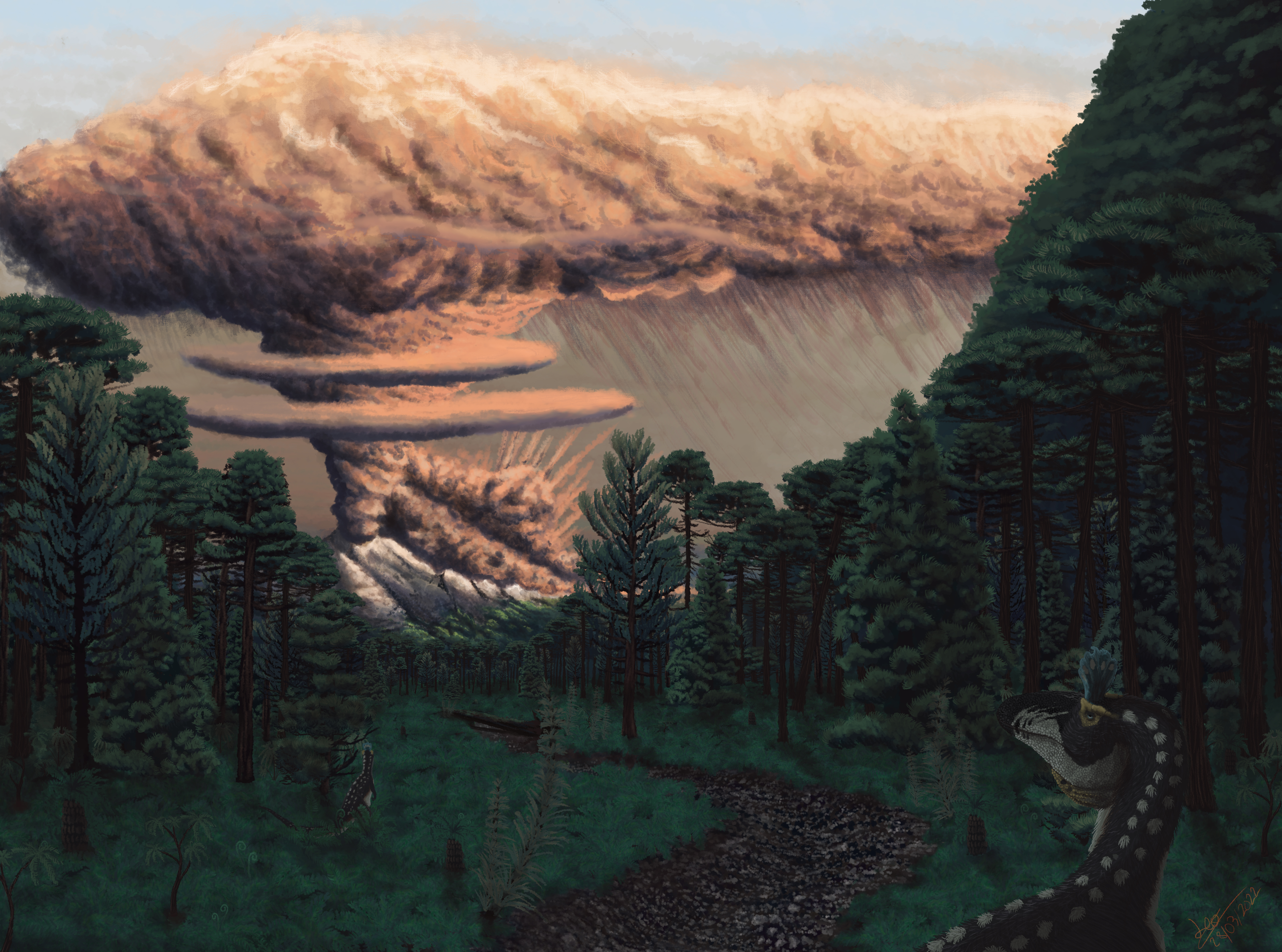
Some sediments in the Hanson Formation are of volcanic origin, suggesting Plinian eruptions during the deposition

Glacialisaurus is known from the Hanson Formation, which is one of only two major dinosaur-bearing rock formations found on Antarctica. The specimens were discovered in tuffaceous siltstone deposited in the Sinemurian to Pliensbachian stage of the Early Jurassic, dating to about 194–188 million years ago. This geological formation is part of the Victoria Group of the Transantarctic Mountains, which is approximately 4,000 m (13,000 ft) above sea level. The high altitude of this site supports the idea that early Jurassic Antarctica had forests populated by a diverse range of species, at least along the coast. The Hanson Formation was deposited in an active volcano−tectonic rift system formed during the breakup of the supercontinent Gondwana. Local volcanism and evidence of wildfires is known from some paleobotanical sites in the Hanson Formation.

Models of Jurassic air flow indicate that coastal areas probably never dropped much below freezing, although more extreme conditions existed inland. Glacialisaurus was found about 650 kilometres (400 mi) from the South Pole, which was about 1,000 km (621 mi) or so farther north at the time. This formation has yielded the remains of the large theropod Cryolophosaurus, a crow-sized dimorphodontid pterosaur, a rat-sized tritylodont synapsid, and two small unnamed sauropodomorphs. Many plant genera have also been recovered from the Shafer Peak section of the Hanson Formation that suggest forests similar to the open woodlands of North Island, New Zealand. Known plants include Cheirolepidiaceaen conifers, Equisetites horsetails, and Cladophlebis ferns that have also been found or are similar to plants found in other Early Jurassic sites that represent warm climates. Basal sauropodomorphs like Glacialisaurus were the first very large dinosaurs and, due to their height, the first herbivores to high browse.

== See also ==
- List of Australian and Antarctic dinosaurs
- South Polar region of the Cretaceous
