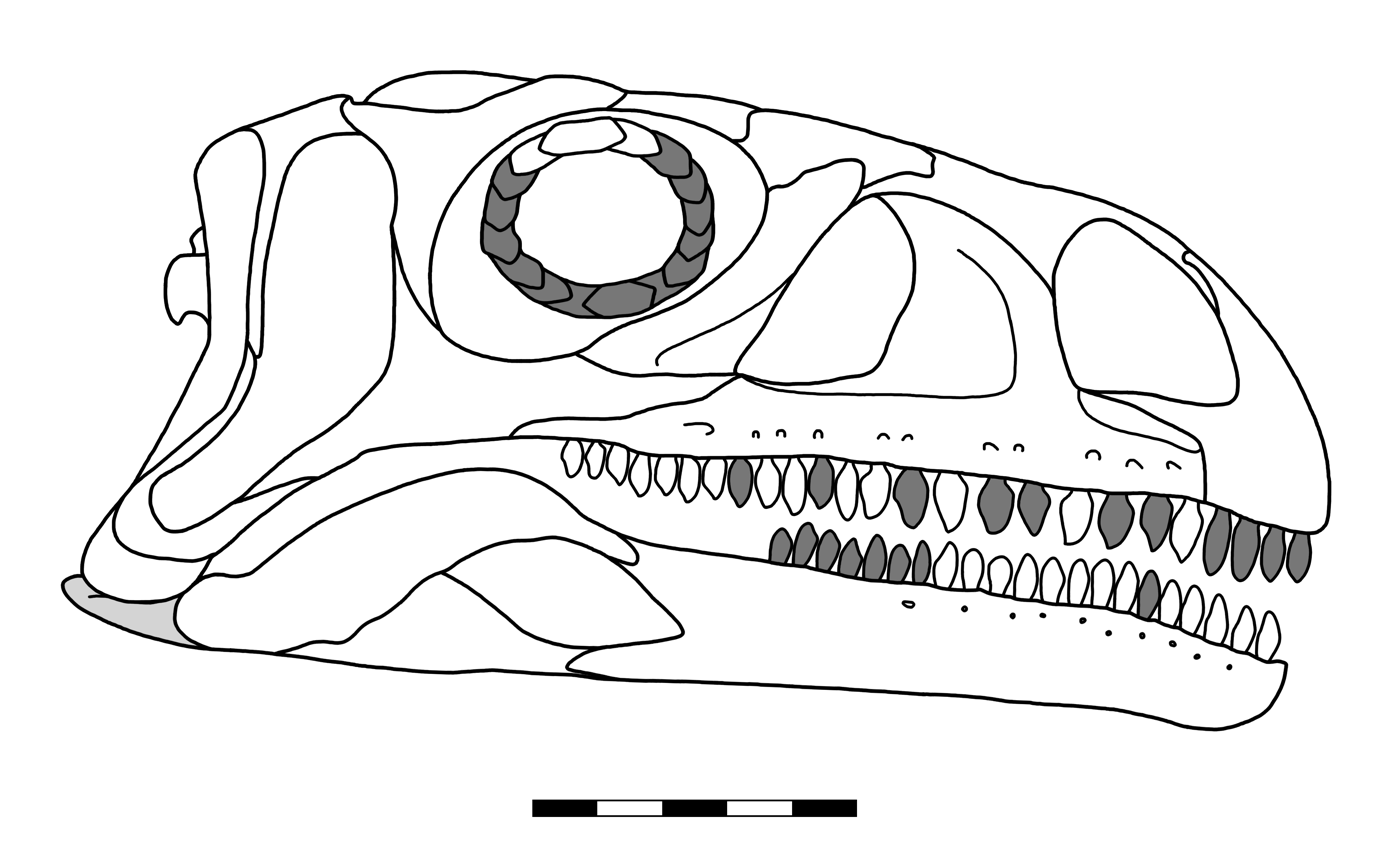
- Diagram showing known skull elements; shaded parts represent missing bones

Scientific classification
- Kingdom: Animalia
- Phylum: Chordata
- Class: Reptilia
- Clade: Dinosauria
- Clade: Saurischia
- Clade: †Sauropodomorpha
- Family: †Massospondylidae
- Genus: †Coloradisaurus; Galton, 1990

Type species
- †Coloradisaurus brevis (Bonaparte, 1979)

Synonyms
- Coloradia brevis Bonaparte, 1979 (preoccupied by Coloradia Blake, 1863); "Coloradisaurus" Lambert, 1983 (nomen nudum)

= Coloradisaurus =

Coloradisaurus Temporal range: Norian ~213 Ma

Extinct genus of dinosaurs

Coloradisaurus (meaning "Los Colorados lizard") is a genus of massospondylid sauropodomorph dinosaur. It lived during the Late Triassic period (Norian stage) in what is now La Rioja Province, Argentina. It is known from two specimens collected from the Los Colorados Formation of the Ischigualasto-Villa Unión Basin.

== Taxonomy ==
Coloradisaurus brevis was originally named Coloradia brevis by José Bonaparte in 1979, but that genus name was preoccupied by the pine moth Coloradia, so it needed a replacement name. In 1983, David Lambert used the name Coloradisaurus for the genus, but did not indicate it was a replacement or diagnose it. Lambert had gotten the name from Bonaparte in a personal communication and mistakenly thought that Bonaparte had already published it. Peter Galton was the next to use the name Coloradisaurus in 1990, which he credited to Lambert, when he gave the taxon a diagnosis in his review of prosauropods in The Dinosauria. Authorship of Coloradisaurus has traditionally been attributed to Lambert, but Greenfield, Bivens and Fonseca (2020) judged Lambert's use of the name to be a nomen nudum. They concluded that authorship should be attributed to Galton, who was the first to use the name Coloradisaurus in a way that met the requirements of the ICZN.

== Description ==
The holotype of Coloradisaurus (PVL 3967) is a mostly complete skull found associated with an undescribed partial skeleton. While the right side of the skull is well-preserved with almost all bones intact, the left side is distorted and missing more bones. The holotype individual has been estimated to have been 3 m (10 ft) long with a mass of 70 kg (150 lb). A referred specimen (PVL 5904) is a partial skeleton including most of the dorsal vertebrae and parts of the pectoral and pelvic girdles and limbs. Like Lufengosaurus, it have the angle between the pterygoid and quadratojugal rami nearly 90°. There is also a possibility that the postorbital bones of Coloradisaurus and Sarahsaurus are similar, but due to the deformation of the skull this is difficult to say.

All material of Coloradisaurus was discovered in 1971 at the La Esquina locality in the upper section of the Los Colorados Formation near Pagancillo, La Rioja Province, Argentina. The top of the Los Colorados Formation has been dated to 213 Ma, which would place Coloradisaurus in the Norian stage of the Late Triassic.

== Phylogeny ==
Coloradisaurus was classified as a plateosaurid in the original description by Bonaparte, but this pre-dated the use of phylogenetic analyses in paleontology. He later became opposed to cladistics and continued to consider Coloradisaurus a plateosaurid without testing its phylogenetic position. The analyses of Galton (1990), Galton & Upchurch (2004), and Upchurch et al. (2007) found it to be a plateosaurid, supporting Bonaparte's placement. However, the analyses of Benton et al. (2000) and Yates (2003) recovered it in a polytomy with other basal sauropodomorphs or as a massospondylid, respectively. Subsequent analyses such as Yates et al. (2010), Apaldetti et al. (2013; 2014), Wang et al. (2017), and Müller (2020) have reached the consensus that Coloradisaurus is a massospondylid most closely related to Lufengosaurus and Glacialisaurus. These three taxa share four synapomorphies found in the metatarsals and femur.

Below is a simplified cladogram after Galton & Upchurch (2004), reflecting its early placement as a plateosaurid.

- Sauropodomorpha
  - Sauropoda
  - Prosauropoda
    - - Thecodontosaurus
    - - - Saturnalia
        - - Anchisauria
            - Anchisauridae
            - Melanorosauridae
          - Plateosauria
            - Jingshanosaurus
            - - Yunnanosaurus
              - - Massospondylus
                - Plateosauridae
                  - Mussaurus
                  - - Coloradisaurus
                    - - - "Gyposaurus" sinensis
                        - Lufengosaurus
                      - - Euskelosaurus
                        - - Plateosaurus
                          - Sellosaurus

Below is a simplified cladogram after Müller (2020), showing its current position as a massospondylid.

- Plateosauria
  - Plateosauridae
  - Massopoda
    - Unaysauridae
    - Anchisauria
      - Anchisaurus
      - - - Adeopapposaurus
          - Leyesaurus
        - - Massospondylidae
            - - Sarahsaurus
              - Xingxiulong
            - - - Pradhania
                - "Massospondylus" kaalae
              - - Massospondylus
                - - Lufengosaurus
                  - Glacialisaurus
                  - Coloradisaurus
          - Sauropodiformes
