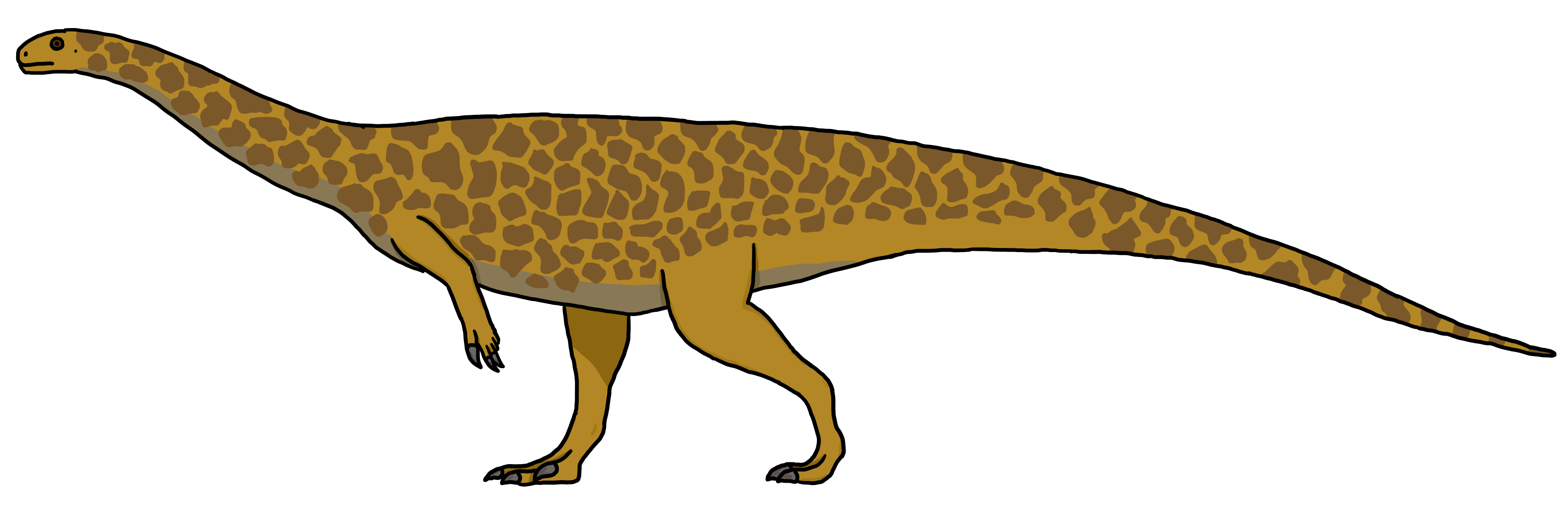
- Restoration

Scientific classification
- Domain: Eukaryota
- Kingdom: Animalia
- Phylum: Chordata
- Clade: Dinosauria
- Clade: Saurischia
- Clade: †Sauropodomorpha
- Family: †Massospondylidae
- Genus: †Pradhania; Kutty et al. 2007

Species
- †P. gracilis Kutty et al. 2007 (type)

= Pradhania =

Pradhania Temporal range: Early Jurassic, Sinemurian

Extinct genus of dinosaurs

Pradhania (named after Dhuiya Pradhan, a fossil collector at the Indian Statistical Institute) is a genus of massospondylid sauropodomorph dinosaur from the Sinemurian-age (Early Jurassic) Upper Dharmaram Formation of India. It was first named by T. S. Kutty, Sankar Chatterjee, Peter M. Galton and Paul Upchurch in 2007 and the type species is Pradhania gracilis. It was a sauropodomorph of modest size, only about four meters (13 ft) long, and is known from fragmentary remains. It was originally regarded as a basal sauropodomorph but new cladistic analysis performed by Novas et al., 2011 suggests that Pradhania is a massospondylid. Pradhania presents two synapomorphies of Massospondylidae recovered in their phylogenetic analysis.
