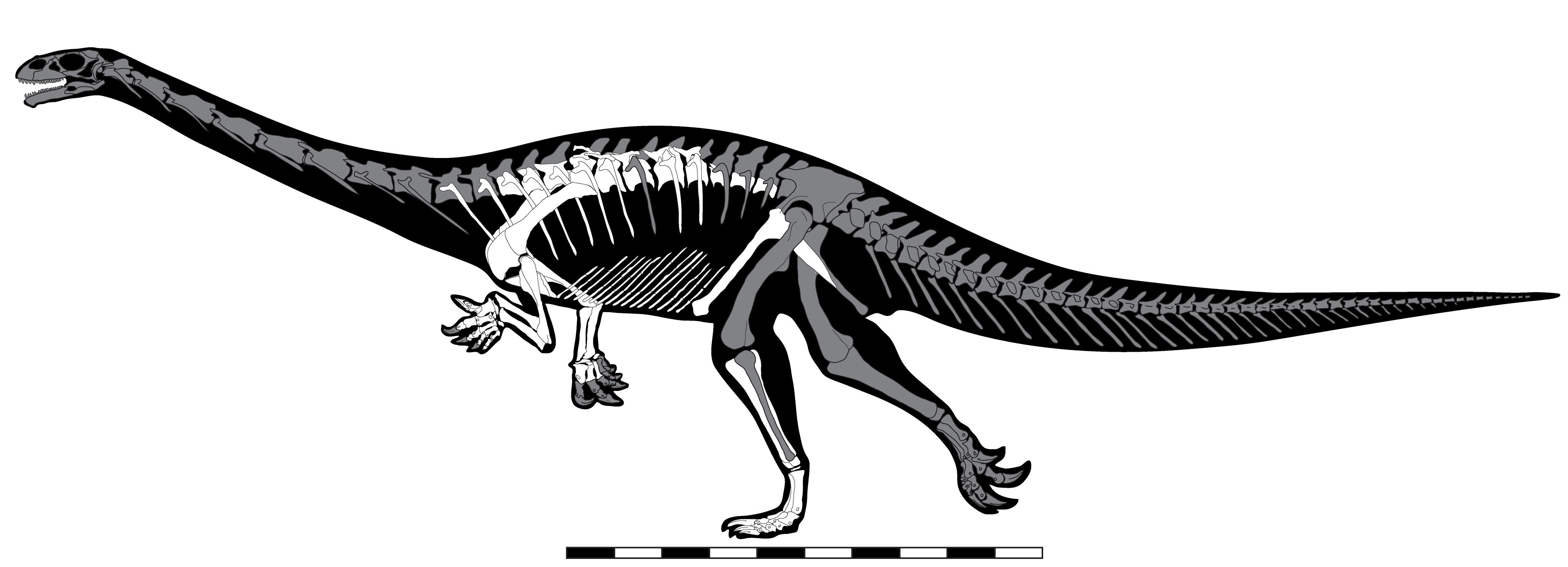
- Skeletal reconstruction

Scientific classification
- Kingdom: Animalia
- Phylum: Chordata
- Class: Reptilia
- Clade: Dinosauria
- Clade: Saurischia
- Clade: †Sauropodomorpha
- Clade: †Sauropodiformes
- Genus: †Seitaad; Sertich & Loewen, 2010
- Species: †S. ruessi

Binomial name
- †Seitaad ruessi Sertich & Loewen, 2010

= Seitaad =

Seitaad Temporal range: Early Jurassic, Pliensbachian

Extinct genus of dinosaurs

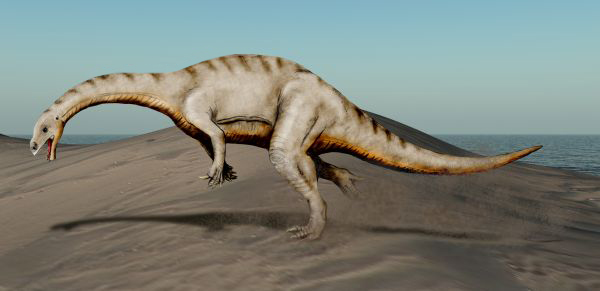
Restoration

Seitaad is a genus of sauropodomorph dinosaur which lived during the Early Jurassic period in what is now southern Utah, United States.

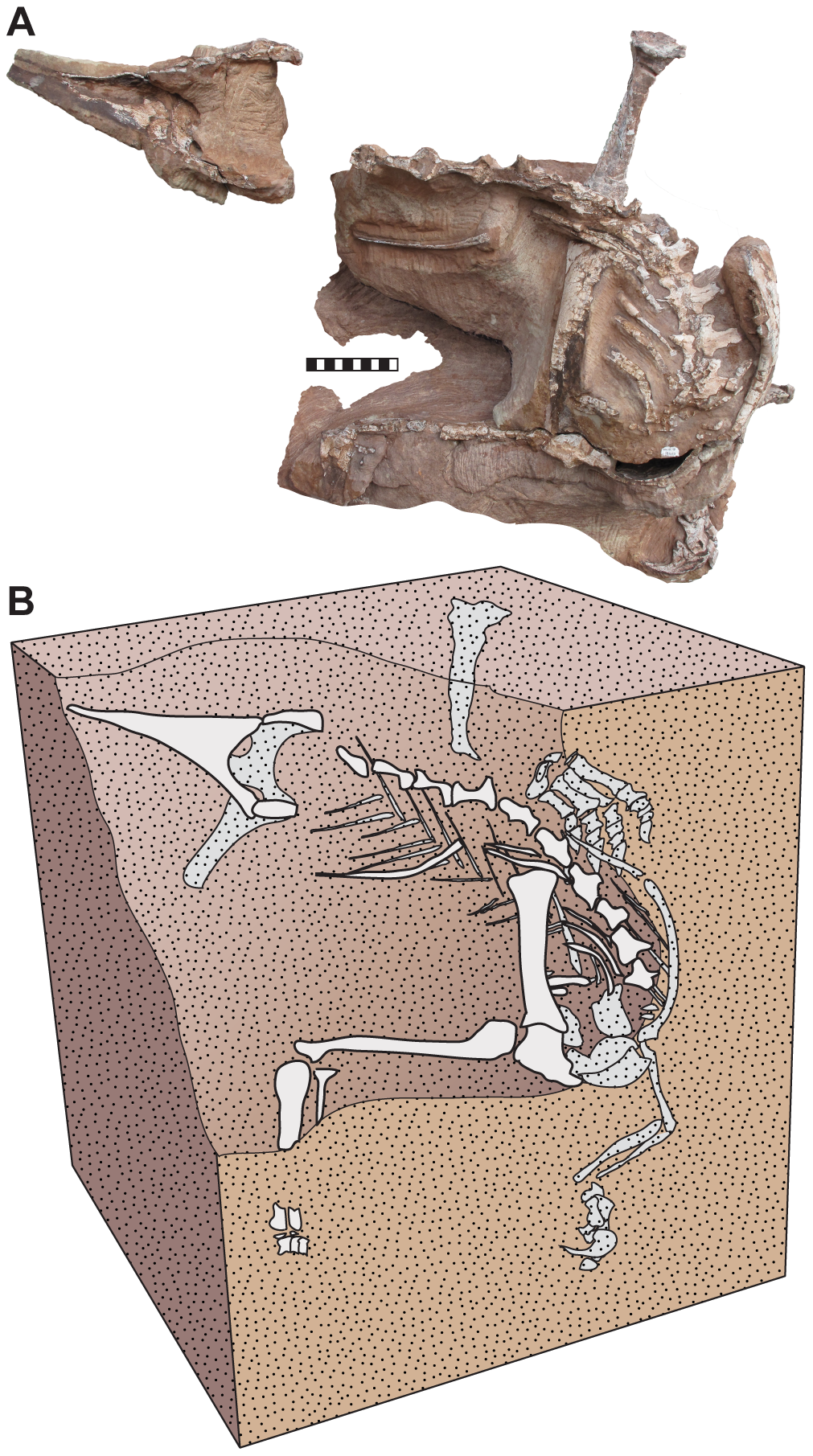
Fossils in the position they were found

Seitaad is known from an articulated partial postcranial holotype skeleton referred to as UMNH VP 18040. The skeleton is missing its head, neck and tail. It was collected from the Lower Jurassic Navajo Sandstone, the uppermost unit of the Glen Canyon Group, dating to the Pliensbachian stage, near Comb Ridge, San Juan County. A phylogenetic study of Seitaad found it to be a plateosaur sauropodomorph, placing it in Massospondylidae or alternatively (a less probable position) in Plateosauridae, but its placement within the Plateosauria is not well understood. In a cladistic analysis, presented by Apaldetti and colleagues in November 2011, Seitaad was found to be within Massopoda, just outside Anchisauria.

Seitaad was first described by Joseph J. W. Sertich and Mark A. Loewen in 2010 and the type species is Seitaad ruessi. The generic name is derived from Séít'áád (Navajo language), a mythological sand monster from the Diné folklore who buried its victims in dunes. Seitaad appears to have been entombed by the collapse of a sand dune. The specific name honours Everett Ruess, a young artist, poet and naturalist, who mysteriously disappeared in 1934 while exploring southern Utah. Seitaad is the second basal sauropodomorph dinosaur to have been identified in North America.
