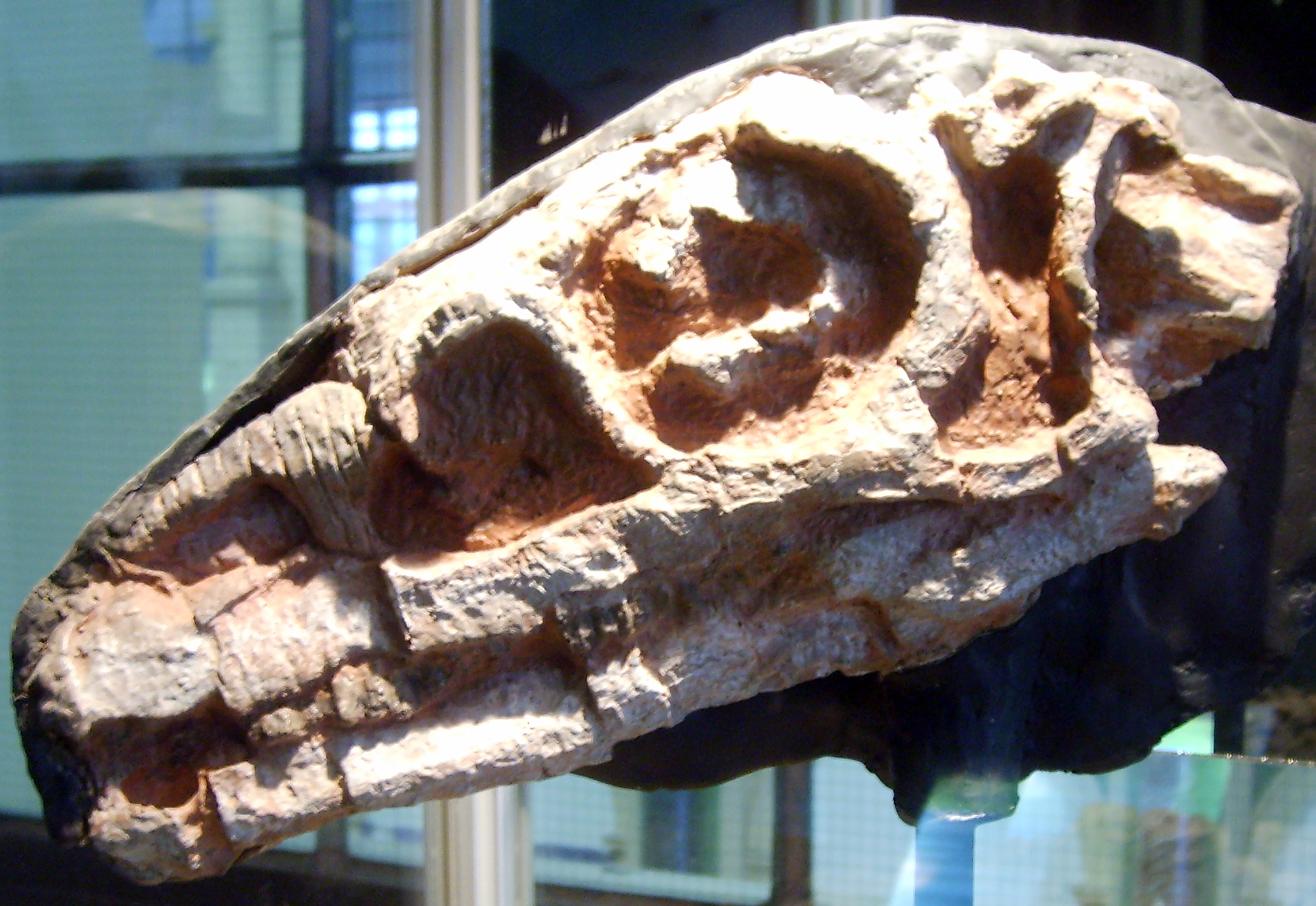
- Riojasaurus skull cast

Scientific classification
- Kingdom: Animalia
- Phylum: Chordata
- Class: Reptilia
- Clade: Dinosauria
- Clade: Saurischia
- Clade: †Sauropodomorpha
- Clade: †Riojasauridae
- Genus: †Riojasaurus; Bonaparte 1969

Type species
- †Riojasaurus incertus Bonaparte 1969

= Riojasaurus =

Riojasaurus Temporal range: Late Triassic (Norian) ~225–213 Ma

Extinct genus of dinosaurs

Riojasaurus (meaning "lizard from La Rioja") was a herbivorous sauropodomorph dinosaur named after La Rioja Province in Argentina where it was found in the Los Colorados Formation in the Ischigualasto-Villa Unión Basin by José Bonaparte. It lived during the Late Triassic (Norian stage) and grew to about 6.6 metres (22 ft) long. Riojasaurus is the only known riojasaurid to live in South America.

== Discovery and naming ==
Riojasaurus incertus was named by Bonaparte (1969) and was based on the holotype specimen, PVL 3808, which was discovered in 1966 and consists of a postcranial skeleton which lacks the skull and mandibles, but preserves 6 presacral vertebrae, diverse caudals, both scapulae, the ischia, and the bones of the hand. In total, at least twenty specimens have been assigned to R. incertus, and the first cranial material of R. incertus was discovered in 1987 and described in 1995.

In 1994, 56 caudal vertebrae from one specimen, and a cast of the skull of Riojasaurus incertus, along with several other specimens, were stolen from the National University of La Rioja in Argentina. As of 2023, the whereabouts of the stolen fossils are unknown.

== Description ==
Size comparison

Riojasaurus had a heavy body, bulky legs, and a long neck and tail. Its leg bones were dense and massive for an early sauropodomorph. In 2010 Gregory S. Paul estimated its length at 6.6 metres (22 ft) and its weight at 800 kilograms (1,800 lb). Large individuals were estimated to have reached 10 metres (33 ft) long and weighed 3 metric tons (3.3 short tons). By contrast, its vertebrae were lightened by hollow cavities, and unlike most early sauropodomorphs, Riojasaurus had four sacral vertebrae instead of three. It has been thought it probably moved slowly on all fours and was unable to rear up on its back legs. The nearly equal length of the fore and hindlimbs has also been interpreted as suggestive of an obligatorily quadrupedal gait, and the relative robustness of the forelimbs and hindlimbs is in the range of quadrupedal animals. However, the morphology of the hand and shoulder girdle has been interpreted as inconsistent with a quadrupedal gait.

No skull was found with the first skeleton of Riojasaurus, although a well-preserved skull attributed to Riojasaurus was found later. The teeth of Riojasaurus were leaf shaped and serrated. The upper jaw contained 5 teeth at the front, with 24 more behind them in a row that ended under the eyes.

Comparisons between the scleral rings of Riojasaurus and modern birds and reptiles suggest that it may have been cathemeral, active throughout the day at short intervals.

== Classification ==
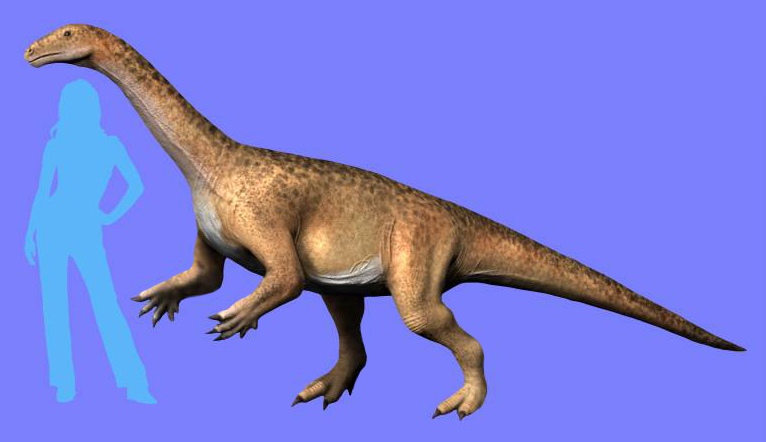
Restoration

Many scientists think that Riojasaurus was closely related to Melanorosaurus, known from the Triassic-Early Jurassic period. However, studies at Bristol University, England, suggest that it is unique in some key ways, such as the longer bones in its neck. It is certainly quite different from other sauropodomorphs found in the Los Colorados Formation of Argentina.

Due to their size and limb anatomy Riojasaurus and the possibly related Melanorosaurus have been considered close relatives of the earliest sauropods.
