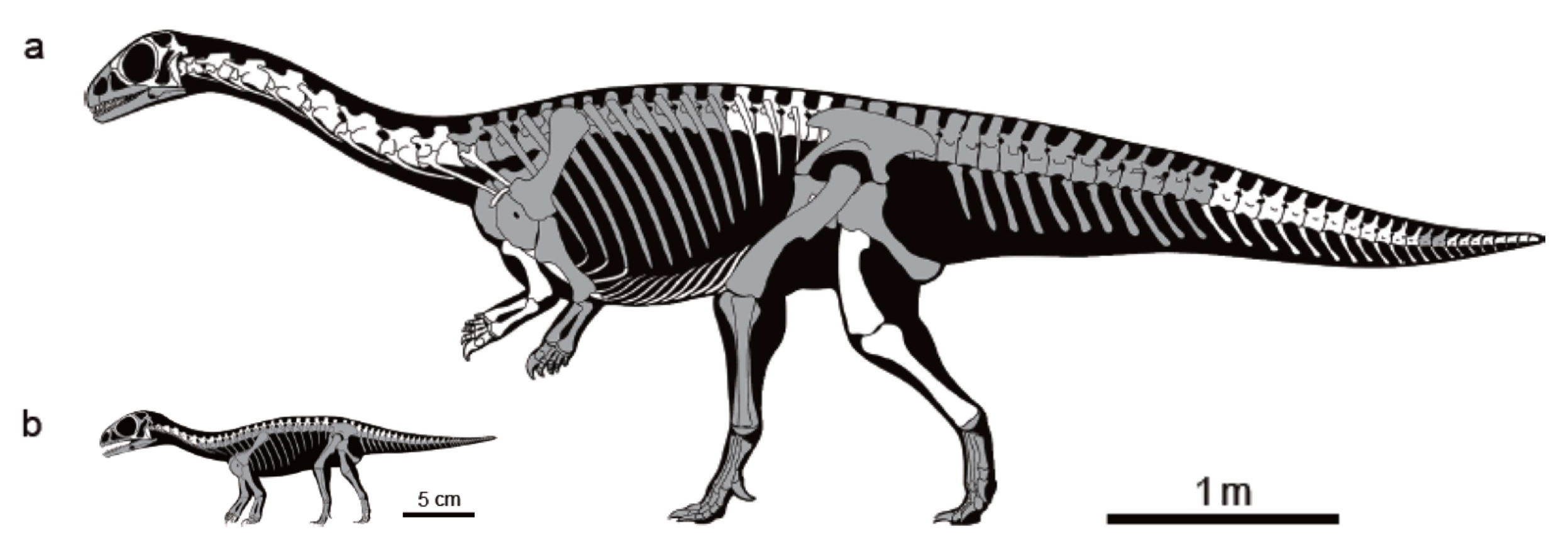
- Reconstructed skeletons of an adult and juvenile (not to scale)

Scientific classification
- Kingdom: Animalia
- Phylum: Chordata
- Class: Reptilia
- Clade: Dinosauria
- Clade: Saurischia
- Clade: †Sauropodomorpha
- Clade: †Massopoda
- Clade: †Sauropodiformes
- Genus: †Qianlong
- Species: †Q. shouhu

Binomial name
- †Qianlong shouhu Han et al., 2023

= Qianlong shouhu =

Qianlong shouhu Temporal range: Early Jurassic, Sinemurian

Extinct species of sauropodomorph dinosaurs

Qianlong shouhu (meaning "Guizhou Province dragon") is an extinct species of basal sauropodomorph dinosaur from the Early Jurassic Ziliujing Formation of China. Qianlong shouhu is the only species in the genus Qianlong, known from partial skeletons of three mature individuals associated with several leathery eggs, some of which contain embryos.

== Discovery and naming ==
The Qianlong fossil material was discovered in sediments of the Ziliujing Formation (Zhenzhuchong Member), dated to the Sinemurian age of the Early Jurassic period near Zhuanpo in Pingba District of Anshun City, Guizhou Province, China. The known material includes the holotype (GZPM VN001), two referred skeletons (GZPM VN002, 003), and five clutches of eggs, some of which contain hatchlings (GZPM VN004–008). The incomplete, partially-articulated holotype specimen includes a partial skull and mandible that were found 30 metres (98 ft) away from the postcrania.

In 2023, Han et al. described Qianlong shouhu as a new genus and species of sauropodiform dinosaur based on these fossil remains. The generic name, "Qianlong", combines the Mandarin word 黔 (Qian, a name for Guizhou Province, China), in reference to the type locality, and long (simplified Chinese: 龙; traditional Chinese: 龍), meaning "dragon". The specific name, "shouhu", is derived from the Mandarin word (simplified Chinese: 守护; traditional Chinese: 守護) for "guarding", in reference to the associated adult and embryos fossils.

== Description ==
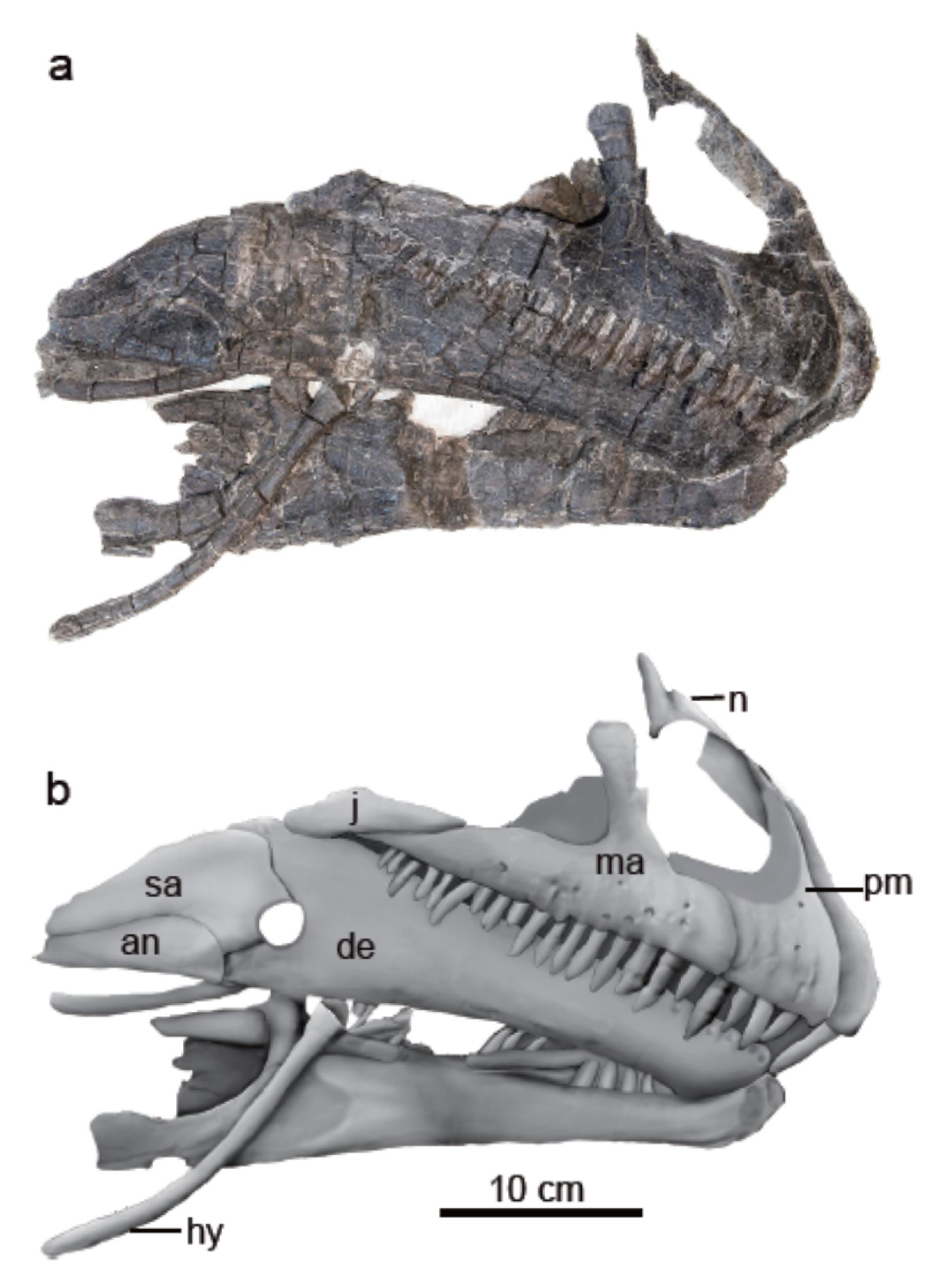
Photograph and illustration of the holotype skull of Qianlong

Due to the closed neurocentral sutures in the vertebrae of the holotype specimen, Han et al. (2023) suggest that the individual was likely an adult when it died. The preserved eggs are elliptical in shape.

=== Ontogeny ===
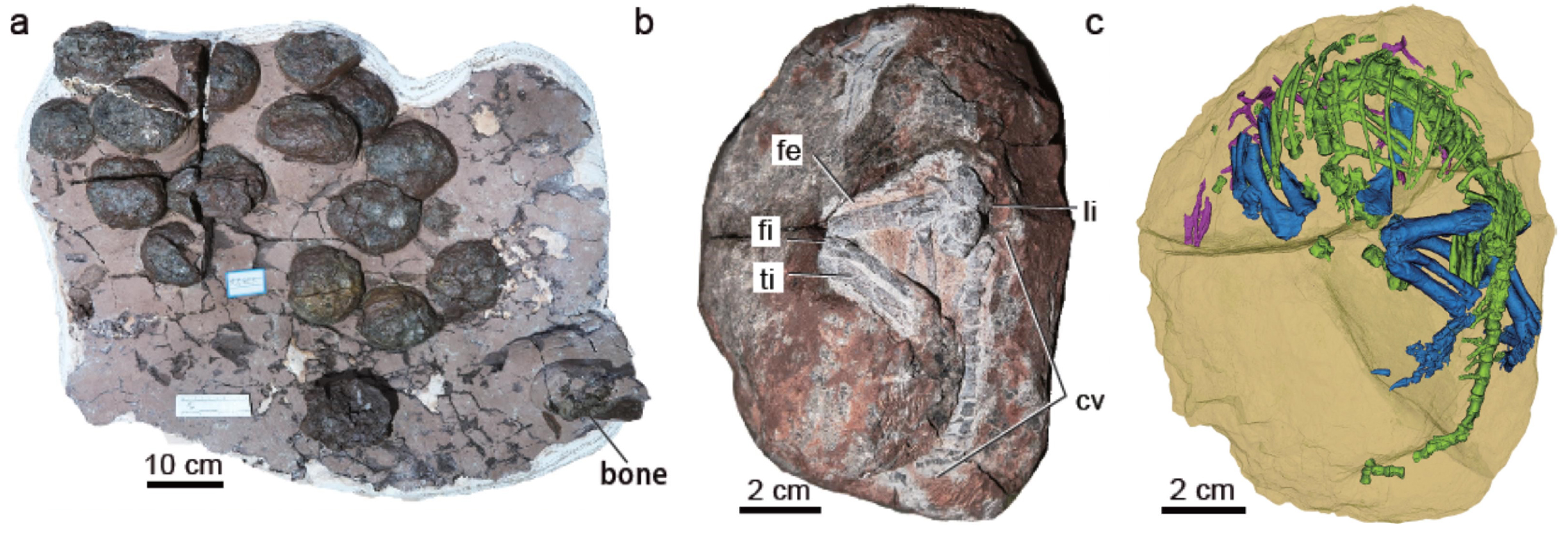
Egg clutch and embryo-bearing egg of Qianlong

In Qianlong juveniles, the skull, mandible, forelimbs, and shoulder girdles are proportionally larger than the adults, similar to the related sauropodomorphs Massospondylus and Mussaurus.

== Classification ==
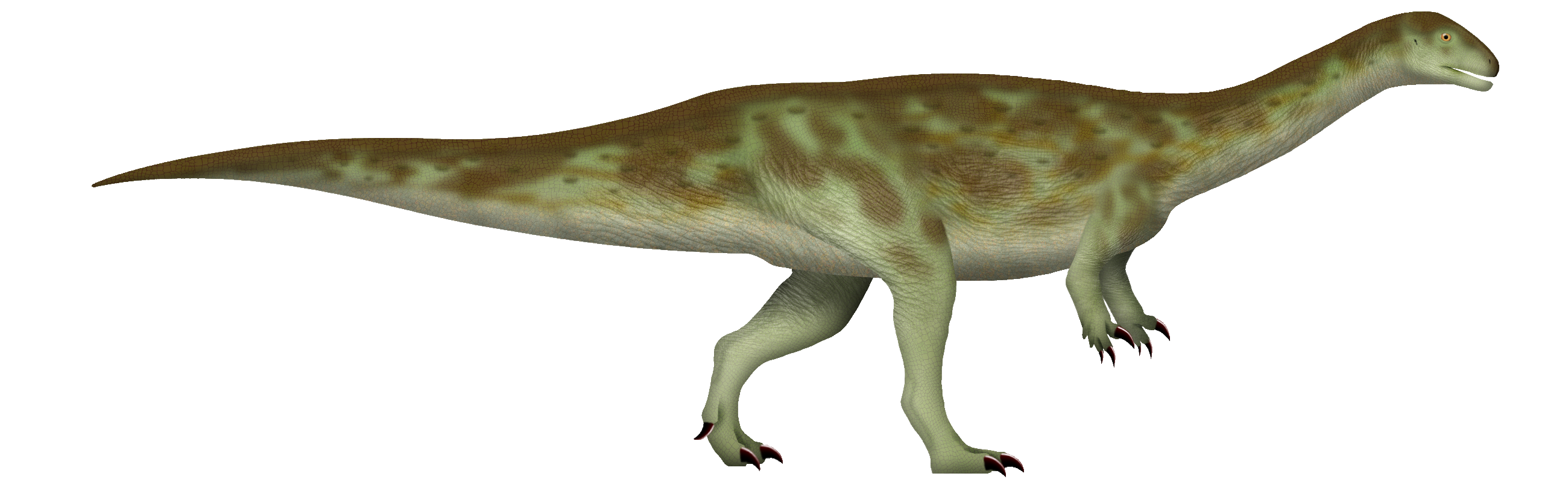
Life restoration of an adult

Yunnanosaurus, a close relative of Qianlong, compared to a human

Qianlong was added to a phylogenetic analysis and found to be at the base of Sauropodiformes, as the sister taxon to Yunnanosaurus.

- Sauropodiformes
  - Xingxiulong
  - - Chuxiongosaurus
    - Jingshanosaurus
  - - Qianlong
    - Yunnanosaurus
  - - Anchisaurus
    - - Aardonyx
      - Sefapanosaurus
      - Mussaurus
      - Yizhousaurus
      - - Melanorosaurus
        - - - Camelotia
            - - - Meroktenos
                - - Kholumolumo
                  - Ledumahadi
              - - Lessemsaurus
                - - Antetonitrus
                  - Ingentia
          - - Gongxianosaurus
            - Pulanesaura
            - - Schleitheimia
              - - Isanosaurus
                - Sauropoda
