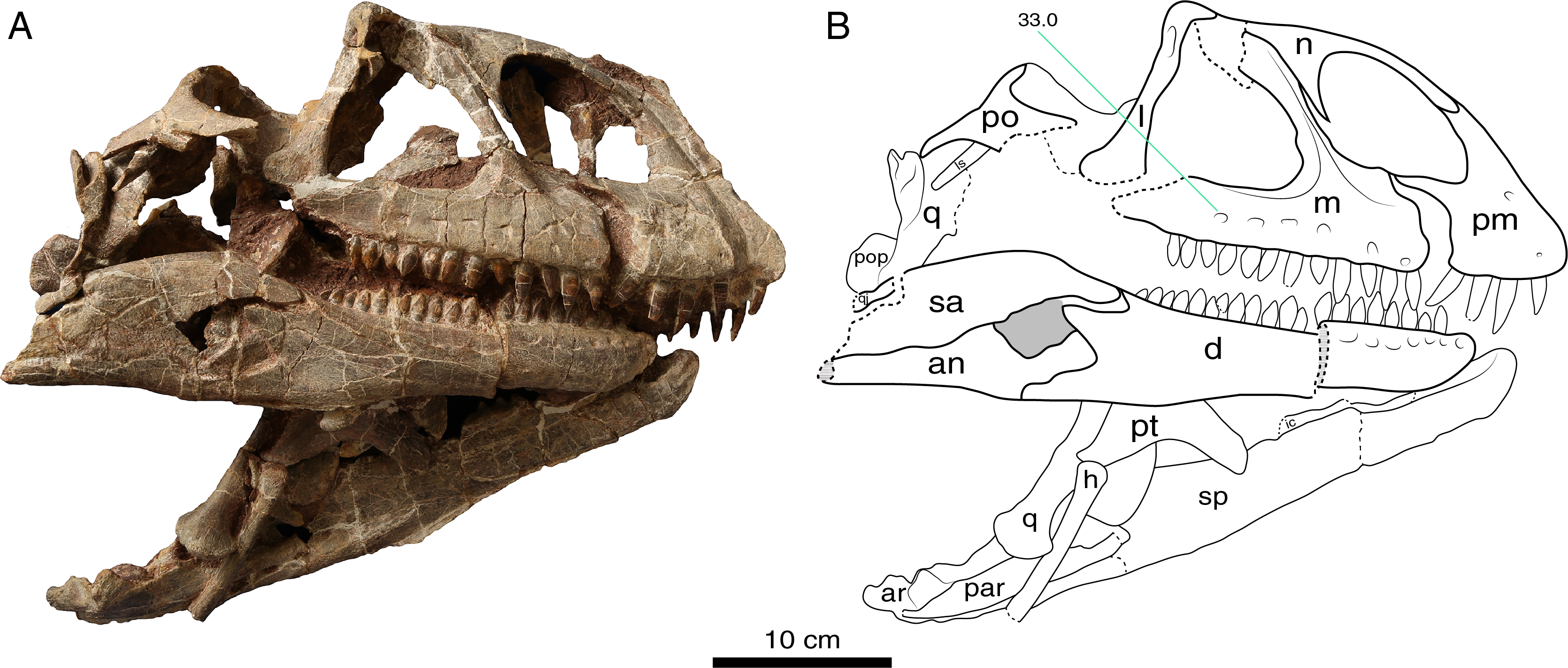
- Holotype skull

Scientific classification
- Kingdom: Animalia
- Phylum: Chordata
- Class: Reptilia
- Clade: Dinosauria
- Clade: Saurischia
- Clade: †Sauropodomorpha
- Clade: †Massopoda
- Clade: †Sauropodiformes
- Genus: †Lishulong
- Species: †L. wangi

Binomial name
- †Lishulong wangi Zhang et al., 2024

= Lishulong =

Lishulong Temporal range: Early Jurassic, late Sinemurian–Toarcian

Genus of sauropodomorph dinosaurs

Lishulong (Traditional Chinese: 栗樹龍 Simplified Chinese : 栗树龙 Pinyin : Lìshùlóng meaning "chestnut tree dragon") is a genus of sauropodiform dinosaur from the Early Jurassic (Sinemurian–Toarcian) Lufeng Formation of China. The type and only species is Lishulong wangi.

== Discovery and naming ==
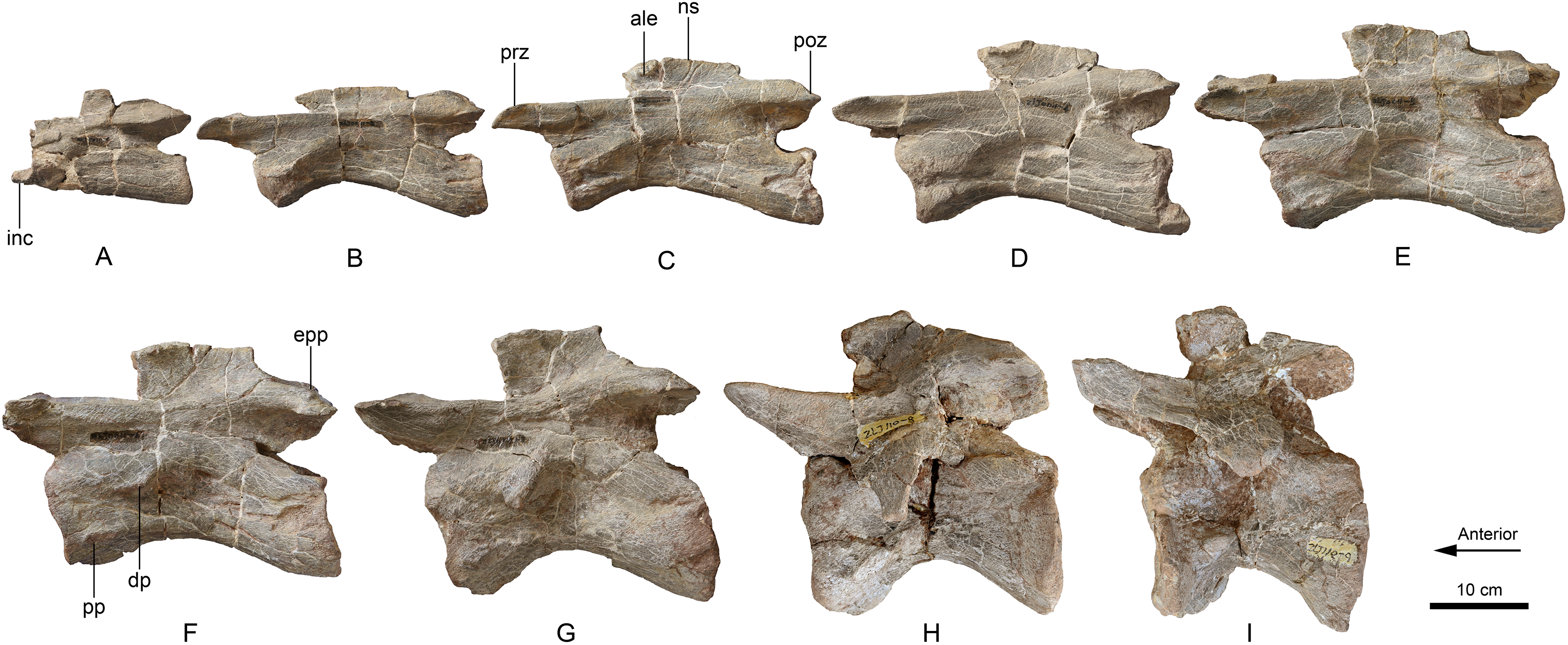
Holotype cervical vertebrae

The holotype specimen, LFGT-ZLJ0011, was discovered in 2007 in Jiudu Village in Konglongshan Town (formerly named Chuanjie Township), Lufeng County, Yunnan Province, China, in sediments belonging to the Shawan Member of the Lufeng Formation. It consists of a cranium, mandible, and nine cervical vertebrae. Parts of the posterior skeleton were also discovered but were lost during excavation. Following the specimen's collection and preparation, it was sent to Lufeng World Dinosaur Valley to be displayed. The type locality is close to where the fossils of the coelophysoid theropod Panguraptor were discovered.

The sauropodomorph remains were described as belonging to a new genus and species of dinosaur in 2024. The generic name, Lishulong, combines the Mandarin Chinese words 栗樹/栗树(lìshù)—meaning "chestnut tree"—after the name of the type locality, with 龍/龙 (lóng), meaning "dragon". The specific name, wangi, honors Wang Zheng-Ju, the discoverer of Lufengpithecus, for his contribution to vertebrate paleontology in Lufeng.

== Description ==
At 40 centimetres (16 in) long, the skull of Lishulong is larger than any other sauropodomorph from the Lufeng Formation. The cervical vertebrae are very large and elongated; the centrum of the first preserved cervical vertebra (the axis) is 16.3 centimetres (6.4 in) long, and the centrum of the last preserved cervical vertebra (the tenth consecutive bone in the series) is 19.9 centimetres (7.8 in) long. The related Yunnanosaurus youngi also preserves the same bones in the neck; its axis is slightly smaller, at 13 centimetres (5.1 in) long, and its tenth cervical is 17 centimetres (6.7 in) long. Y. youngi has been estimated to have a body length of around 13 metres (43 ft).

== Classification ==
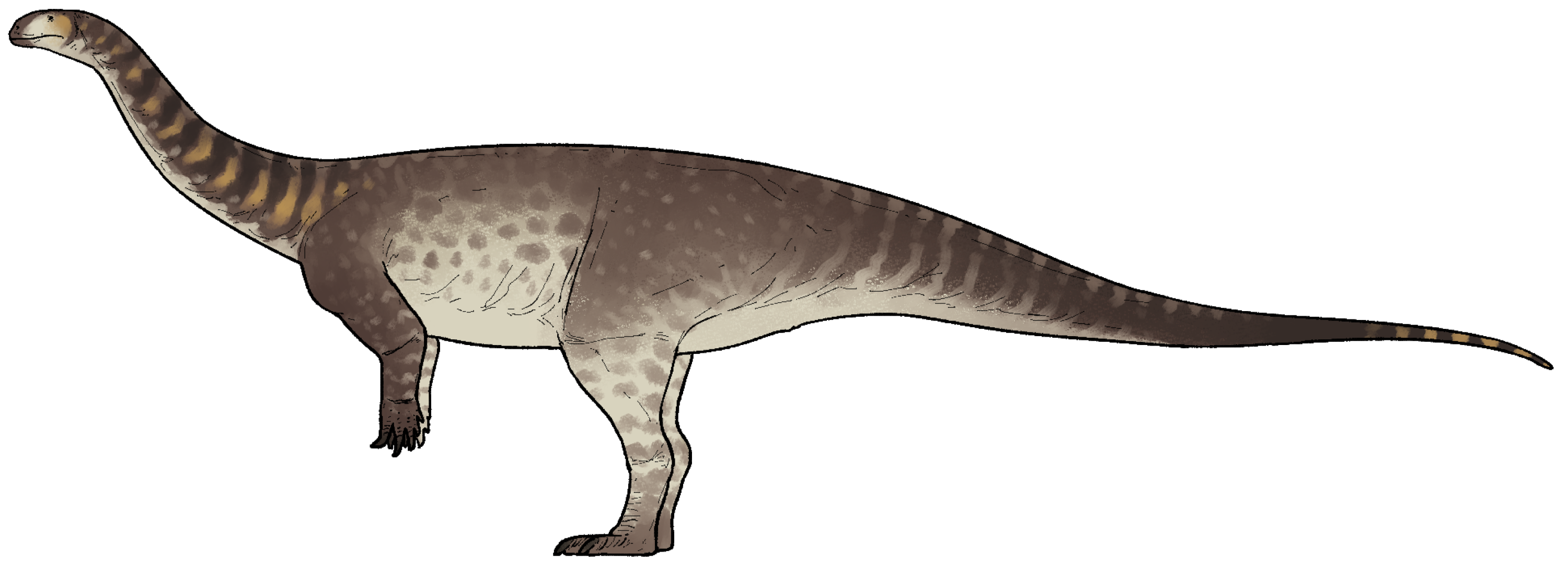
Speculative life restoration

Reconstructed skeleton

Zhang et al. (2024) included Lishulong in a phylogenetic analysis and found it to be a member of the Sauropodiformes, as the sister taxon to Yunnanosaurus.

- Sauropodiformes
  - Xingxiulong
  - - Jingshanosaurus
    - - - Lishulong
        - Yunnanosaurus
      - - - Riojasaurus
          - Eucnemesaurus spp.
        - - Seitaad
          - - Mussaurus
            - - Yizhousaurus
              - - Aardonyx
                - - Melanorosaurus (NMQR 1551)
                  - - Melanorosaurus (NMQR 3314)
                    - - Blikanasaurus
                      - - Camelotia
                        - - - Lessemsaurus
                            - Antetonitrus
                          - - Leonerasaurus
                            - - Gongxianosaurus
                              - - Pulanesaura
                                - - Isanosaurus
                                  - Sauropoda
