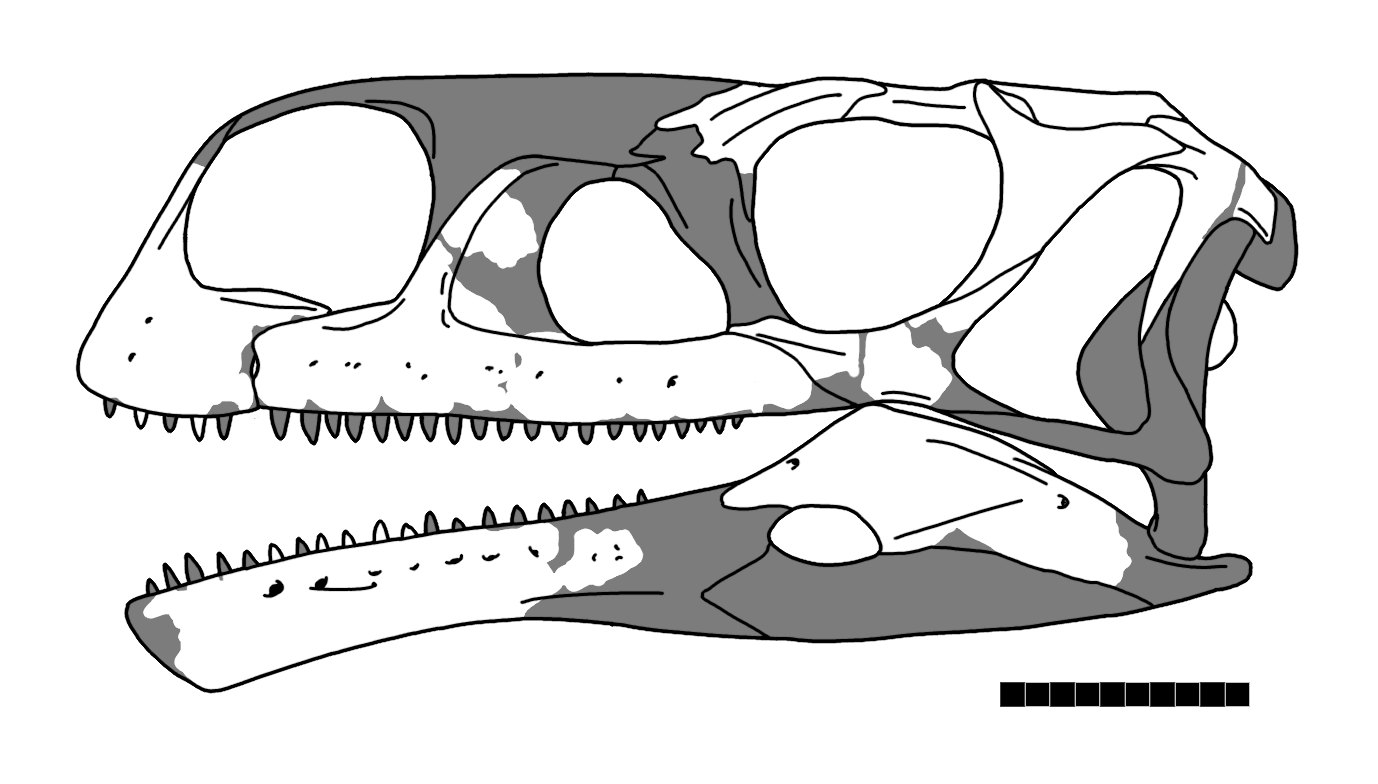
- Reconstruction of the skull

Scientific classification
- Kingdom: Animalia
- Phylum: Chordata
- Class: Reptilia
- Clade: Dinosauria
- Clade: Saurischia
- Clade: †Sauropodomorpha
- Clade: †Anchisauria
- Genus: †Aardonyx; Yates et al., 2010
- Species: †A. celestae

Binomial name
- †Aardonyx celestae Yates et al., 2010

= Aardonyx =

Aardonyx Temporal range: Early Jurassic, 201.3–190.8 Ma

Extinct genus of dinosaur of the Jurassic from South Africa

Aardonyx (Afrikaans aard, "earth" + Greek onux, "nail, claw") is a genus of basal sauropodomorph dinosaur. It is known from the type species Aardonyx celestae found from the Early Jurassic Elliot Formation of South Africa. A. celestae was named after Celeste Yates, who prepared much of the first known fossil material of the species. It has arm features that are intermediate between basal sauropodomorphs and more derived sauropods.

Based on the structure of the hind limbs and pelvic girdle of Aardonyx, the dinosaur normally moved bipedally but could drop to quadrupedal movement similar to Iguanodon. It shares some attributes with giant quadrupedal sauropods like Apatosaurus. Australian paleontologist Adam Yates and his team's discovery of the genus was published online before print in Proceedings of the Royal Society B in November 2009, and was scheduled to appear in the March 2010 issue. British paleontologist Paul Barrett of the Natural History Museum, London, who was not involved in the research, commented that the discovery of Aardonyx "helps to fill a marked gap in our knowledge of sauropod evolution, showing how a primarily two-legged animal could start to acquire the specific features necessary for a life spent on all-fours".

According to Matthew Bonnan, a co-author of the study, "We already knew that the earliest sauropods and near-sauropods would be bipeds. What Aardonyx shows us, however, is that walking quadrupedally and bearing weight on the inside of the foot is a trend that started very early in these dinosaurs, much earlier than previously hypothesized." Bonnan adds, "On a scientific level, it's really fulfilling to have a hypothesis on how you think dinosaurs got large, then to test that in the field and get back these kind of data — a new dinosaur — that really does start to fill in some of those anatomical gaps."

== Description ==
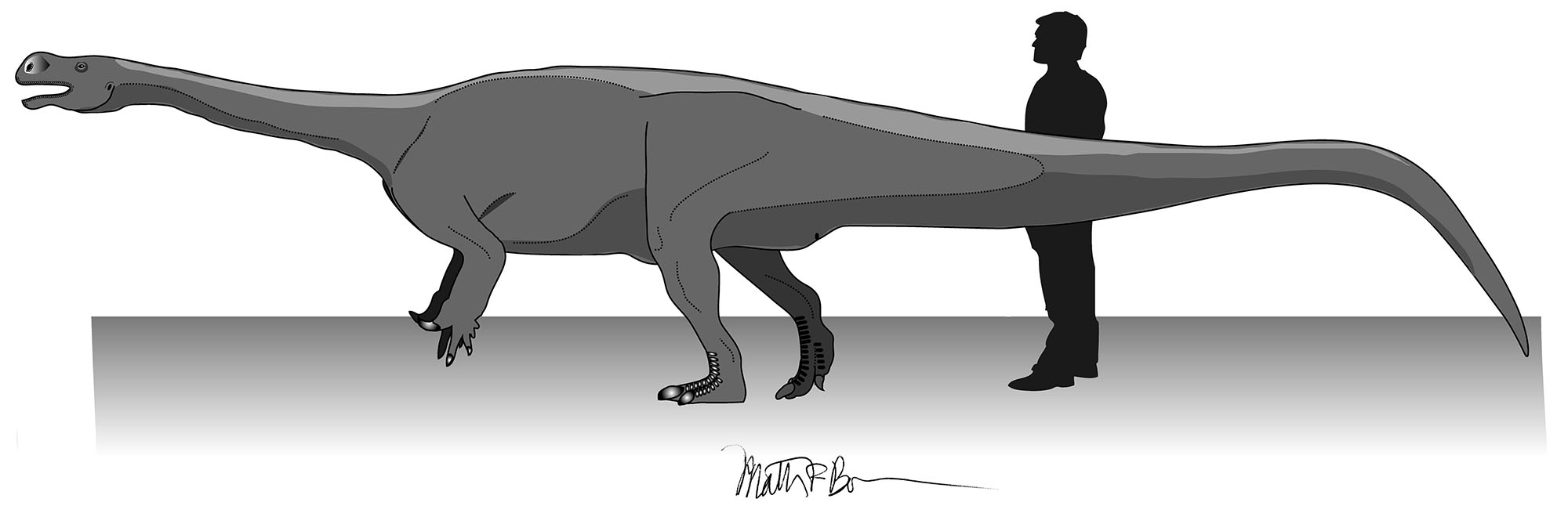
Aardonyx compared to a human in size

The genus is known from disarticulated bones belonging to two immature individuals. The material consists of cranial elements, vertebrae, dorsal and cervical ribs, gastralia, chevrons, elements of the pectoral and pelvic girdles, and bones of the fore and hind limbs, manus, and pes. The presence of these bones in a single dense accumulation in a localized channel fill suggests that they came from relatively complete carcasses. Both individuals are thought to have been less than 10 years old at the time of their death because of the lack of peripheral rest lines in the cortices of sampled bones. Additional evidence for immaturity at the time of death includes calcified cartilage at the articular end of the scapula.

== Classification ==
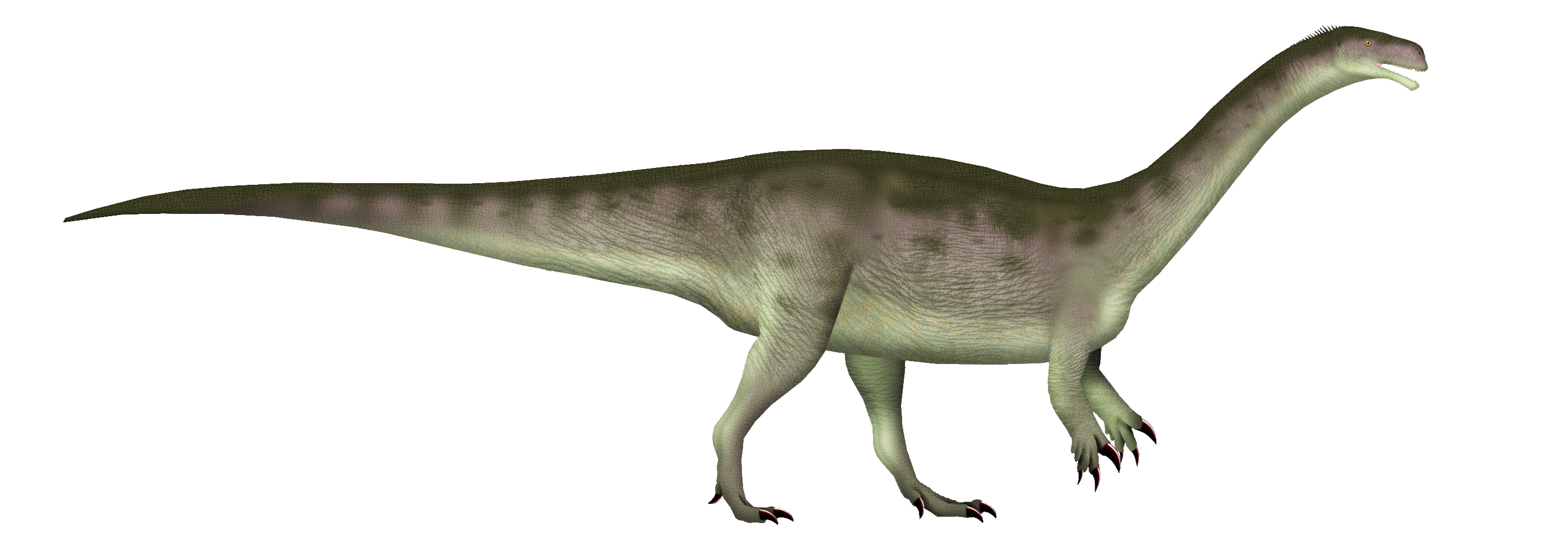
Life restoration

Aardonyx is thought to be the sister taxon of a sauropodomorph clade containing Melanorosaurus and sauropods, which are all obligatory quadrupeds, based on a phylogenetic analysis conducted along with the first description of the genus. Many features of the skeleton support this relationship. These include derived traits seen in the vertebrae (such as hyposphenes that are as deep as the neural canal and mid-cervical neural spines that are less than twice as long as high) as well as the appendicular skeleton (such as the position of the fourth trochanter over the midlength of the femur and an adult femur length exceeding 600 mm).

Cladogram showing the position of Aardonyx within Sauropodomorpha
after Yates et al., 2010:

- Sauropodomorpha
  - Plateosauridae
  - - Riojasauridae
    - - Gryponyx
      - Massospondylidae
      - - Yunnanosaurus
        - Jingshanosaurus
        - Anchisauria
          - Anchisaurus
          - - Aardonyx
            - - Melanorosaurus
              - Sauropoda
                - - Antetonitrus
                  - Lessemsaurus
                - - Gongxianosaurus
                  - - Tazoudasaurus
                    - Vulcanodon
                    - Eusauropoda

The following cladogram shows the position of Aardonyx within Massopoda, according to Oliver W. M. Rauhut and colleagues, 2020:

- Massopoda
  - - Eucnemesaurus
    - Riojasaurus
  - - Sarahsaurus
    - - Massospondylidae
        - - Yunnanosaurus
          - - Jingshanosaurus
            - Seitaad
        - - - Coloradisaurus
            - - Glacialisaurus
              - Lufengosaurus
          - - Massospondylus
            - - Adeopapposaurus
              - Leyesaurus
      - Sauropodiformes
        - Xingxiulong
        - - - Anchisaurus
            - Leonerasaurus
          - - Mussaurus
            - - Aardonyx
              - - Sefapanosaurus
                - - Meroktenos
                  - - Melanorosaurus
                    - - Camelotia
                      - - - Lessemsaurus
                          - - Antetonitrus
                            - Ingentia
                        - - Blikanasaurus
                          - - Pulanesaura
                            - - Gongxianosaurus
                              - - Schleitheimia
                                - - Isanosaurus
                                  - - Tazoudasaurus
                                    - Sauropoda

== Paleobiology ==
=== Feeding ===
Aardonyx shows a transition toward the bulk-browsing form of feeding characteristic of sauropods. The jaws of Aardonyx are narrow and V-shaped with a pointed symphysis, a plesiomorphic characteristic shared with other basal sauropodomorphs. In sauropods, the jaws are broad and U-shaped to allow for a wider bite. The absence of a lateral ridge at the caudal end of the dentary is indicative of a loss of fleshy cheeks. This is seen as an adaptation for a wider gape to facilitate bulk browsing and is observed in nearly all sauropods. The lateral neurovascular foramina of the maxilla of Aardonyx are smaller than those of other basal sauropodomorphs, and indicate that there was a reduction in blood supply to the buccal tissues and thus a loss of fleshy cheeks. The development of lateral plates along the alveolar margins of some bones of the skull would have helped brace the lingual sides of the teeth against bucco-lingual forces during foliage stripping.

The presence of plesiomorphic V-shaped jaws along with the absence of fleshy cheeks is an unusual characteristic of Aardonyx. Previously, it was thought that broader jaws evolved before the reduction and loss in fleshy cheeks as an adaptation toward bulk-browsing in sauropods. The sauropod Chinshakiangosaurus possessed jaws that were U-shaped, while still retaining fleshy cheeks, the opposite of the condition seen in Aardonyx. Because Chinshakiangosaurus is a more derived sauropodomorph, this suggests that a wide, cheekless gape may have evolved twice in Sauropodomorpha: once with Aardonyx and again with sauropods more advanced than Chinshakiangosaurus.

=== Locomotion ===
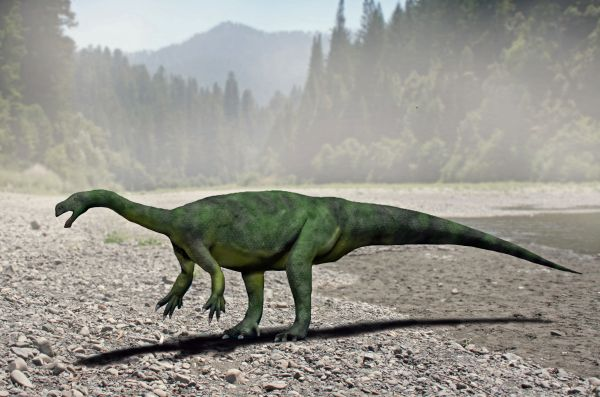
Restoration

Characteristics of the limbs of Aardonyx suggest that it was habitually bipedal. Evidence for bipedalism can be seen in the forelimbs; the structure of the radius and ulna limited the degree to which the manus could be pronated, and the length of the humerus is only 72 percent that of the femur. However, characteristics found in both the fore and hind limbs of Aardonyx show a trend toward more habitual quadrupedalism that would eventually lead to the obligatory quadrupedalism seen in sauropods. The proximal end of the ulna possesses an incipient craniolateral process that gives the bone a y-shape similar to, although more subtle than, those of obligatory quadrupedal sauropodomorphs. The radius is shifted cranially, and a radial fossa allows for the ulna to cradle the radius craniolaterally. These characteristics suggest that there was a development towards greater quadrupedalism in Aardonyx. Although the hindlimbs of Aardonyx clearly show evidence for bipedalism (such as the retention of a convex proximal lateral profile of the femur and the position of the cranial trochanter far from the lateral margin of the femur), there is also evidence that indicates a shift toward quadrupedalism. Features of the femur suggests that the gait of Aardonyx was slower than that of more basal sauropodomorphs. The shaft of the femur is straighter and the fourth trochanter is more distally placed. The repositioning of the fourth trochanter to a more distal position causes the M. caudofemoralis longus muscle, the main femoral retractor muscle, to have greater leverage (more mechanical advantage) but conversely a decrease in the velocity of femoral retraction; consequently, Aardonyx was a powerful but slower walker than typical prosauropods.

Another characteristic that suggests a slower gait in Aardonyx is the robustness of metatarsal in comparison with those of other basal sauropodomorphs. This is evidence of a more medial, or entaxonic, position of the weight-bearing axis of the foot, as opposed to a more mesaxonic position where the weight-bearing axis runs through digit III. The development of entaxony in Aardonyx provides further evidence for its reduced cursorial ability and wider gauge-gait, which is thought to have preceded obligatory quadrupedalism in sauropodomorphs. Previously, it was thought that entaxony developed after the divergence of Vulcanodon due to the presence of mesaxony in the genus. However, the presence of mesaxony in Vulcanodon can be now considered an evolutionary reversal given the clear presence of entaxony in Aardonyx.

=== Growth ===
The osteohistology of Aardonyx shows that it grew rapidly, but that its bodily growth was seasonally interrupted. Evidence for this comes from greatly vascularized woven-parallel complexes that contain regular growth marks, with its early and mid-ontogenetic stages exhibiting fibrolamellar complexes.
