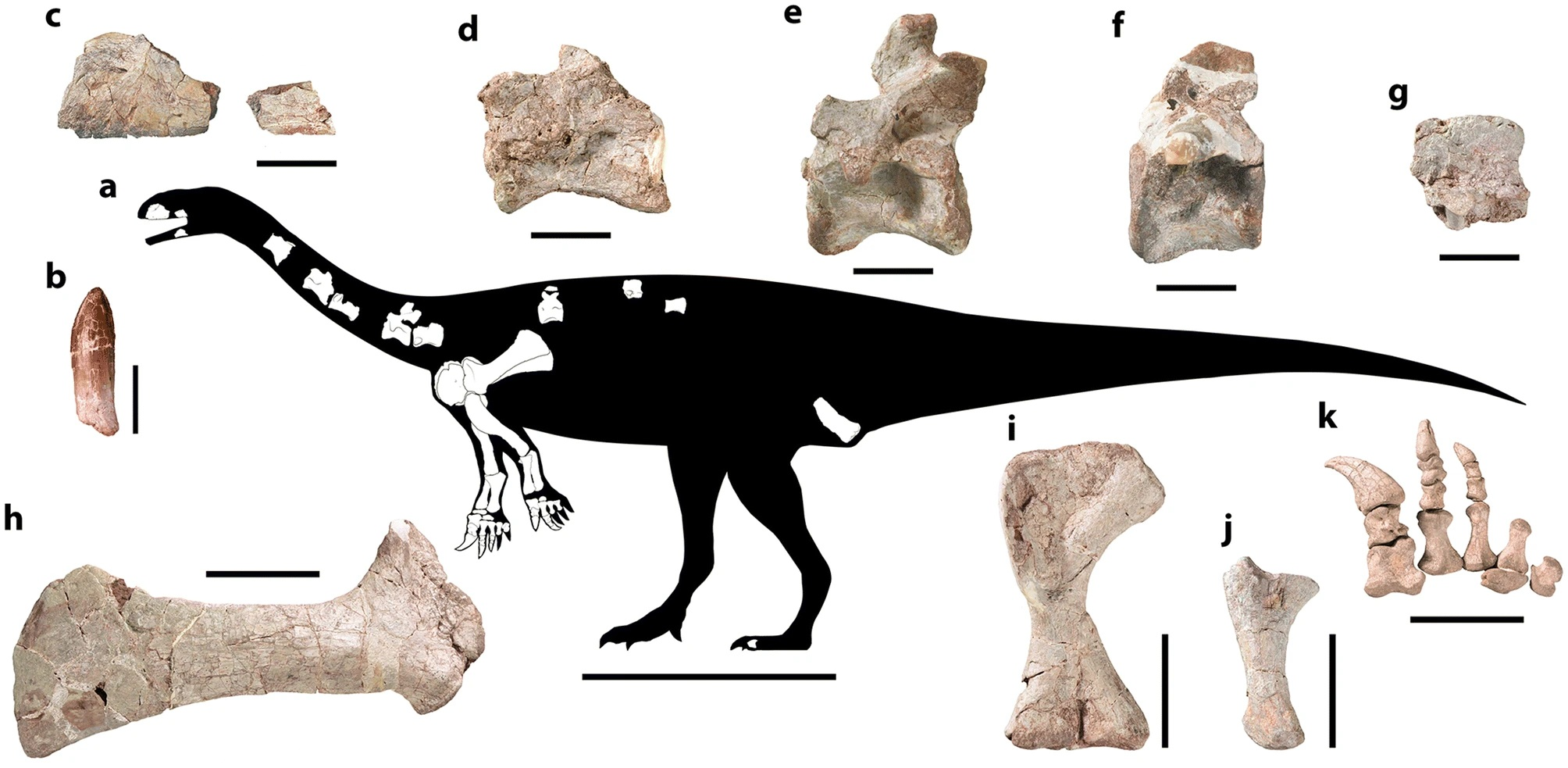
- Skeletal restoration

Scientific classification
- Kingdom: Animalia
- Phylum: Chordata
- Class: Reptilia
- Clade: Dinosauria
- Clade: Saurischia
- Clade: †Sauropodomorpha
- Clade: †Anchisauria
- Genus: †Irisosaurus; Peyre de Fabrègues et al., 2020

Type species
- †Irisosaurus yimenensis Peyre de Fabrègues et al., 2020

= Irisosaurus =

Irisosaurus Temporal range: Early Jurassic, Hettangian

Extinct genus of reptiles

Irisosaurus (meaning "iridescent lizard" after the iridescent clouds of Yunnan Province, China) is an extinct genus of sauropodiform sauropodomorph dinosaur, from the Fengjiahe Formation of China. The type species, Irisosaurus yimenensis was formally described in 2020. It was the sister taxon to Mussaurus.

== Discovery and naming ==
The holotype, CVEB 21901, was found in the rocks of the Fengjiahe Formation in Yimen County, Yunnan, during the summer of 2018. In 2020, it was assigned to the new genus and species, Irisosaurus yimenensis, named after the county it was found and "the famous iridescent clouds of Yunnan Province" (Chinese: 彩云之南; literally "south of colorful clouds", the likely origin of Yunnan's name).

== Description ==
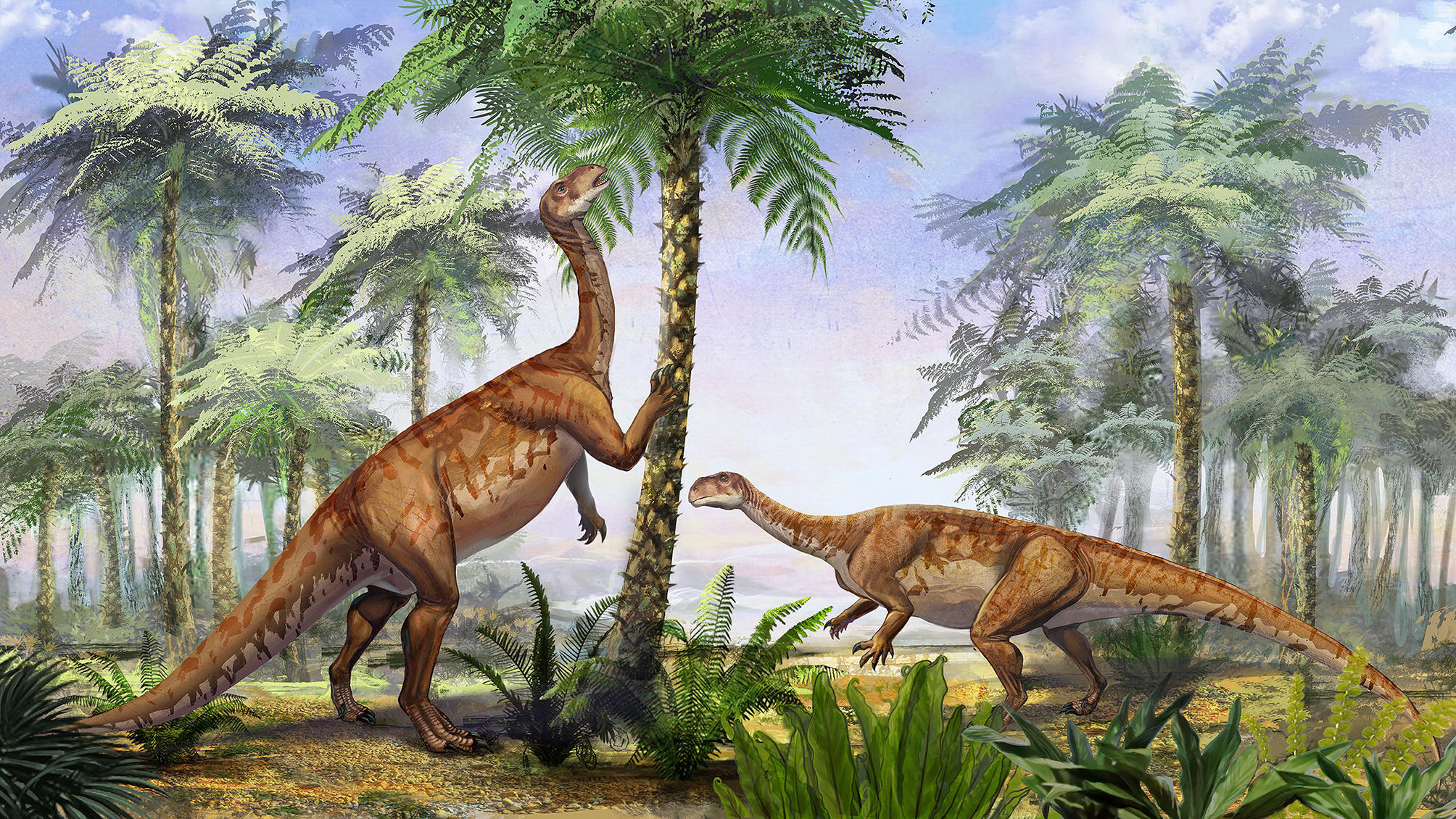
Restoration of two individuals

The holotype of Irisosaurus shows a unique combination of traits that in themselves are not unique. There is a large and deep neurovascular foramen on the perinarial fossa. The premaxillary ramus of the maxilla is higher than it is long prior to the nasal process. The proximal half of metacarpal V is strongly asymmetrical.

Size comparison
