= Yunnan Provincial Museum =

Museum in Kunming, China

Coordinates: 24°57′05″N 102°45′10″E

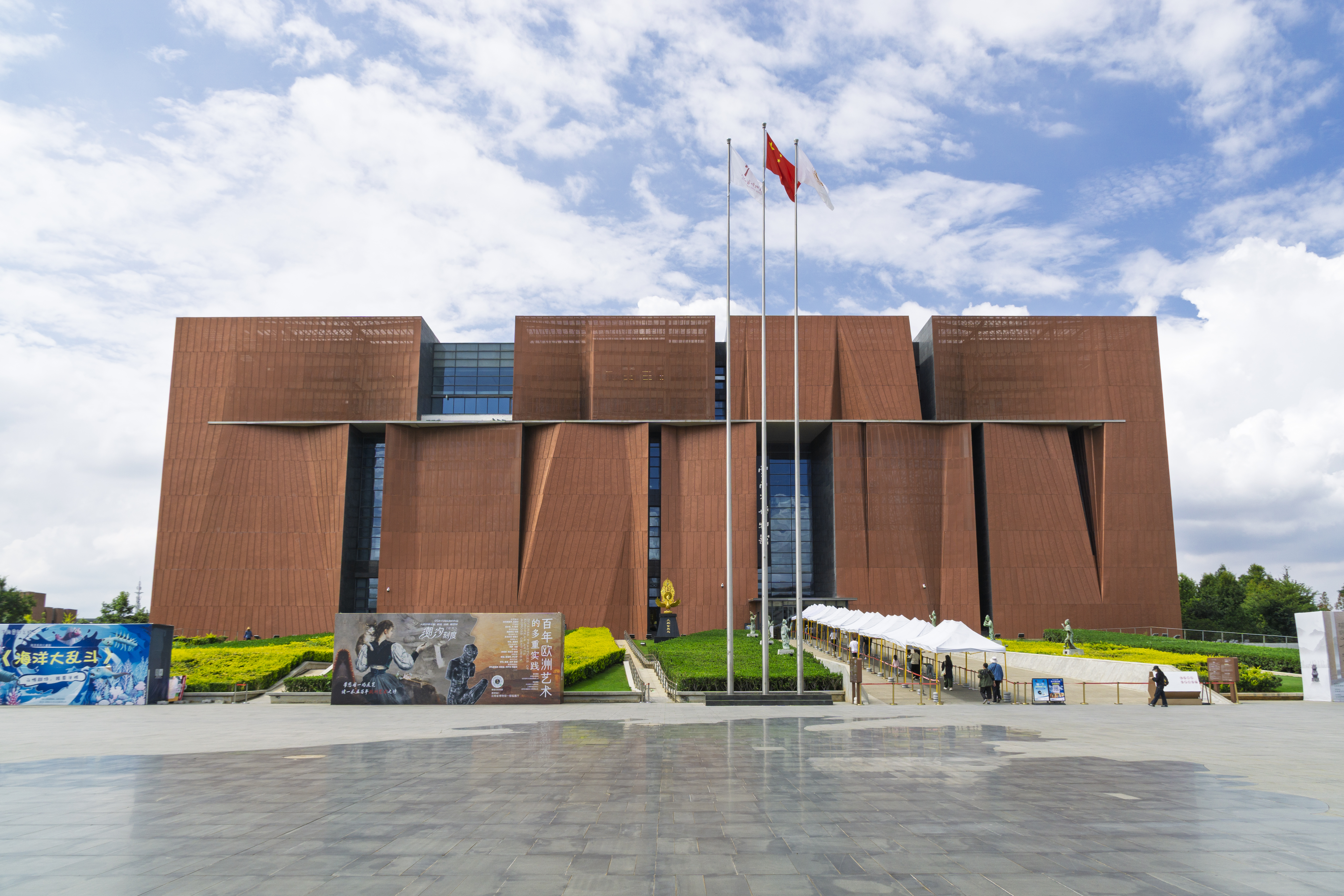
The new museum.

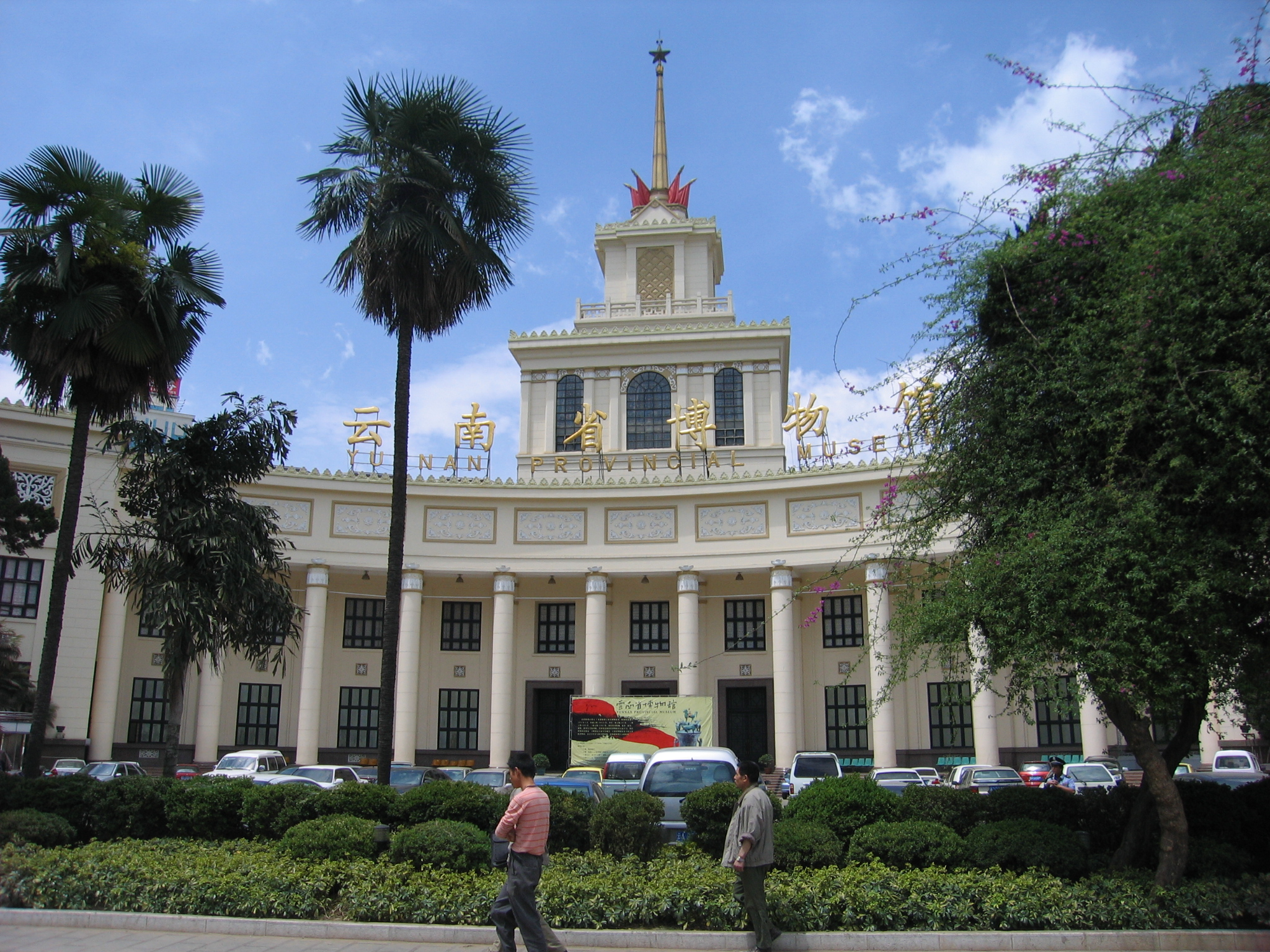
The old museum.

Yunnan Provincial Museum (Chinese: 云南省博物馆; pinyin: Yúnnán Shěng Bówùguǎn) is a cultural heritage museum in Kunming, China. Established in 1951, it houses an exhibition centered on Yunnan's ethnic minorities, as well as a collection of artifacts from tomb excavations at Jinning on the southern rim of Lake Dian.

The old museum is on Wuyi Road in Wuhua District. The new museum is located at No.6393 of Guangfu Road in Guandu District, which has officially opened its doors to the public on May 18, 2015.

== Collections ==
The museum's collection includes several hundred paintings, calligraphy, and other artifacts that once belonged to Gao Yunhuai, a former Nationalist military officer. The artifacts were confiscated by the Red Guards in 1966, at the start of the Cultural Revolution.

== Staff ==
As of 2001, the museum's curator was Li Kunsheng.

== See also ==
- List of museums in China
- Kunming Museum
