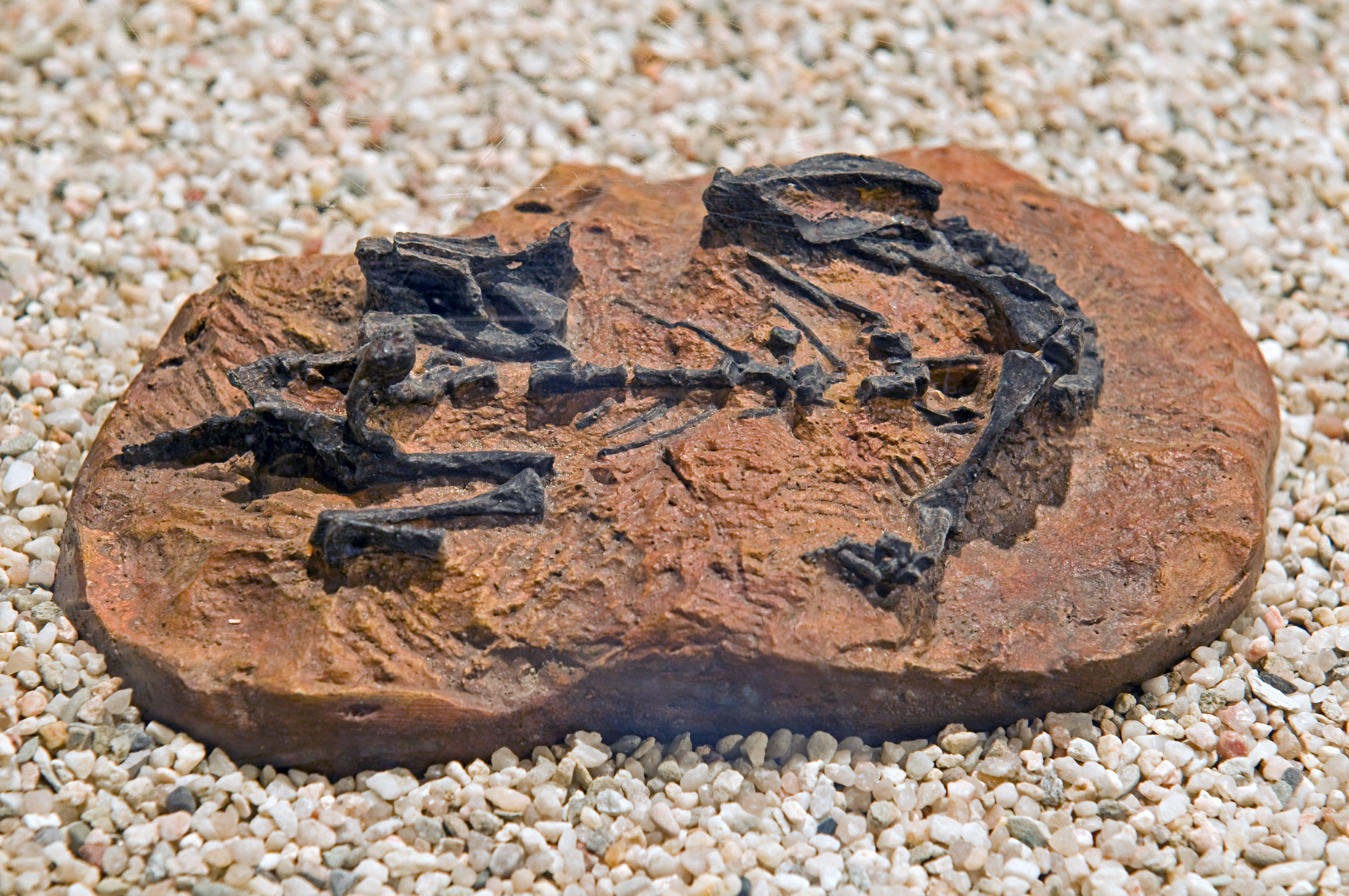
- Fossil juvenile skeleton

Scientific classification
- Kingdom: Animalia
- Phylum: Chordata
- Class: Reptilia
- Clade: Dinosauria
- Clade: Saurischia
- Clade: †Sauropodomorpha
- Family: †Mussauridae; Bonaparte & Vince, 1979
- Genus: †Mussaurus; Bonaparte & Vince, 1979

Type species
- †Mussaurus patagonicus Bonaparte & Vince, 1979

= Mussaurus =

Mussaurus Temporal range: Early Jurassic, Sinemurian

Extinct genus of dinosaurs

Mussaurus (meaning "mouse lizard") is a genus of herbivorous sauropodomorph dinosaur that lived in southern Argentina during the Sinemurian stage of the Early Jurassic. It receives its name from the small size of the skeletons of juvenile and infant individuals, which were once the only known specimens of the genus. However, since Mussaurus is now known from adult specimens, the name is something of a misnomer.

In its early stages of life, Mussaurus was a small quadrupedal herbivore, walking on all four legs. As it grew up, the changes in body proportions may have led its centre of mass to move backwards towards its pelvis. Adults would have been medium-sized bipedal herbivores, measuring up to 8 metres (26 ft) long and weighing up to 1.2–1.6 metric tons (1.3–1.8 short tons).

Numerous specimens of varying age found in a single locality suggest that Mussaurus is one of the earliest dinosaurs to have lived in a gregarious lifestyle. With its possible origin from the Triassic, this complex social behaviour may have given rise to the sauropods' early success as the largest herbivores on land. Mussaurus also possessed anatomical features that suggest a close, possibly transitional evolutionary relationship with true sauropods.

== Discovery ==
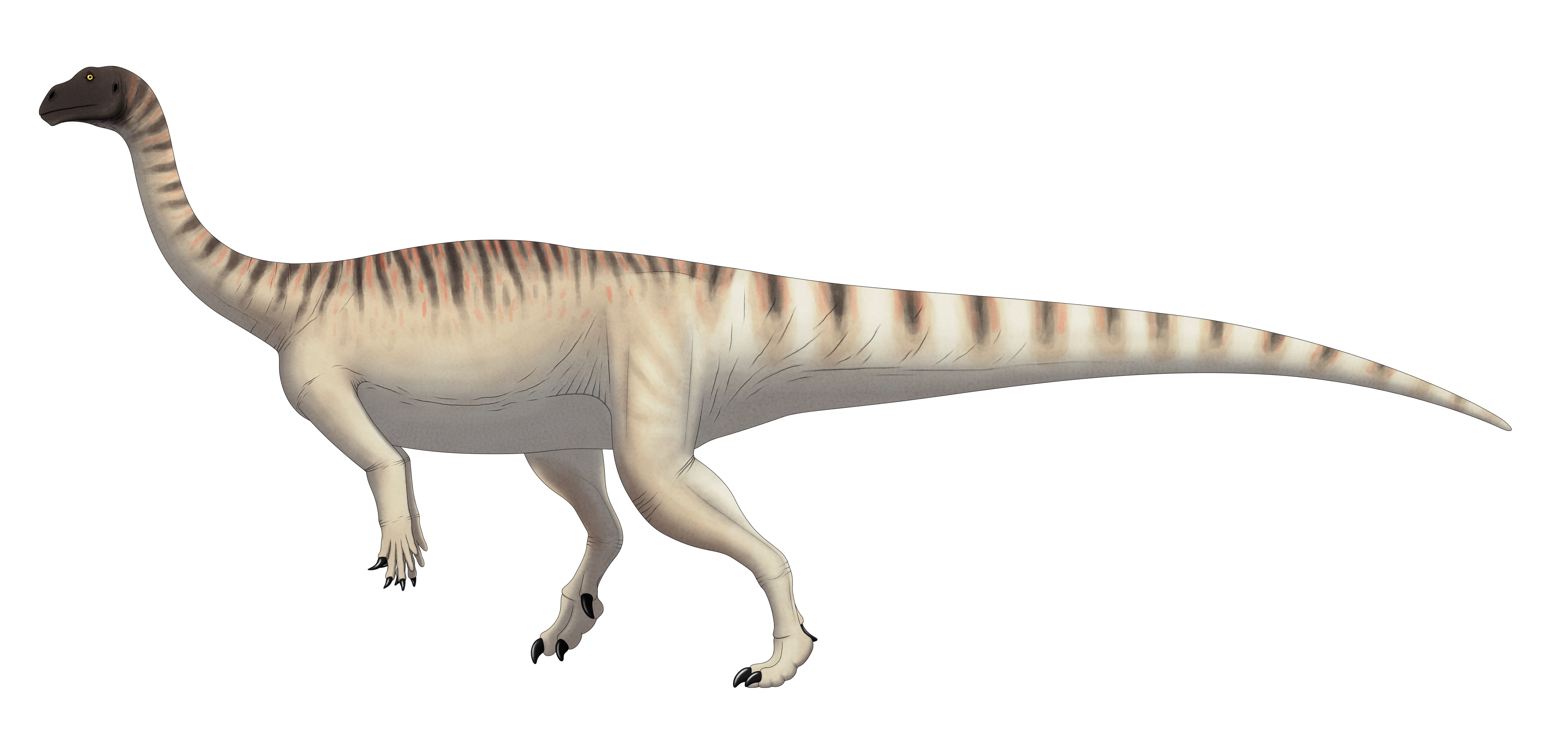
Life restoration of adult Mussaurus

Infant and juvenile fossils of Mussaurus were first discovered by an expedition led by Jose Bonaparte during the 1970s to the Laguna Colorada Formation, where the team found fossilized eggs and hatchlings, which added insight into the reproductive strategies of Mussaurus and other sauropodomorph dinosaurs. The age of the formation is estimated between 192.78 ± 0.14 Ma and 192.74 ± 0.14 Ma. The first adult specimens of Mussaurus were described in 2013, although some of these specimens had first been described in 1980 and were originally attributed to the genus Plateosaurus.

== Classification ==
Previous to the discovery of adult specimens of Mussaurus, the phylogenetic position of this taxon was difficult to establish. Infant and juvenile fossils are known to show more basal traits than adult specimens of the same taxon. Furthermore, the recently discovered of one subadult and three adult specimens assigned to Mussaurus are more complete than other material assigned to it. Therefore, a cladistic analysis of basal sauropodomorphs performed by Otero and Pol (2013) to test the phylogenetic relationships of Mussaurus, included information only from adult specimens. The following cladogram is simplified after their analysis (relationships outside Plateosauria are not shown).

- Plateosauria
  - Ruehleia
  - Plateosauridae
    - Unaysaurus
    - Plateosaurus engelhardti
    - Plateosaurus gracilis
    - Plateosaurus ingens
  - Massopoda
    - Riojasauridae
      - Eucnemesaurus
      - Riojasaurus
    - - - Ignavusaurus
        - Sarahsaurus
      - - Massospondylidae
          - - Coloradisaurus
            - Glacialisaurus
            - Lufengosaurus
          - - Massospondylus
            - - Adeopapposaurus
              - Leyesaurus
        - Sauropodiformes
          - Jingshanosaurus
          - Anchisauria
            - Anchisaurus
            - Seitaad
            - Yunnanosaurus
            - - Mussaurus
              - - Aardonyx
                - - Leonerasaurus
                  - - Melanorosauridae
                      - Camelotia
                      - Melanorosaurus
                    - Sauropoda
                      - Blikanasaurus
                      - - - Antetonitrus
                          - Lessemsaurus
                        - - Gongxianosaurus
                          - - Isanosaurus
                            - Gravisauria
                              - Vulcanodontidae
                                - Tazoudasaurus
                                - Vulcanodon
                              - Eusauropoda
                                - - Barapasaurus
                                  - Patagosaurus
                                - - Shunosaurus
                                  - - - Omeisaurus
                                      - Mamenchisaurus
                                    - - Cetiosaurus
                                      - Neosauropoda

== Palaeobiology ==
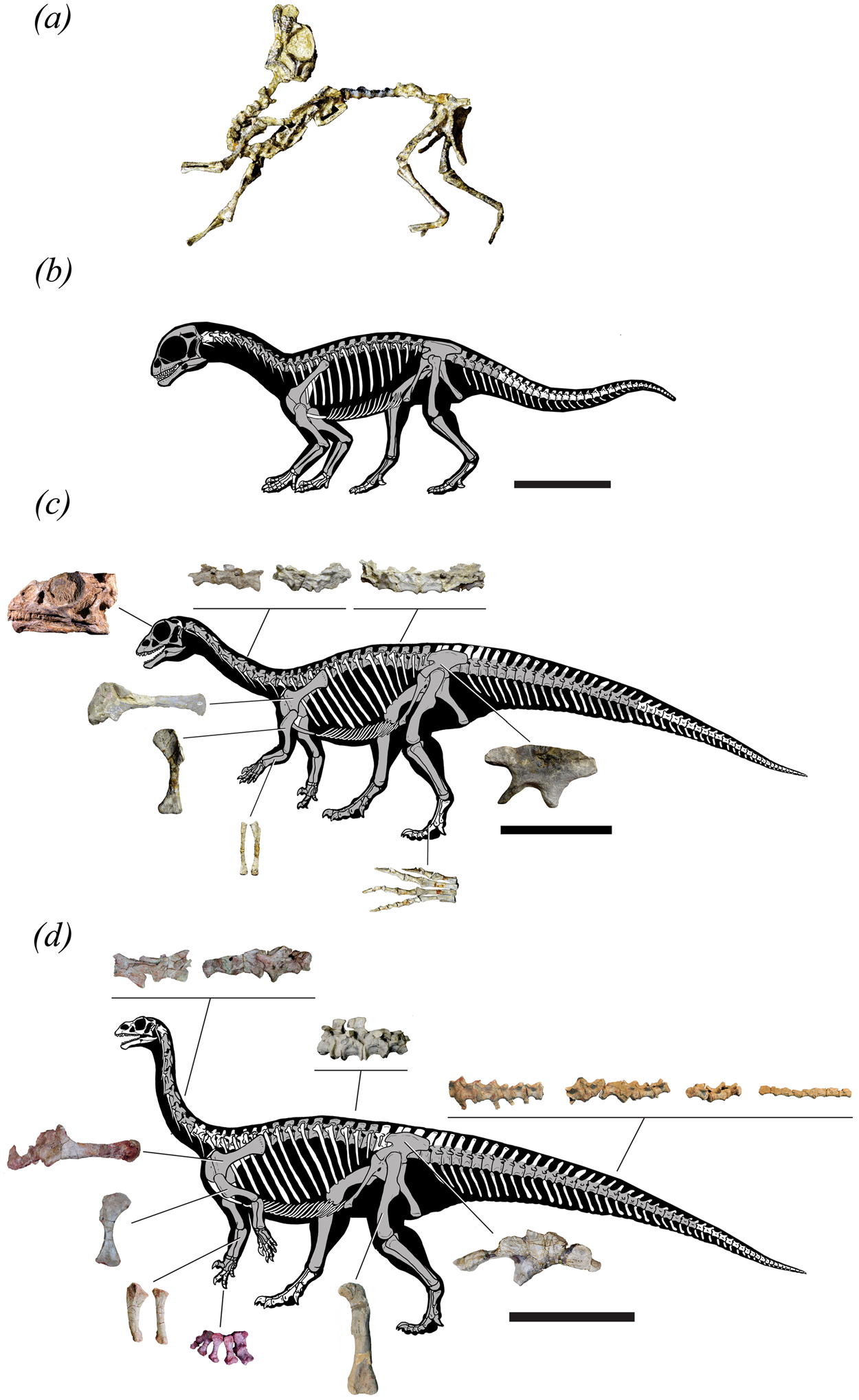
Mussaurus specimens. (a,b) hatchling, (c) yearling, (d) adult. Scale bars represent 5 cm (a), (b) 15 cm (c) and 100 cm (d). To better show isolated bones in (c), we used specimen PVL 4587, of the same ontogenetic age as MPM 1813 (except for the ilium, which belongs to MPM 1813).

Mussaurus specimens have been found in association with nests that are believed to contain multiple eggs apiece. The skeletons of Mussaurus infants were small, measuring about 20 centimetres (7.9 in) long and weighing about 53.3–76.5 grams (1.88–2.70 oz). This is about the size of a small lizard. Juveniles differed from adults in proportion in addition to size and mass. As is common for dinosaurs, juvenile Mussaurus had tall skulls with short snouts and large eyes. These proportions are common in many infant vertebrates and are often associated with species that provide parental care during the vulnerable early stages of life. Adults are expected to have longer snouts and necks, as typical in early sauropodomorphs. Ignacio Cerda and Diego Pol reported putative evidence of medullary bone tissue from a specimen of Mussaurus in 2013, but both authors with Anusuya Chinsamy subsequently argued in 2014 that this tissue most likely represents a pathologically formed tissue instead based on histological features.

=== Social behaviour ===
As of 2021, Mussaurus represents the earliest unequivocal evidence of complex social behaviour in dinosaurs, with over 100 eggs and skeletal specimens of 80 individuals ranging from embryos to adults found in the same locality. This discovery predates the previous records of herd-living dinosaurs by at least 40 million years. It is thought that this behaviour has been originated from the Triassic period, leading them to become successful as large terrestrial herbivores.

=== Growth ===
A study published in May 2019 shows that in its first year of life, during which it weighed 6.5–10.2 kilograms (14–22 lb), M. patagonicus probably a was quadruped, walking on all four limbs. Changes in the relative proportions of its body during growth (ontogeny) may have caused its centre of mass to move backwards towards its pelvis, resulting in the animal adopting a two-legged (bipedal) stance later in life. Adult Mussaurus had a tail length of 3.13 metres (10.3 ft) and weighed up to 1.2–1.6 metric tons (1.3–1.8 short tons), significantly larger than subadults which weighed about 106.2–557 kilograms (234–1,228 lb). Individuals of such size would have measured up to 8 metres (26 ft) in total body length. It is estimated that Mussaurus would have been sexually mature at 23 to 31 years of age, and reached somatic maturity after 14 years.
