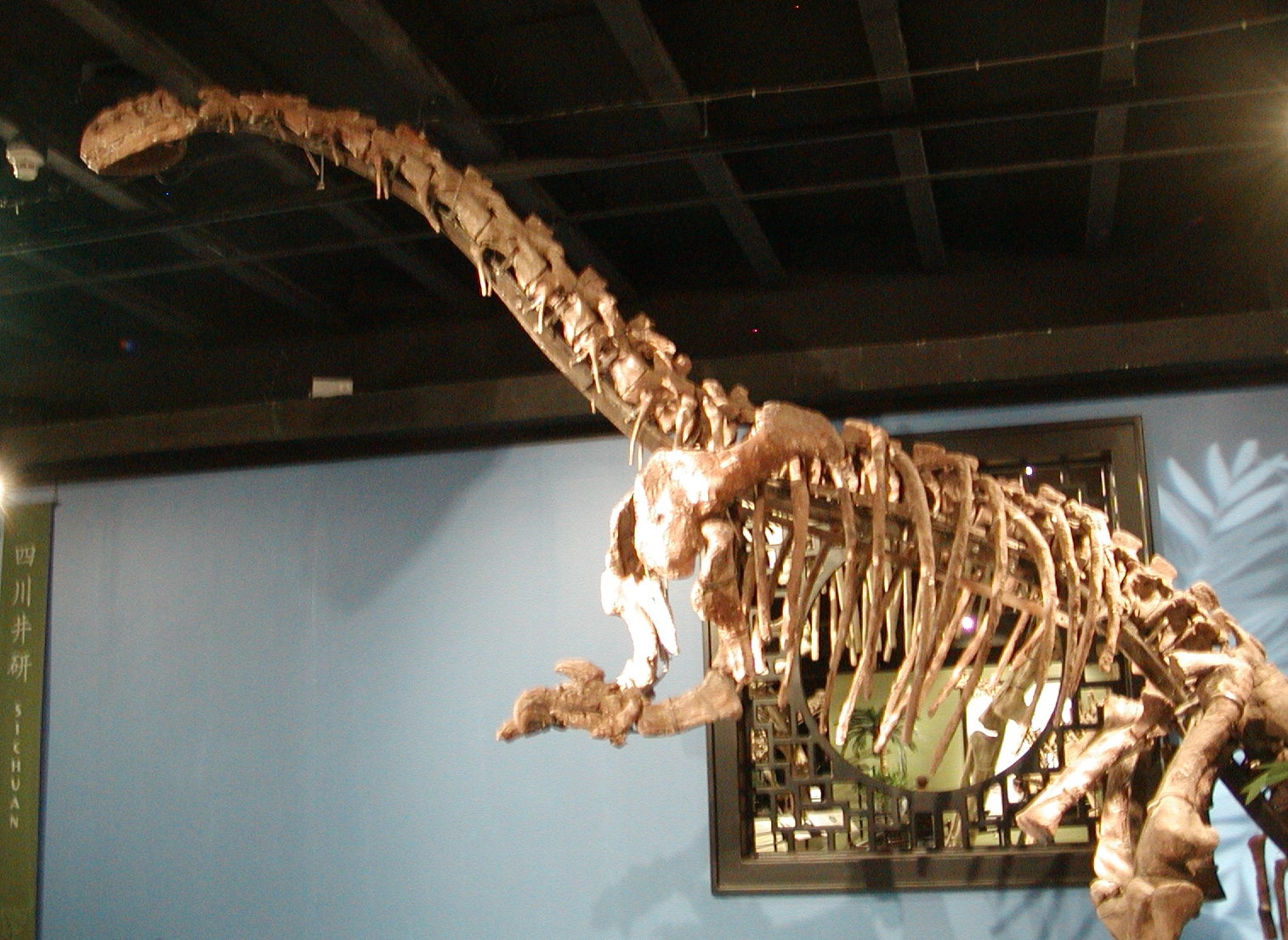
- Skeleton of Jingshanosaurus xinwaensis at the Miami Science Museum
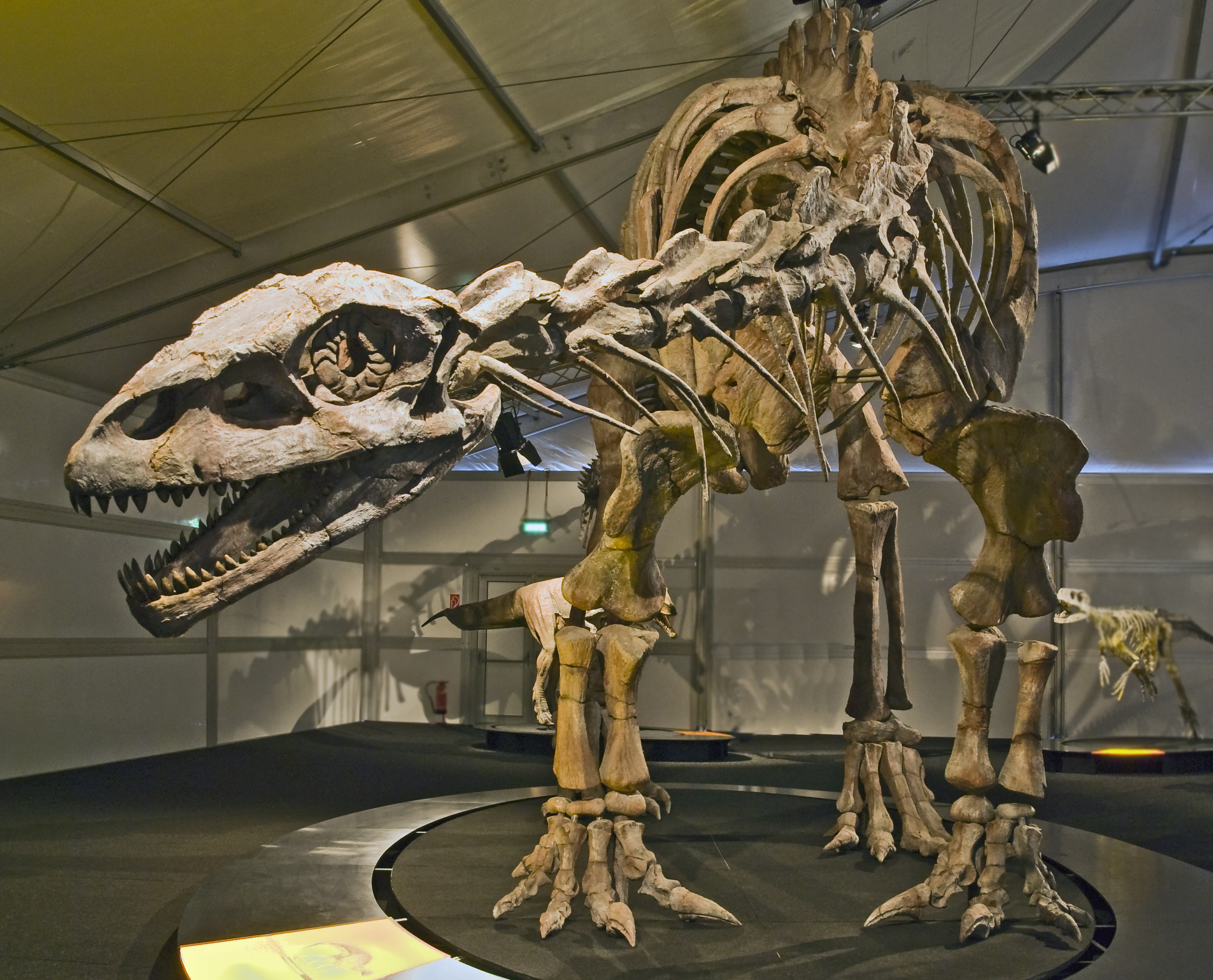
- Lessemsaurus sauropoides

Scientific classification
- Kingdom: Animalia
- Phylum: Chordata
- Class: Reptilia
- Clade: Dinosauria
- Clade: Saurischia
- Clade: †Sauropodomorpha
- Clade: †Massopoda
- Clade: †Sauropodiformes; Sereno, 2007

Subgroups
- †Chuxiongosaurus?
- †Jingshanosaurus
- †Lishulong
- †Qianlong
- †Schleitheimia
- †Seitaad
- †Xingxiulong
- †Yunnanosaurus
- †Anchisauria Galton & Upchurch, 2004
  - †Aardonyx
  - †Anchisaurus
  - †Irisosaurus
  - †Lamplughsaura
  - †Leonerasaurus
  - †Mussaurus
  - †Sefapanosaurus
  - †Yizhousaurus
  - †Lessemsauridae?
  - †Melanorosauridae
  - †Sauropoda
Sauropodiformes incertae sedis
- †Amygdalodon
- †Isanosaurus
- †Kotasaurus
- †Meroktenos

= Sauropodiformes =

Sauropodiformes Temporal range: Late Triassic - Late Cretaceous, 228–66 Ma

Extinct clade of dinosaurs

Sauropodiformes (meaning "in the form of a sauropod") is an extinct clade of sauropodomorph dinosaurs. It includes the true sauropods as well as their closest non-sauropod relatives. This clade was named in 2007 by the researcher Paul Sereno.

Sauropodiformes was given a phylogenetic definition by Sereno when he named it. He gave it a node-based definition as the least inclusive clade containing both Saltasaurus and Mussaurus. However, Blair McPhee and colleagues redefined Sauropodiformes in 2014 to have a stem based definition. The new definition they provided was that it would be the least inclusive clade containing Saltasaurus, but not Massospondylus. The reason the authors provided for this redefinition was the taxonomic instability of Mussaurus and the importance of the evolutionary transition that occurred within this group including the emergence of massive sizes and the evolution of quadrupedality.

Below is a cladogram of Sauropodiformes after Alania and colleagues, published in 2025.

- Massopoda
  - Seitaad
  - - Riojasauridae
    - - SMF 13.5.37
      - - Massospondylidae
        - - Sauropodiformes
            - - Yunnanosaurus huangi
              - - Xingxiulong
                - - - Jingshanosaurus
                    - Lufengosaurus magnus
                  - - Yizhousaurus
                    - - Yunnanosaurus youngi
                      - - - Irisosaurus
                          - Yunnanosaurus robustus
                        - - Anchisauria
                            - - - Leonerasaurus
                                - - - Lamplughsaura
                                    - Mussaurus
                                  - - Anchisaurus
                                    - - Aardonyx
                                      - Sefapanosaurus
                              - - NMQR 1551
                                - - Melanorosaurus
                                  - - Sauropoda
                                      - - Blikanasaurus
                                        - - Lessemsauridae
                                          - - Pulanesaura
                                            - - Gongxianosaurus
                                              - - Schleitheimia
                                                - - Isanosaurus
                                                  - Gravisauria'

== See also ==
- List of sauropod species
