= Hop Creek =

Stream in South Dakota, United States

Coordinates: 44°07′55″N 103°46′02″W

Hop Creek is a stream in the U.S. state of South Dakota.

Hop Creek received its name from the abundant hops on its course.

== See also ==
- List of rivers of South Dakota
