= Kunming Museum =

Museum in Kunming, China

Coordinates: 25°2′7″N 102°43′37″E

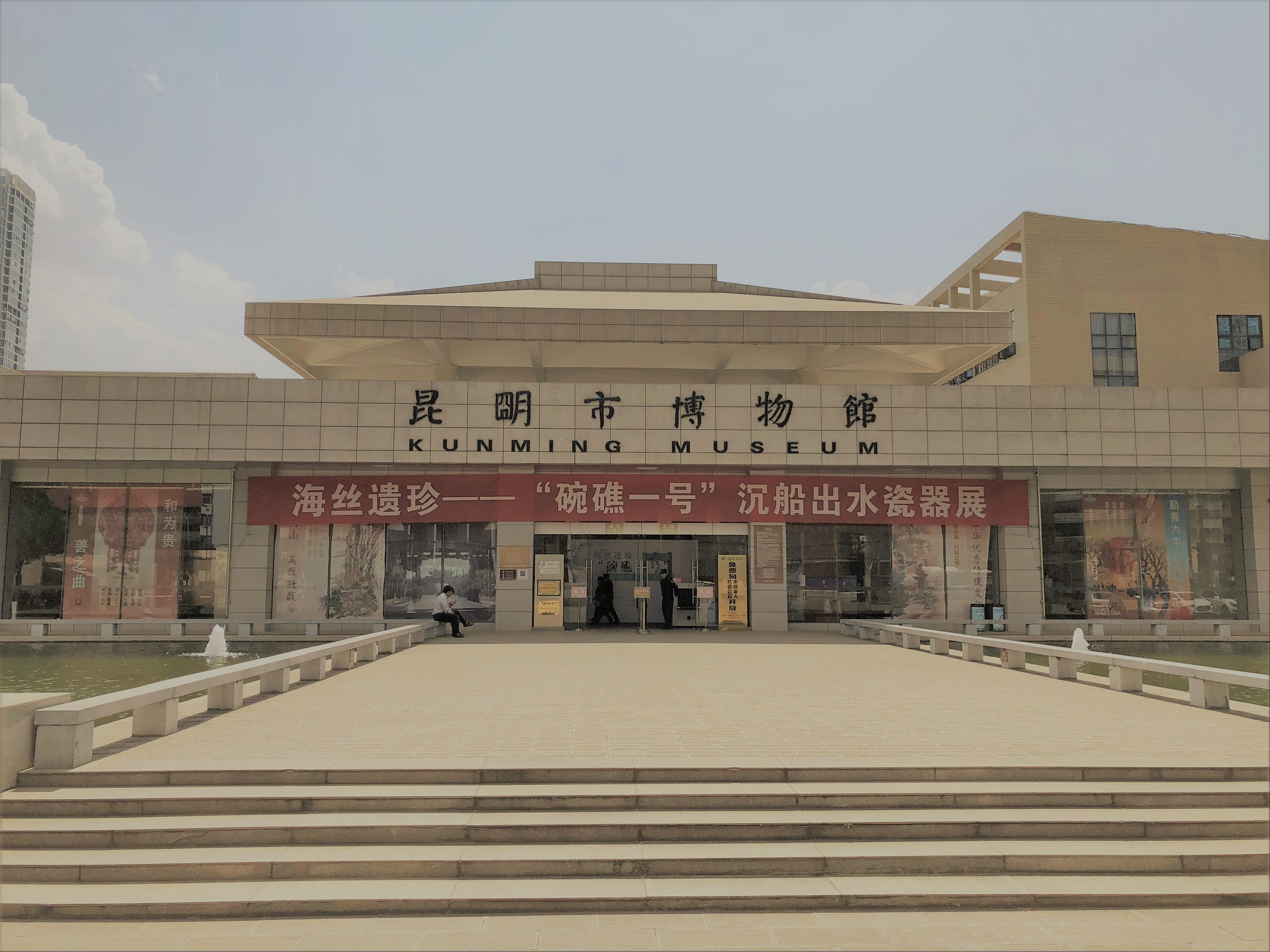
Kunming Museum.

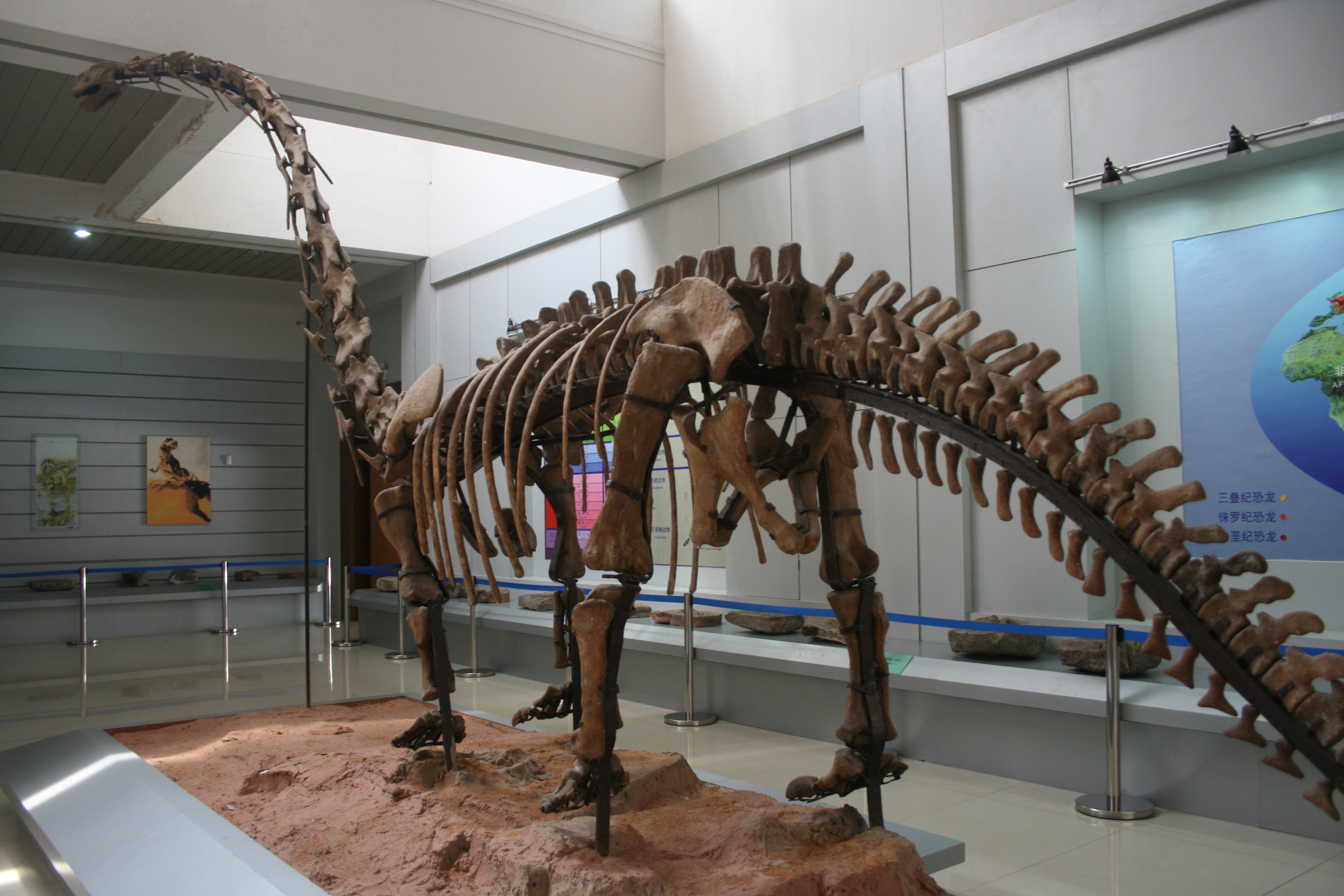
Reconstructed skeleton of Omeisaurus at Kunming Museum.

Kunming City Museum (Chinese: 昆明市博物馆) is a history museum in Kunming City, Yunnan, China. Smaller than the Yunnan Provincial Museum, its most notable exhibit is about the history of the city. Other features include a dinosaur exhibit and a rotating exhibition space that holds anything from history to art exhibitions.

There is also a scale model of the Kunming area documenting archeological sites relating to the illiterate Dian culture that dominated the area sometime around 400 BC – 100 AD.

== See also ==
- List of museums in China
