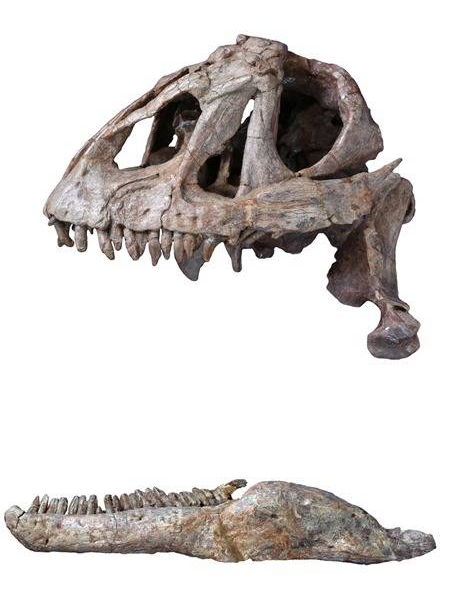
- Skull and jaw of the holotype

Scientific classification
- Kingdom: Animalia
- Phylum: Chordata
- Class: Reptilia
- Clade: Dinosauria
- Clade: Saurischia
- Clade: †Sauropodomorpha
- Clade: †Sauropodiformes
- Genus: †Yizhousaurus; Zhang et al., 2018

Type species
- †Yizhousaurus sunae Zhang et al., 2018

= Yizhousaurus =

Yizhousaurus Temporal range: Early Jurassic, Sinemurian

Extinct genus of dinosaurs

Yizhousaurus (meaning "Yizhou lizard", after the Chuxiong Yi Autonomous Region) is a genus of basal sauropodiform dinosaurs which existed in what is now Lufeng Formation, Yunnan Province of southern China during the lower Jurassic period. Identified from a nearly complete and exquisitely preserved skeleton, it is the most complete basal sauropod currently known with intact skull. Although its name was revealed in a 2010 Geological Society of America abstract by Sankar Chatterjee, T. Wang, S.G. Pan, Z. Dong, X.C. Wu, and Paul Upchurch, it wasn't validly named and described until 2018. The type species is Yizhousaurus sunae.

== Discovery and naming ==
Size comparison

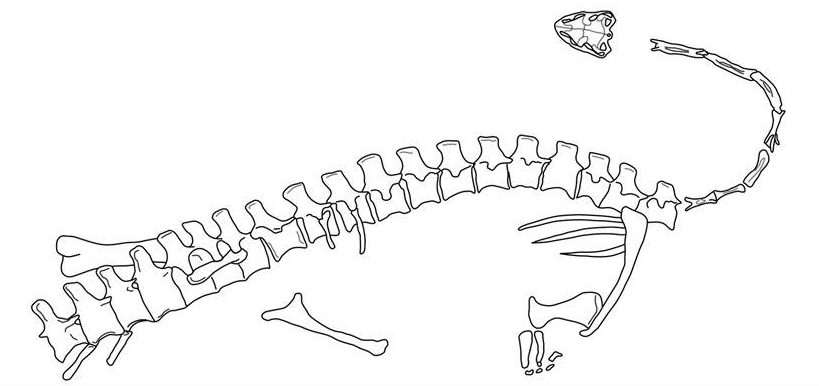
Holotype of Y. sunae

The holotype was discovered in 2002 and was excavated between October 20 through November 23. It consists of a near-complete skull and lower jaw, 31 vertebrae (nine cervical, fourteen dorsal, three sacral and five caudal), shoulder and pelvic girdles, most of both forelimbs and both thighs. The holotype was informally mentioned in a 2010 Geological Society of America abstract by Sankar Chatterjee, T. Wang, S.G. Pan, Z. Dong, X.C. Wu, and Paul Upchurch. It was eventually named and described in 2018.
