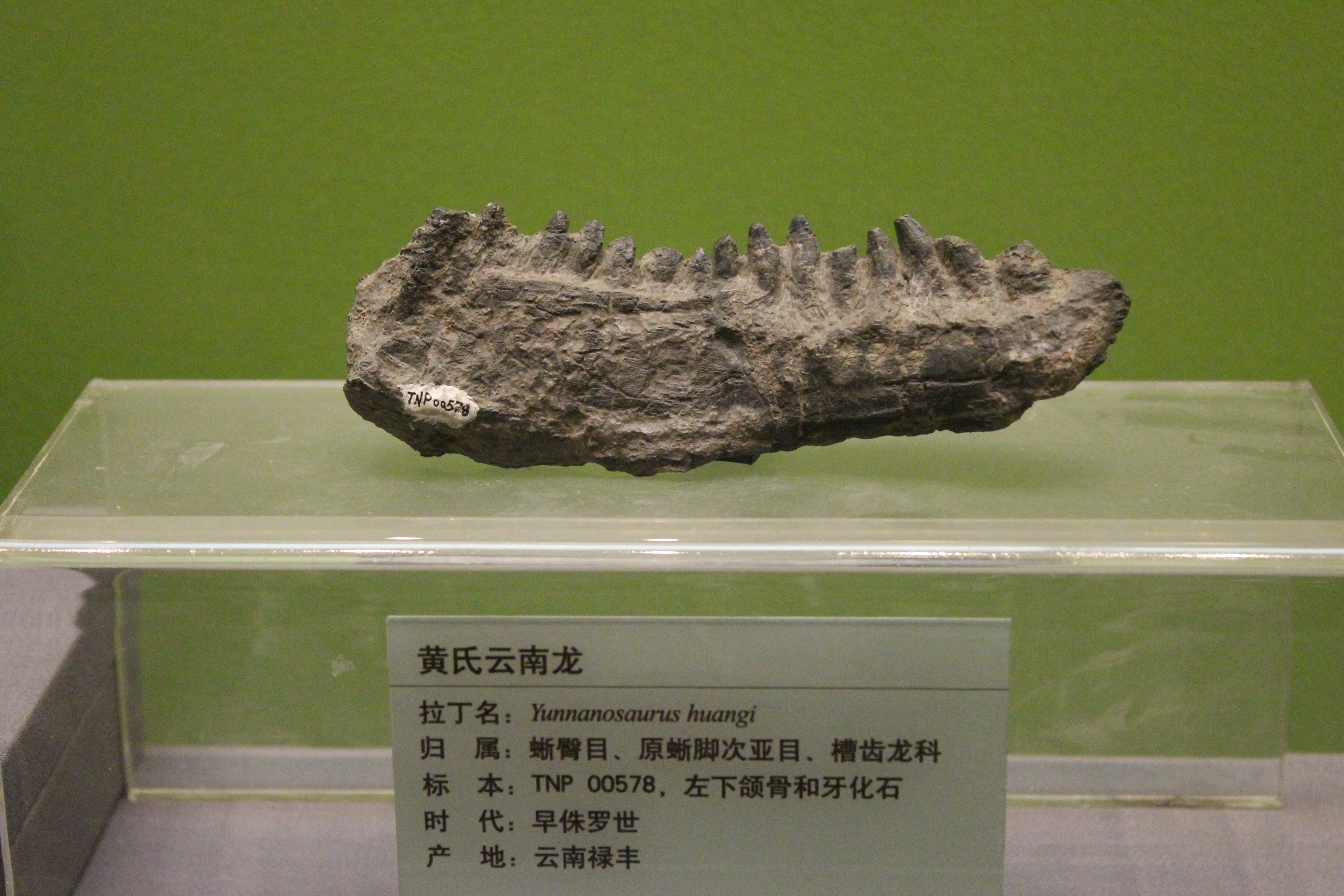
- Fossil jaw, Tianjin Natural History Museum

Scientific classification
- Kingdom: Animalia
- Phylum: Chordata
- Class: Reptilia
- Clade: Dinosauria
- Clade: Saurischia
- Clade: †Sauropodomorpha
- Clade: †Sauropodiformes
- Genus: †Yunnanosaurus; Young, 1942

Type species
- †Yunnanosaurus huangi Young, 1942

Other species
- †Y. youngi Lu et al., 2007; †Y. robustus? Young, 1951

= Yunnanosaurus =

Yunnanosaurus Temporal range: Sinemurian–Pliensbachian

Extinct genus of dinosaurs

Yunnanosaurus (/juːˌnænoʊˈsɔːrəs/ yoo-NAN-oh-SOR-əs) is an extinct genus of sauropodomorph dinosaur that lived approximately 199 to 183 million years ago in what is now the Yunnan Province, in China, for which it was named. Yunnanosaurus was a large sized, moderately-built, ground-dwelling, quadrupedal herbivore, that could also walk bipedally, and ranged in size from 7 meters (23 feet) long and 2 m (6.5 ft) high to 4 m (13 ft) high in the largest species.

== Discovery ==
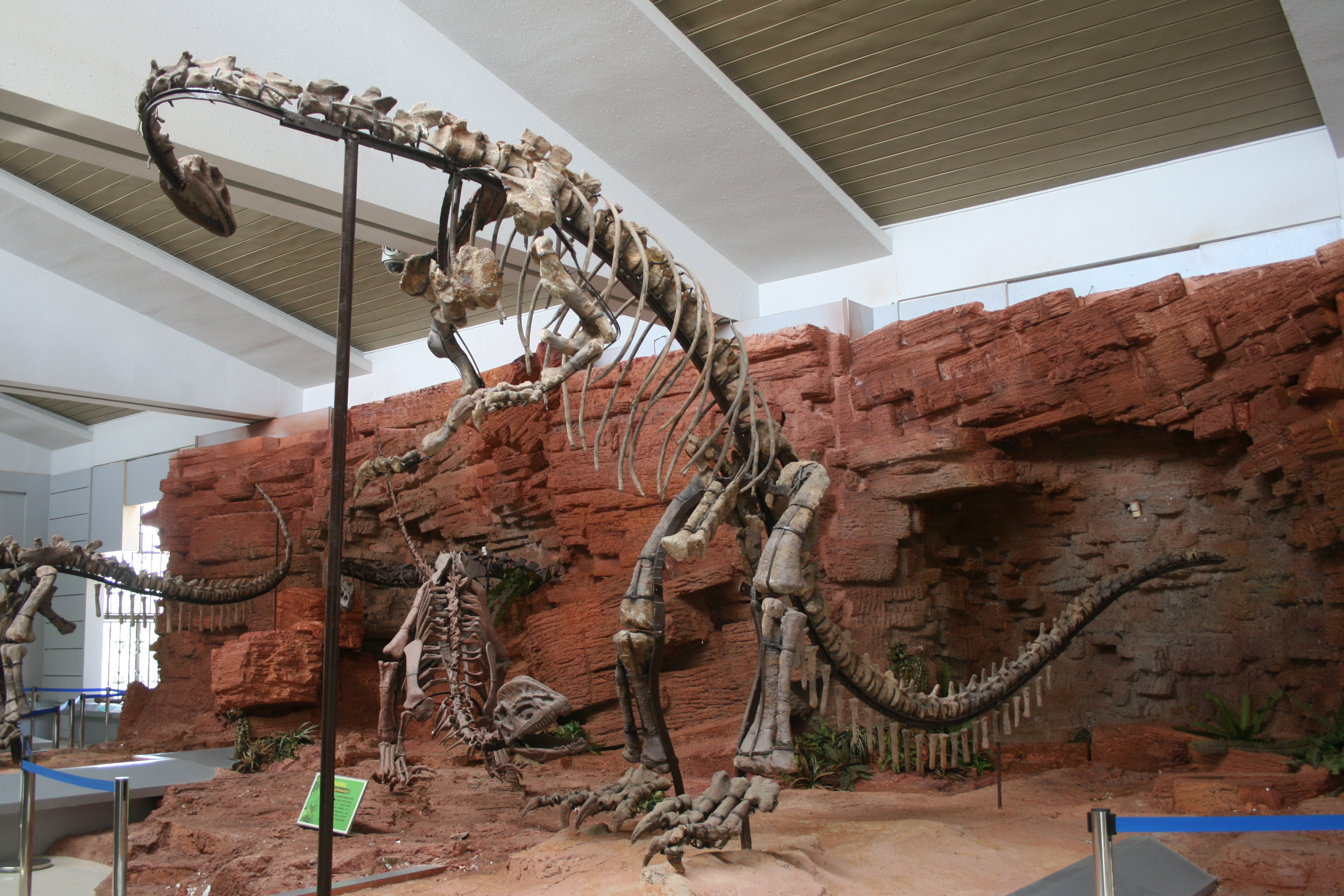
Reconstructed skeletons of Yunnanosaurus and Sinosaurus, Kunming City Museum

Yang Zhongjian (also known as C. C. Young) discovered the first Yunnanosaurus skeletons in the upper Zhangjiawa Member of the Lufeng Formation of Yunnan, China, dating to the Sinemurian stage of the Early Jurassic. The fossil find was composed of over twenty incomplete skeletons, including two skulls, it was excavated by Tsun Yi Wang. These remains were the basis for the species Y. huangi (the type species) and Y. robustus.

In 2007, Lü Junchang and colleagues described another species of Yunnanosaurus, Y. youngi (named in honor of C. C. Young). In addition to various skeletal differences, at 13 meters (42 ft) long Y. youngi was significantly larger than Y. huangi (which reached only 7 meters [23 ft]). The holotype specimen CXMVZA 185 consists of ten cervical vertebrae, fourteen dorsal vertebrae, three fused sacral vertebrae, seventeen caudal vertebrae, both pubic bones, both ischia, and the right ilium. The skull of this species is not known.

The type specimen of Yunnanosaurus youngi was recovered at the Banqing Houshanliangzi locality of the Fengjiahe Formation, previously thought to be from the Zhanghe Formation, in Yuanmou County of Yunnan Province, China. The holotype specimen CXMVZA 185 was collected in 2000 in terrestrial sediments deposited during the Pliensbachian stage of the Early Jurassic period, approximately 191 to 183 million years ago. This specimen is housed in the collection of the Chuxiong Museum.

In 2013, Sekiya et al. described the discovery of a juvenile individual which was assigned to Yunnanosaurus robustus. (Note: An unfused neural arch and long bone surface texture that is finely grooved, suggest that this individual is a juvenile.) Specimen ZMNH-M8739 consists of partial cranial material and an almost complete post-cranial skeleton. This individual possesses characteristic dentition that suggests a potentially unique feeding mechanism as evidenced a tooth–tooth wear facet on its mesial maxillary and dentary teeth, and maxillary teeth that have coarse serrations. Comparison of this juvenile specimen with adult specimens of Yunnanosaurus huangi reveals very distinctive growth changes.

== Description ==
Size of Y. huangi (light green) and Y. youngi (dark green)

=== Dentition ===
There were more than sixty spoon-shaped teeth in the jaws of Yunnanosaurus, and were unique among early sauropodomorphs in that its teeth were self-sharpening because they "[wore] against each other as the animal fed." Scientists consider these teeth to be advanced compared to other early sauropodomorphs, as they share features with the sauropods. However, scientists do not consider Yunnanosaurus to be especially close to the sauropods in phylogeny because the remaining portions of the animal's body are distinctly "prosauropod" in design. This critical difference implies that the similarity in dentition between Yunnanosaurus and sauropods might be an example of convergent evolution.

== Classification ==
- Plateosauria
  - Plateosauridae
    - Jaklapallisaurus
    - Plateosaurus engelhardti
    - Plateosaurus gracilis
    - Plateosaurus ingens
    - Unaysaurus
  - Massopoda
    - Riojasauridae
      - Eucnemesaurus
      - Riojasaurus
    - - Massospondylidae
        - Massospondylus
        - Pradhania
        - - Coloradisaurus
          - - Glacialisaurus
            - Lufengosaurus
      - Anchisauria
        - Anchisaurus
        - Jingshanosaurus
        - Yunnanosaurus
        - - Melanorosaurus
          - Sauropoda

The red bracket identifies members of the group "Prosauropoda".
Plateosauria cladogram based on the phylogenetic analysis, conducted by Novas et al., 2011.

The type species, Y. huangi, was named by C. C. Young in 1942, who erected the family Yunnanosauridae to contain it, though the family currently comprises only this genus and sometimes Jingshanosaurus. The specific name honours Huang Chiching ("T.K. Huang"), the director of the National Geological Survey of China. Young also named a second species, Y. robustus, in 1951, but this has since been included in the type species. The confusion in classification arose due to that the earliest specimens of Y. huangi were of juvenile individuals while the Y. robustus specimens represented fully grown adults. However, Sekiya et al. (2013) described a juvenile of Y. robustus and were able to differentiate it from Y. huangi. Yunnanosaurus had been assigned to several taxa over the years, including Thecodontosauridae and Plateosauridae, but a more recent phylogenetic analysis conducted by Novas et al. (2011) shows that this genus is part of the taxon Massopoda in a clade with Anchisaurus and Jingshanosaurus. Apaldetti et al. (2011) also found that Yunnanosaurus belonged in Massopoda, but found that this genus was more primitive than both Jingshanosaurus and Anchisaurus.

=== Distinguishing anatomical features ===
A diagnosis is a statement of the anatomical features of an organism (or group) that collectively distinguish it from all other organisms. Some, but not all, of the features in a diagnosis are also autapomorphies. An autapomorphy is a distinctive anatomical feature that is unique to a given organism.

==== Y. huangi ====
According to Barrett et al. (2007), the skull of Y. huangi can be distinguished from other sauropodomorphs based on the following characteristics:

- a small external naris
- a robust expanded nasal process of the premaxilla
- a downward projection from the rear of the maxillary ascending process
- no nutritive foramina on the lateral surface of maxilla
- a shallow circular depression on the lateral surface of the ventral lacrimal process
- a midline boss near the front of the frontals
- a prominent midline boss on the parietals
- the anterolateral process of the parietal is expanded relative to the width of the posterolateral process
- the maxillary teeth are narrow and do not have denticles

Additionally, Sekiya et al. (2013) add one more character distinguishing Y. huangi: a hemispherical neural spine in the posterior cervical vertebrae.

==== Y. youngi ====
According to Lu et al. (2007), Y. youngi can be distinguished from Y. huangi based on the following characteristics:

- the sixth cervical vertebra is the longest among the vertebral column
- the neural spines of the posterior cervical vertebrae are short with an expanded distal end, which is wider than its anteroposterior length
- three sacral vertebrae are tightly fused with a stout sacrocostal yoke
- the ventral margin of the postacetabular process of the ilium is slightly concave
- the ischium is longer than the pubis
- the distal end of the pubis is round

==== Y. robustus ====
According to Sekiya et al. (2013), Yunnanosaurus robustus can be distinguished from other sauropodomorphs based on the following characteristics:

- the absence of the anteroposterior expansion on the medial end of the astragalus
- the shaft of the metatarsal IV is dorsoventrally compressed

== Paleoecology ==
According to dental microwear texture analysis (DMTA), Yunnanosaurus fed on plant material that was much less tough and fibrous than the plants later sauropods like Omeisaurus, Camarasaurus, and Euhelopus fed on.

The type specimens of Yunnanosaurus huangi and Yunnanosaurus robustus were recovered in the Huangchiatien (Dahungtien) locality of the Lufeng Formation in Yunnan, China. The Y. huangi holotype specimen IVPP V20 and the Y. robustus holotype specimen IVPP V93, were collected by Chung Chien Young in terrestrial sediments from the upper dark/deep red beds of the Zhangjiawa Member of this formation, that are believed to have been deposited during the Sinemurian stage of the Jurassic period, approximately 199 to 190 million years ago. Several other specimens assigned to Y. huangi (IVPP V54, IVPP V47, IVPP V61, IVPP V62, IVPP V63, IVPP V96, IVPP V264), and Y. robustus (IVPP V39, IVPP V94) were also recovered by Young in this locality. These specimens are all housed in the collection of the Institute of Vertebrate Paleontology and Paleoanthropology, in Beijing, China. In the years to come several more specimens assigned to these two species were recovered from Zhangjiawa Member of this formation.

Chung Chien Young had also explored the lower dark/dull purple beds of the Shawan Member of the Lufeng Formation and found more specimens that he later assigned to Y. huangi. Specimen IVPP V32 was collected by Young in 1938 in dark red, argillaceous sandstone that is believed to have been deposited during the Hettangian stage of the Jurassic period, approximately 201 to 199 million years ago. Specimens IVPP V57, IVPP V60 and IVPP V272 were collected by Young in blue mudstone from the same formation and were also assigned to Y. huangi. These specimens from the Shawan Member are also housed in the collection of the Institute of Vertebrate Paleontology and Paleoanthropology.

Yunnanosaurus huangi and Yunnanosaurus robustus shared their paleoenvironment with the ornithischians Bienosaurus, and Tatisaurus, the sauropodomorphs Gyposaurus, Lufengosaurus, and Jingshanosaurus, and the theropods Sinosaurus triassicus and Eshanosaurus.
