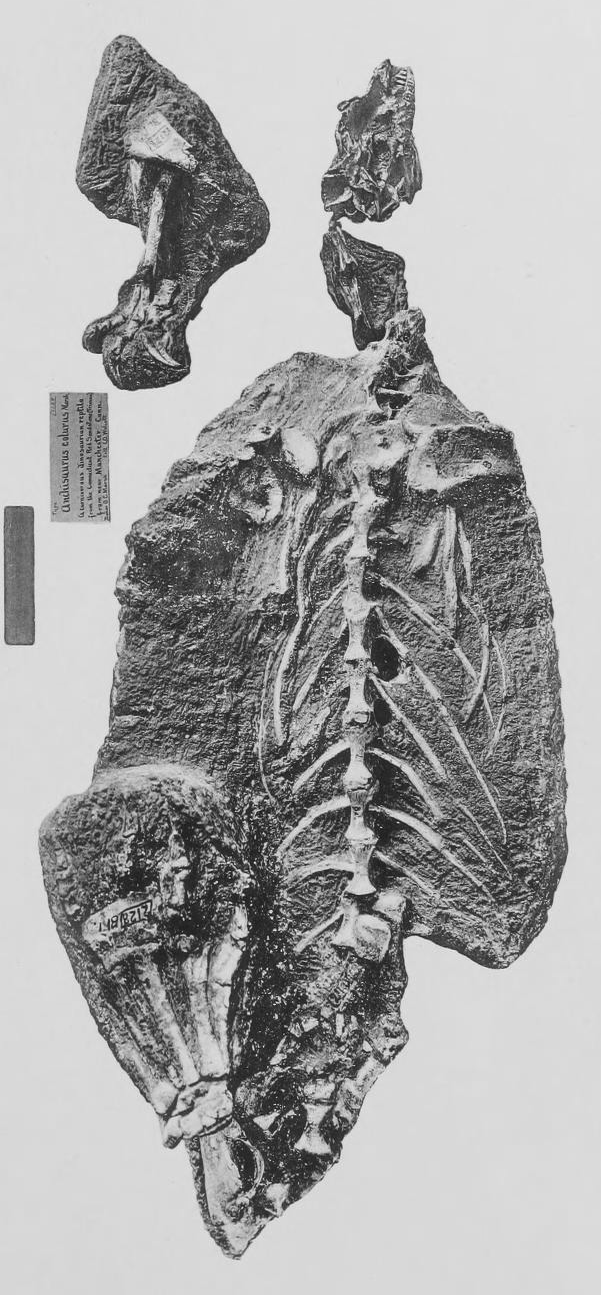
- Neotype skeleton of Anchisaurus YPM 1883/40313

Scientific classification
- Kingdom: Animalia
- Phylum: Chordata
- Class: Reptilia
- Clade: Dinosauria
- Clade: Saurischia
- Clade: †Sauropodomorpha
- Clade: †Sauropodiformes
- Clade: †Anchisauria
- Genus: †Anchisaurus; Marsh, 1885
- Species: †A. polyzelus

Binomial name
- †Anchisaurus polyzelus (Hitchcock, 1865)

Synonyms
- Megadactylus polyzelus Hitchcock, 1865 (preoccupied); Amphisaurus polyzelus (Hitchcock, 1865) (preoccupied); Anchisaurus major Marsh, 1889; Ammosaurus major (Marsh, 1889); Anchisaurus colurus Marsh, 1891; Yaleosaurus colurus (Marsh, 1891); Anchisaurus solus Marsh, 1892

= Anchisaurus =

Anchisaurus Temporal range: Early Jurassic, 200–195 Ma

Extinct genus of dinosaurs

Anchisaurus is a genus of basal sauropodomorph dinosaur. It lived during the Early Jurassic Period, and its fossils have been found in the red sandstone of the Upper Portland Formation, Northeastern United States, which was deposited from the Hettangian age into the Sinemurian age, between about 200 and 192 million years ago. Until recently it was classed as a member of Prosauropoda. The genus name Anchisaurus comes from the Greek αγχι (agkhi) anchi-; "near, close" + Greek σαυρος (sauros); "lizard". Anchisaurus was coined as a replacement name for "Amphisaurus", which was itself a replacement name for Hitchcock's "Megadactylus", both of which had already been used for other animals.

== Discovery and naming ==
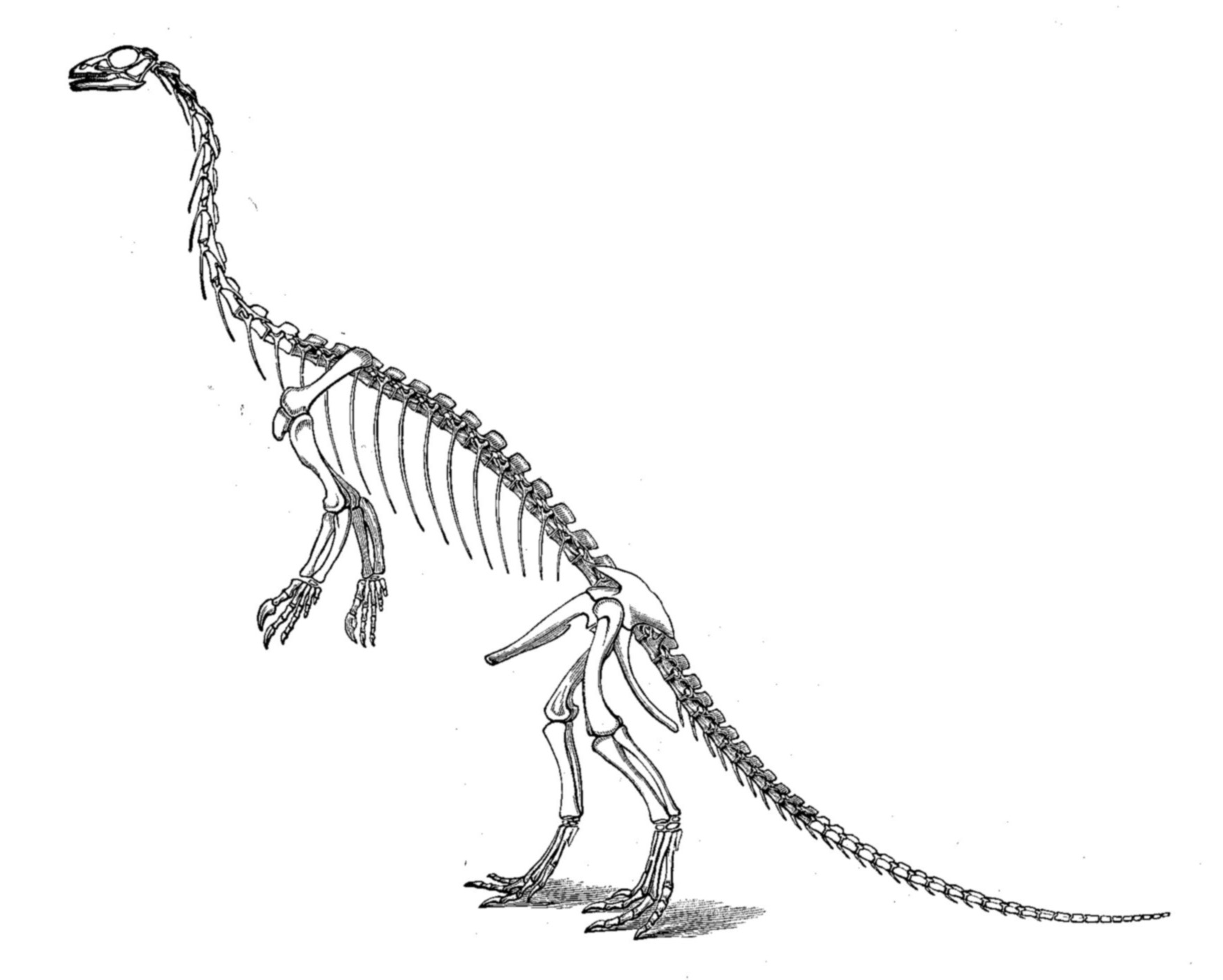
Anchisaurus skeleton restoration by O. C. Marsh.

Sauropodomorph remains were first documented in North America in 1818, when some bones nearly 1.8 m (6 ft) in length were uncovered by Mr. Solomon Ellsworth Jr. while excavating a well with gunpowder in East Windsor, Connecticut. At the time of their discovery it was thought that the bones might be those of a human, but the presence of tail vertebrae falsified that idea. They are now recognized as those of an indeterminate sauropodomorph, possibly more closely related to the plateosaurian prosauropods.

In 1855, the original type specimen of Anchisaurus polyzelus, AM 41/109, which is housed at the Amherst College Museum of Natural History, was found by William Smith in Springfield, Massachusetts during blasting a well for the waterhouse at the Springfield Armory. Unfortunately, both the East Windsor and Springfield specimens were severely damaged due to the blasting at the construction sites where they were found, and many of the bones were either accidentally thrown away by the workmen or kept by interested onlookers. As a result, these dinosaurs were only known from incomplete remains.

In 1863, the son of the ichnologist Edward Hitchcock, Edward Hitchcock Jr, described the Springfield remains in a supplement to his father's work on fossil footprints, suggesting they could explain a certain mysterious kind of reptile tracks. He then contacted the British paleontologist Richard Owen. Owen advised him to name the finds as a new genus. Owen suggested the name Megadactylus, "large finger" in Greek, in reference to the enormous thumb of the animal. Hitchcock Jr himself then chose the specific name polyzelus, "much sought for" in Greek, referring to the fact that his father had for many years vainly sought to discover the identity of the track-maker.

In 1877, Professor Othniel Charles Marsh had noted that the name Megadactylus had been preoccupied by Megadactylus Fitzinger 1843, a subgenus of the lizard genus Stellio. In 1882, he replaced the name with Amphisaurus, "near saurian", probably referring to Marsh's interpretation of it as intermediate between primitive dinosaurs—at the time the British Palaeosaurus was an example of what was thought to be a primitive dinosaur—and more derived dinosaurs. In 1885, Marsh had discovered that this name also had been preoccupied, by the anthracosaurian Amphisaurus Barkas 1870, and again replaced it by Anchisaurus, with the same meaning.

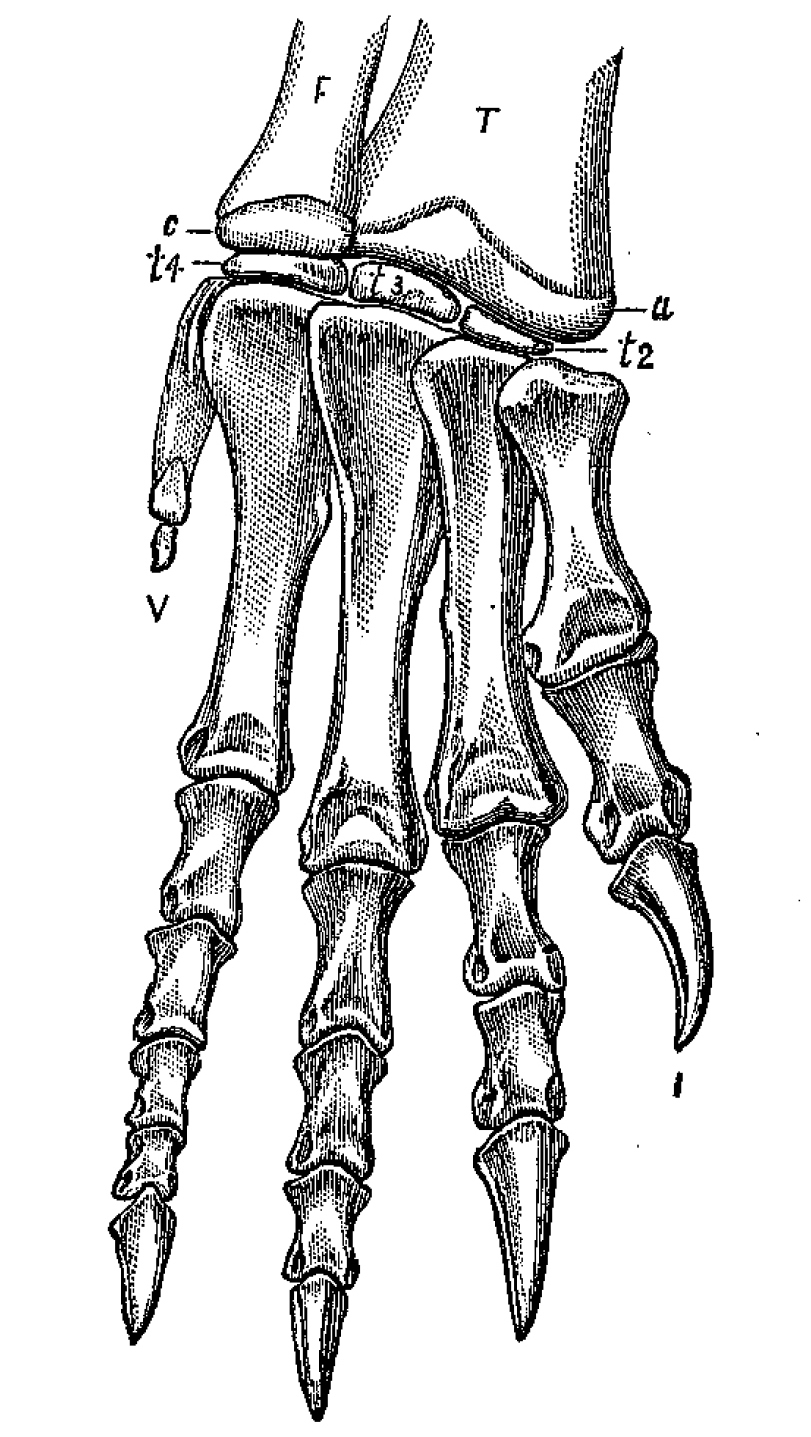
Right hind foot of Ammosaurus major, now known to have been a synonym of Anchisaurus polyzeus

Meanwhile, nearly complete specimens had been found in Manchester, Connecticut. In 1884, a series of bridges was built over the Hop Creek. Sandstone blocks were sawed out of Wolcott's Quarry north of Buckland Station. On 20 October, an amateur paleontologist, Charles H. Owen, observed that a block had been removed containing the hind part of a skeleton. He warned Marsh who, using T. A. Bostwick as an intermediary, acquired the piece from the quarry owner, Charles O. Wolcott. Marsh tried to secure the front half of the skeleton but it had already been used in a bridge abutment. The specimen, YPM 208, was named Anchisaurus major, "the larger one", by Marsh in 1889. Eventually, when the bridge was demolished in August 1969, John Ostrom would save the front block. Subsequently, two other dinosaur fossils were located in the quarry. Six metres south of the original find a second skeleton was visible in the quarry face. It was removed as a single block and given the inventory number YPM 1883. In Yale, the part containing the skull was split off and became specimen YPM 40313. In 1891, Marsh made Anchisaurus major a separate genus, Ammosaurus, the "sand saurian". In the same publication he named YPM 1883/YPM 40313 as a new species of Anchisaurus, Anchisaurus colurus, "the mangled one". They served as the templates from which O. C. Marsh in 1893 restored the skeleton. The Manchester specimens are now considered conspecific with Anchisaurus polyzelus. The East Windsor and Manchester specimens are housed at the Peabody Museum of Natural History at Yale University.

The type species is Hitchcock's A. polyzelus. Marsh's A. major (also known as Ammosaurus), A. solus, and A. colurus (also known as Yaleosaurus), have since been recognized as synonyms of A. polyzelus, their supposed differences being due to misinterpretation and different stages of growth. In 2015, the ICZN formally made the more complete type specimen of A. colurus the neotype of the genus Anchisaurus and the species A. polyzelus, rendering A. polyzelus and A. colurus objective synonyms (both names being based on exactly the same fossil).

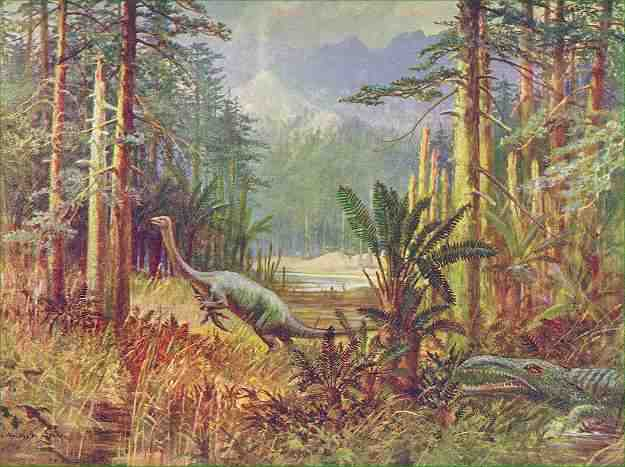
Restoration by Lancelot Speed from 1905

Broom named Gyposaurus capensis in 1911, from bones discovered in South Africa but Peter Galton renamed these Anchisaurus capensis in 1976. This species has since been reclassified again and is probably a juvenile of Massospondylus carinatus. G. sinensis was also referred here, but appears to be a distinct animal.

The Navajo Sandstone of Arizona is the same age as the Portland Formation, and has produced prosauropod remains that have been referred to as Ammosaurus. However, it is possible that these actually belong to the genus Massospondylus, otherwise known only from South Africa.

In the eastern Canadian province of Nova Scotia, scientists have unearthed prosauropods from the McCoy Brook Formation, which is about 200 to 197 million years old, from the Early Jurassic Hettangian stage. The Nova Scotia material provides clues about the diet of these animals. A large number of gastroliths, stones swallowed to grind up plant material in the gut, were found in the abdomen, as well as bone from the skull of a small sphenodont, Clevosaurus. This indicates that these dinosaurs were omnivorous, with a diet mainly consisting of plants but with an occasional supplement of meat. However, these remains have never been fully described or illustrated and were only tentatively referred to Ammosaurus. A further study identified them as a new taxon of sauropodomorph, Fendusaurus eldoni.

== Description ==
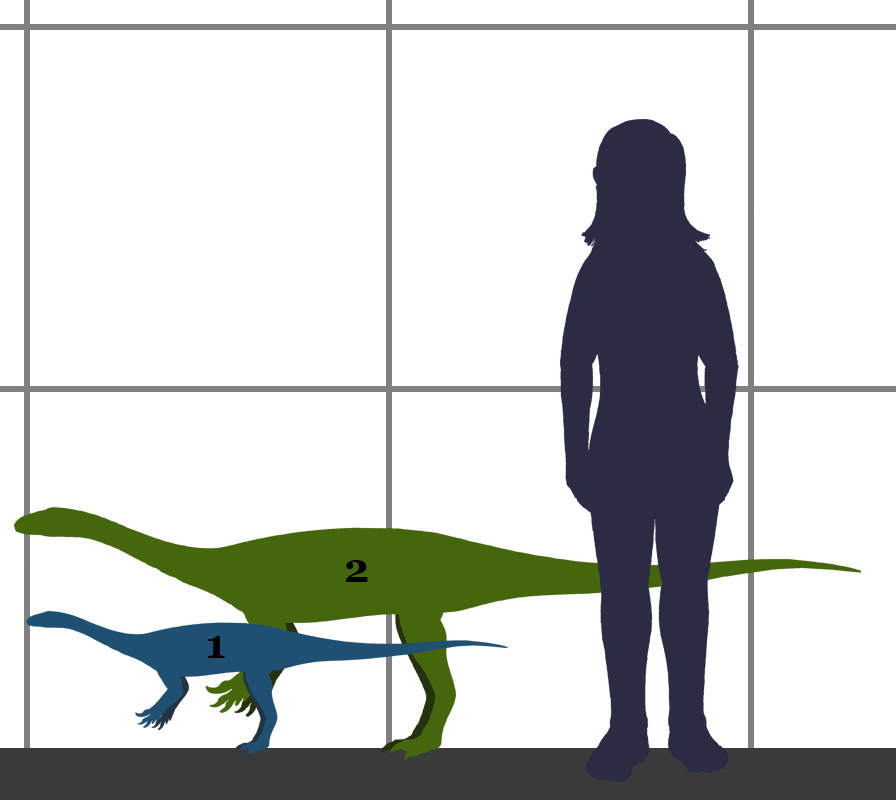
Size of Anchisaurus (1 assigned specimen, 2 adult specimen), compared to a human.

Anchisaurus was a rather small dinosaur, with a length of just over 2 meters (6.6 ft), which helps explain why it was once mistaken for human bones. It probably weighed around 27 kilograms (60 lb). However, Marsh's species A. major (also known as Ammosaurus) was larger, from 2.5 to 4 meters (8 ft 2 in to 13 ft 1 in) and some estimates give it a weight of up to 32 kilograms (70 lb). Gregory S. Paul estimated its length at 2.2 meters (7.2 ft) and its weight at 20 kilograms (44 lb) in 2010.

According to the presence of cf. Otozoum tracks on the Connecticut Valley, Anchisaurus could reach even greater sizes. Otozoum tracks were made by a semibipedal to quadrupedal sauropodomorph close to or on the line leading toward eusauropods. Anchisaurus is one of the two sauropodomorphs recognized in the zone. Based on the four known specimens of Anchisaurus, Yates estimated that the animal measured up to 4.9 meters (16 ft) in length. This matches well with the estimated average size of the adult Eubrontes track-maker in the Hartford and Deerfield basins. Based on the largest known Eubrontes footprint, exceptionally large individuals of Anchisaurus probably measured up to 6 meters (20 ft) in length.

== Classification ==
Life restoration

Due to its primitive appearance, Anchisaurus was previously classified as a prosauropod, a member of a group of animals related to or ancestral to the sauropods. Recent investigations show that a group of traditional prosauropods form a monophyletic sister-group to Sauropoda, and that Anchisaurus is instead closer to sauropods.

The family Anchisauridae was first proposed by Othniel Charles Marsh in 1885 and later defined as a clade consisting of Anchisaurus and its nearest relatives. However, it is not clear which other genera are included in the family; many of the dinosaurs once included have since been moved elsewhere, and the group is not used in most current taxonomies.

== Paleobiology ==
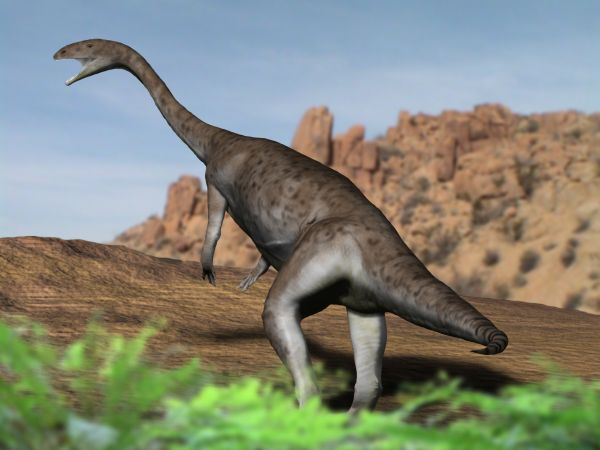
Restoration showing environment

Fossils of Anchisaurus were originally discovered in the Portland Formation of the Newark Supergroup in the Connecticut River Valley. This formation preserves an arid environment with strong wet and dry seasons, from the Hettangian age into the Sinemurian age, between about 200 and 195 million years ago.

Digesting plant matter is a much more intensive biochemical process than digesting meat. This herbivore swallowed gastroliths (gizzard stones) to help break down the food in its stomach. Herbivorous dinosaurs needed a huge gut. Since this had to be positioned in front of the pelvis, balancing on two legs became increasingly difficult, as dinosaurs became larger and they gradually evolved into the quadrupedal position that characterizes the later sauropods such as Diplodocus. Prosauropods represented a middle phase between the earliest bipedal herbivores and the later giant sauropods. As a prosauropod, Anchisaurus was mostly typical of this group, which flourished briefly during the late Triassic and early Jurassic. Anchisaurus teeth, used to rip food, were shaped like spoons. It had fewer and more widely spaced teeth than true prosauropods, and as Peter Galton and Michael Cluver observed, narrower feet. Anchisaurus would have spent most of its time on four legs but could have reared up on its hind legs to reach higher plants.

As a facultative biped, Anchisaurus had to have multi-purpose front legs. As 'hands', they could be turned inwards and be used for grasping. It had a simple reversible first 'finger', similar to a 'thumb'. As feet, the five toes could be placed flat against the floor and were strong at the ankle. This unspecialized design is typical of the early dinosaurs.

Notably, multiple specimens of Anchisaurus are preserved as partially articulated skeletons, despite these specimens being preserved in a high-energy riverine environment that would have disarticulated the bones. It has thus been speculated that Anchisaurus may have had a burrowing lifestyle, which would have allowed the animals to be entombed within their burrows, leading to minimal disarticulation of their bones. Further support for this lifestyle comes from the close similarity between the size and proportions of Anchisaurus to those of the confirmed burrowing dinosaur Oryctodromeus.
