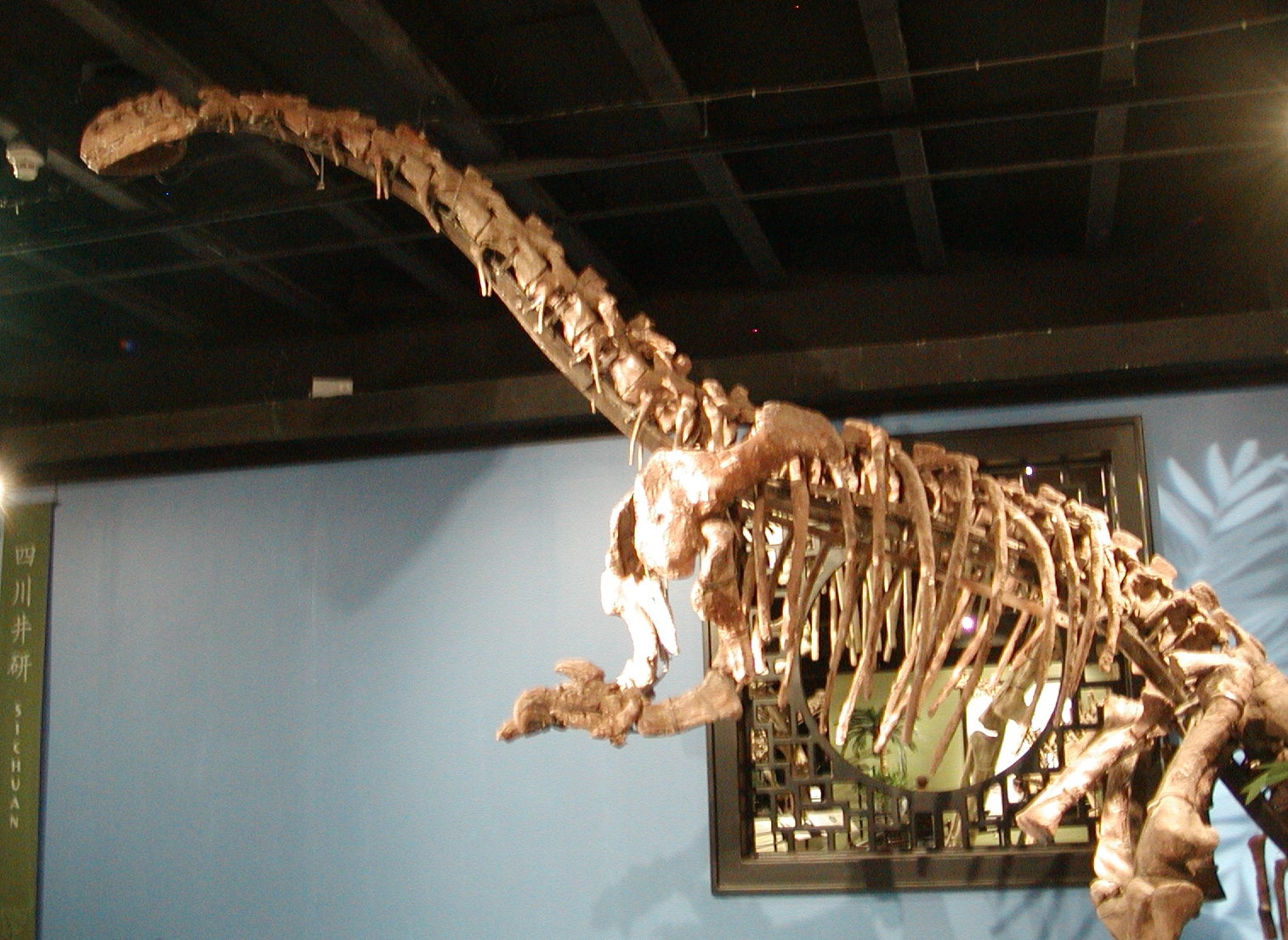
- Skeleton of Jingshanosaurus xinwaensis at the Miami Science Museum.

Scientific classification
- Kingdom: Animalia
- Phylum: Chordata
- Class: Reptilia
- Clade: Dinosauria
- Clade: Saurischia
- Clade: †Sauropodomorpha
- Clade: †Sauropodiformes
- Genus: †Jingshanosaurus; Zhang and Yang, 1995

Type species
- †Jingshanosaurus xinwaensis Zhang and Yang, 1995

= Jingshanosaurus =

Jingshanosaurus Temporal range: Early Jurassic 201.4–196.5 Ma

Extinct genus of dinosaurs

Jingshanosaurus (meaning "Jingshan lizard") is a genus of sauropodomorph dinosaurs from the early Jurassic period (201.4 to 196.5 million years ago, Hettangian age) of China. The type and only species is Jingshanosaurus xinwaensis. Its maximum weight was around 4.3 t (4.7 short tons) with an adult femur length of 845 mm (33.3 in). The genus grew up to 5 m (16 ft) long.

== History of discovery ==
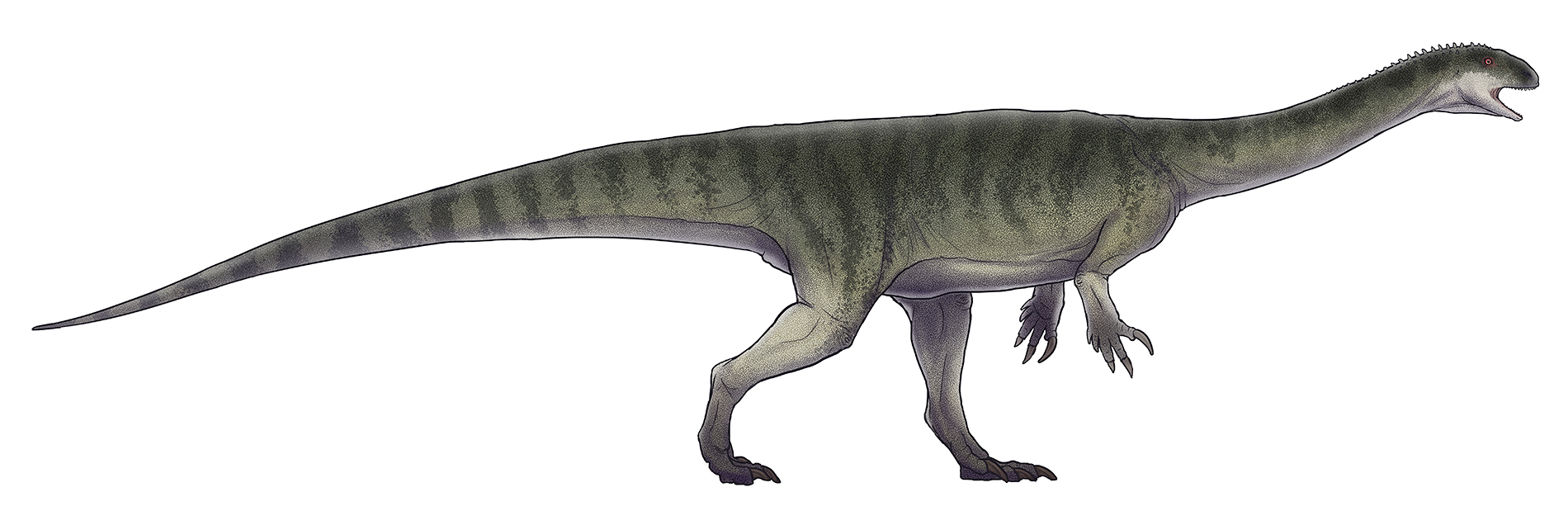
Life restoration.

Its fossils, a nearly complete skeleton including the skull, were found near the town of Jingshan ("Golden Hill"), Lufeng County, Yunnan Province, China, from which the name derives. First described in 1995, the type species is J. xinwaensis, formalized by Zhang and Yang. Fossil remains of Jingshanosaurus had been exhibited in museums several years prior to the formal naming. A complete skeleton and skull of Jingshanosaurus xinwaensis have been found and is considered the last prosauropods to live on earth.

== Classification ==
Jingshanosaurus may have been most closely related to Yunnanosaurus, and has, at times, been included in the Yunnanosauridae. In fact, Dong Zhiming considered Jingshanosaurus possibly a large specimen of Yunnanosaurus. If true, this would make Jingshanosaurus a junior synonym of Yunnanosaurus.
