= Volkheimeria =

Volkheimeria Temporal range: Early Jurassic (middle Toarcian), ~179.17–178.07 Ma

Scientific classification
- Kingdom: Animalia
- Phylum: Chordata
- Class: Reptilia
- Clade: Dinosauria
- Clade: Saurischia
- Clade: †Sauropodomorpha
- Clade: †Sauropoda
- Genus: †Volkheimeria; Bonaparte, 1979
- Species: †V. chubutensis

Binomial name
- †Volkheimeria chubutensis Bonaparte, 1979

Extinct genus of dinosaurs

Volkheimeria is an extinct genus of sauropod dinosaurs that lived in what is now Argentina during the Early Jurassic, about 179–178 million years ago. Its type and only species is Volkheimeria chubutensis.

== Discovery and naming ==
The only known specimen of Volkheimeria was discovered at the site of Cerro Cóndor Sur, roughly a kilometer west of the village of Cerro Cóndor in Chubut Province, Argentina. In 1979, José Bonaparte described it as representing a new genus and species, Volkheimeria chubutensis, alongside two other species discovered in the same strata, Piatnitzkysaurus floresi and Patagosaurus fariasi. The genus name Volkheimeria honors the Argentinean paleontologist Wolfgang Volkheimer.

== Fossil record ==
Only a single specimen of Volkheimeria chubutensis is known: the holotype PVL 4077, a partial skeleton from the Cañadón Asfalto Formation of Argentina. This specimen consists of a partial cervical vertebra, two complete and two partial dorsal vertebrae, part of the sacrum, several incomplete caudal vertebrae, partial ilia, a pubis, an ischium, a femur, and a tibia. The specimen was not fully grown, but had probably reached sexual maturity. An isolated tooth found in the Cañadón Asfalto Formation, MPEF-PV 10860, may belong to Volkheimeria, though this cannot be proven without more complete specimens.

== Description ==
The size of a fully-grown Volkheimeria is not known, as it is only known from an immature specimen. A tooth that may belong to Volkheimeria is broad and spoon-shaped, with large denticles present on the upper two-thirds of the tooth crown. Pleurocoels, excavations in the side of the vertebrae for air sacs, were present in the cervical vertebrae but not the dorsal vertebrae. The neural arches of the dorsal vertebrae are proportionally short and the neural spines are mediolaterally compressed and have mostly flat lateral surfaces, in both respects differing from more derived sauropods. The caudal vertebrae are short from front to back, implying the tail as a whole was relatively short as well. The tibia is fairly short relative to the femur, at only 58% of its length.

== Classification ==
Volkheimeria was originally identified as a primitive sauropod, distinguishable from Patagosaurus. Some phylogenetic analyses of the taxon have recovered it as a eusauropod, vulcanodontid, or primitive sauropod, though its position is variable due to its incomplete nature. The phylogenetic analysis of Pol and colleagues in 2022 recovered Volkheimeria as a non-eusauropod based on primitive features of the vertebrae, though alternative placements were identified as closer to either Amygdalodon or Archaeodontosaurus, as shown below.

- Sauropoda
  - Melanorosaurus
  - Sefapanosaurus
  - Leonerasaurus
  - Aardonyx
  - - Lessemsauridae
      - Lessemsaurus
      - Antetonitrus
      - - Ledumahadi
        - Ingentia
  - - Gongxianosaurus
    - - Amygdalodon
      - Volkheimeria
    - - Pulanesaura
      - - Isanosaurus
        - Gravisauria
          - - Sanpasaurus
            - - Tazoudasaurus
              - Vulcanodon
          - - Volkheimeria
            - - - Archaeodontosaurus
                - Volkheimeria
              - - Volkheimeria
                - Eusauropoda

=== Classification history ===
Bonaparte initially regarded Volkheimeria as a primitive member of Cetiosauridae. He considered both it and Lapparentosaurus to represent an early stage in cetiosaurid evolution, more advanced than Vulcanodon but more primitive than Patagosaurus and Cetiosaurus. In 1990, John S. McIntosh included both Volkheimeria and Lapparentosaurus in Brachiosauridae, albeit without providing anatomical evidence for classifying Volkheimeria as such. In 2004, Upchurch et al. regarded the affinities of Volkheimeria as uncertain, due to the lack of a phylogenetic analysis including the taxon. In 2011, Pol et al. included both Volkheimeria and Lapparentosaurus in a phylogenetic analysis, and recovered them as basal eusauropods, more derived than Shunosaurus but more basal than Barapasaurus, with Volkheimeria more basal than Lapparentosaurus. In 2017, Cerda et al. found Volkheimeria to be a non-eusauropod sauropod closely related to Tazoudasaurus. In 2018, Holwerda and Pol found Volkheimeria to be a non-eusauropod sauropod, as the sister taxon of Spinophorosaurus. In 2025, Gomez and colleagues found Volkheimeria to be a basal sauropod more closely related to eusauropods than Amygdalodon or Gongxianosaurus but not as closely related to eusauropods as Vulcanodon and Tazoudasaurus.

== Evolution ==
Volkheimeria lived during the Toarcian age of the Early Jurassic, 178-179 million years ago. The beginning of the Toarcian was a time of significant faunal turnover for sauropodomorphs, as all sauropodomorph lineages except for sauropods died out and eusauropods, which became the dominant sauropod group in the Middle Jurassic, began to diversify. Volkheimeria was not a member of the eusauropod radiation, and was probably a representative of a lineage that diverged from other sauropods in the earliest Jurassic or even the Triassic.

== Paleoecology ==
The ecosystem represented by the Cañadón Asfalto Formation included at least four sauropods other than Volkheimeria chubutensis, all of them eusauropods: Bagualia alba, Patagosaurus fariasi, an unnamed basal eusauropod, and a possible neosauropod.
