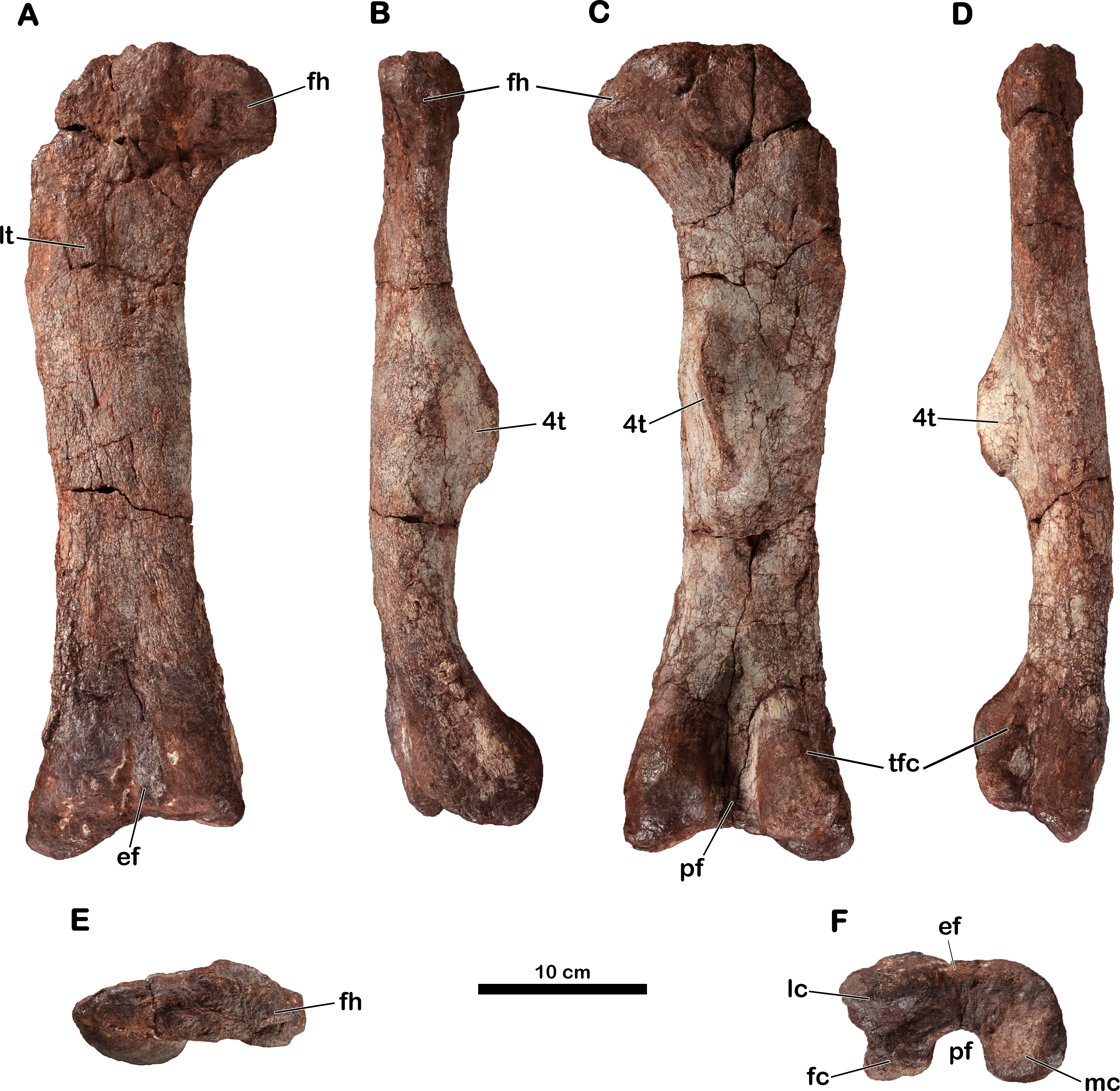
- Right femur

Scientific classification
- Kingdom: Animalia
- Phylum: Chordata
- Class: Reptilia
- Clade: Dinosauria
- Clade: Saurischia
- Clade: †Sauropodomorpha
- Clade: †Anchisauria
- Genus: †Meroktenos; Peyre de Fabrègues & Allain, 2016

Type species
- †Meroktenos thabanensis (Gauffre, 1993)

Synonyms
- Melanorosaurus thabanensis Gauffre, 1993

= Meroktenos =

Meroktenos Temporal range: Late Triassic, 216.5–201 Ma

Extinct genus of dinosaur from Triassic southern Africa

Meroktenos is a genus of basal sauropodomorph dinosaur that lived during the Late Triassic period of what is now Lesotho.

== Discovery and naming ==
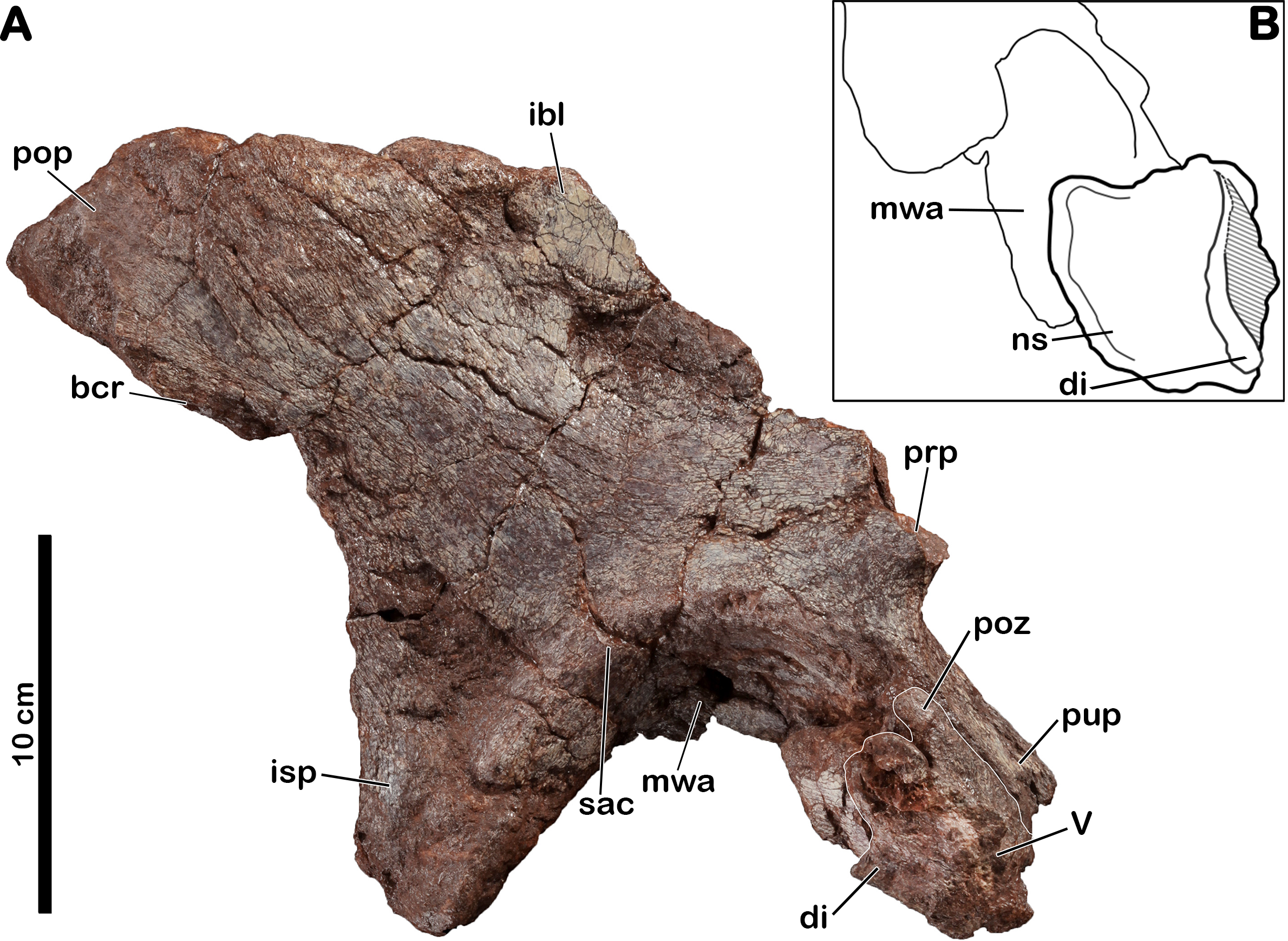
Ilium

In 1959, François Ellenberger, Paul Ellenberger, Jean Fabre and Leonard Ginsburg discovered the type specimen, a thighbone or femur and other assorted bones, south of the village of Thabana Morena. In 1962 these were addressed in a thesis by D. Costedoat. The exact location the bones were recovered, is today unknown.

In 1993, François-Xavier Gauffre assigned the remains to a second species of Melanorosaurus: Melanorosaurus thabanensis. The description was provisional, and in 1997 the fossil was described in more detail in a publication by Jacques van Heerden and Peter Malcolm Galton. The specific name refers to the site Thabana-Morena in Lesotho.

Gauffre assumed that the specimen had been found in the Upper Elliot Formation dating from the Hettangian-Sinemurian and thus was about twenty million year younger than Melanorosaurus readi. In 1996, he revised the date to the Lower Elliot Formation of the late Triassic in his non-published dissertation. He also referred the thighbone to a new genus and species Thotobolosaurus (now Kholumolumo). This remained a non-valid nomen ex dissertatione, as the name would never be published; furthermore the type material of this species does not coincide with that of M. thabanensis.

In 2016, M. thabanensis was appointed to the separate genus Meroktenos by Claire Peyre de Fabrègues and Ronan Allain. The genus name is a combination of ancient Greek μηρός, meros ("thigh") and κτῆνος, ktènos ("beast"). The combinatio nova thus becomes Meroktenos thabanensis, the type species is the original Melanorosaurus thabanensis.

The holotype, MNHN.F.LES 16, consists of a right thighbone (MNHN.F.LES16c), a portion of the right ilium, with a piece of a vertebral neural arch (MNHN.F.LES16a); a left pubic bone (MNHN.F.LES16b); and a second right metatarsal (MNHN.F.LES16d) associated with the skeleton. In 2016, a new specimen, MNHN.F.LES351, was referred to the species; consisting of a cervical vertebra, a left ulna and a, probably left, radius. It might have belonged to the same individual as the holotype, but this cannot be strictly proven.

== Description ==
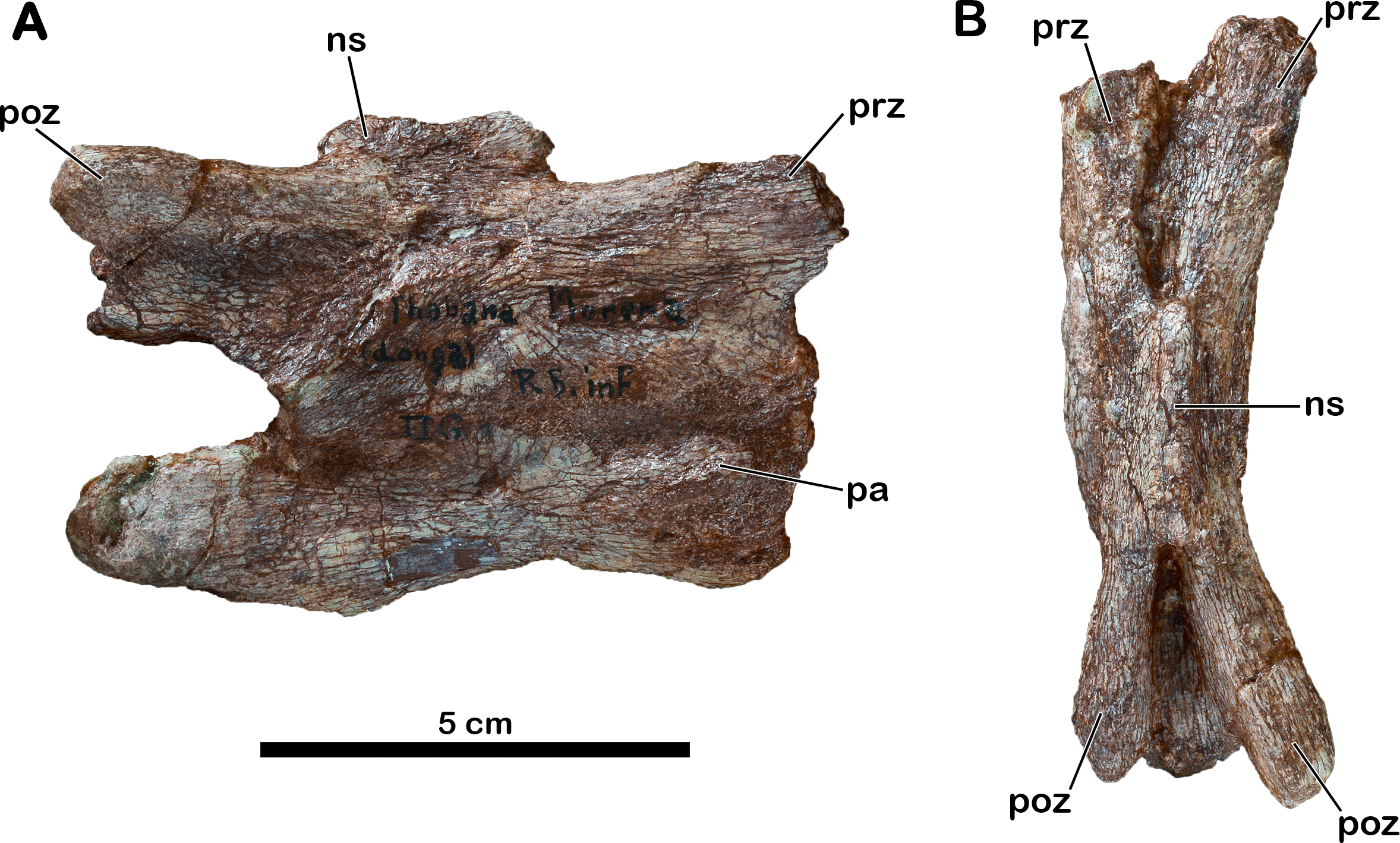
Caudal vertebra

Meroktenos has a femur length of around forty-eight centimeters, suggesting a body length of about four meters.

In 2016, a revised list of distinguishing traits was given. The blade height of the ilium, measured from the highest point of the antitrochanter to the upper edge of the blade is 60% of the total height of the ilium, including peduncles. The rear blade of the ilium is roughly triangular in side view. The femur is very compact with a robusticity index, length divided by the circumference of the shaft, of 2.09. The femur has a straight shaft in both side and front views. The femoral shaft is substantially wider transversely than it is wide in side view, with a ratio of 1.58. On the rear of the femoral shaft, the fourth trochanter is oriented obliquely, running from the upper and inner side to the lower and outer side.

== Phylogeny ==
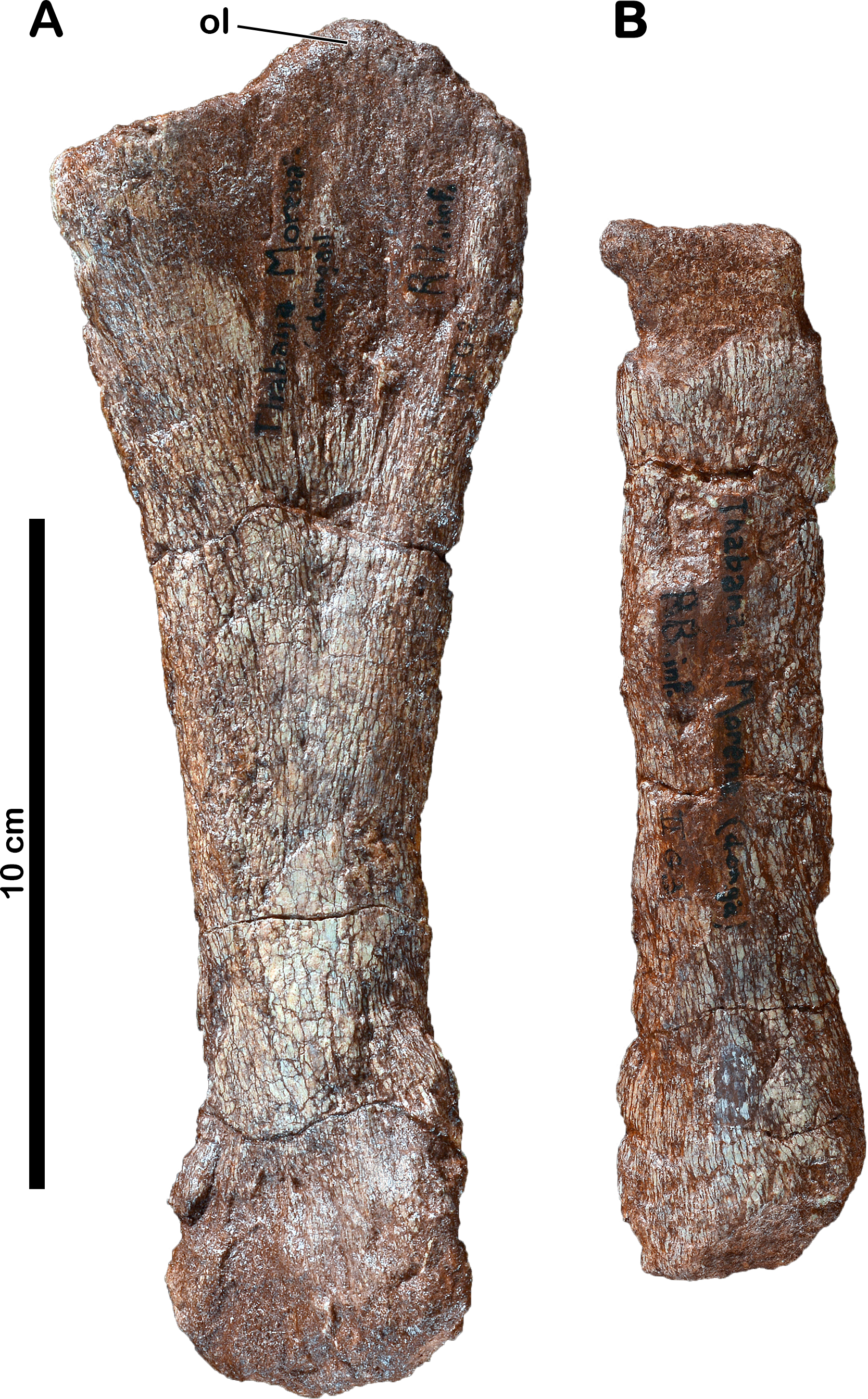
Ulna and radius bones of the lower arm

In 2016, Meroktenos was placed in the Sauropodomorpha, in a basal position. According to a cladistic analysis, Meroktenos formed a polytomy with Blikanasaurus and more derived taxa, above Aardonyx in the evolutionary tree and below a polytomy including Camelotia, Melanorosaurus and more derived groups:

- Massopoda
  - Seitaad
  - - Sarahsaurus
    - - Coloradisaurus
      - - - Massospondylus
          - - Adeopapposaurus
            - Leyesaurus
        - - - Glacialisaurus
            - Lufengosaurus
          - - Yunnanosaurus
            - - Jingshanosaurus
              - - Anchisaurus
                - - Aardonyx
                  - - Blikanasaurus
                    - Meroktenos
                    - - Camelotia
                      - Melanorosaurus
                      - - - Antetonitrus
                          - Lessemsaurus
                        - Sauropoda

A 2021 study by Pol and colleagues found Meroktenos to be a member of Lessemsauridae, being the sister taxon of a clade formed by Kholumolumo and Ledumahadi:

- Sauropodiformes
  - Aardonyx
  - - Leonerasaurus
    - Mussaurus
  - Yizhousaurus
  - - NMQR1551
    - NMQR3314
    - Sauropoda (sensu Yates (2007))
      - - Camelotia
        - Lessemsauridae
          - - Lessemsaurus
            - - Antetonitrus
              - Ingentia
          - - Meroktenos
            - - Kholumolumo
              - Ledumahadi
      - - Gongxianosaurus
        - Pulanesaura
        - - Schleitheimia
          - - Isanosaurus
            - Sauropoda (sensu Salgado et al. (1997))
              - - Tazoudasaurus
                - Vulcanodon
              - Eusauropoda

== Palaeobiology ==
The relative transverse width of the femur, the eccentricity, is remarkably high for such a small animal. These proportions were known previously only from Sauropoda and explained as an adaptation to a very high absolute weight. Because the holotype probably was not a young animal and is unlikely to have attained giant proportions, the trait must have had a different function.

== See also ==
- 2016 in paleontology
