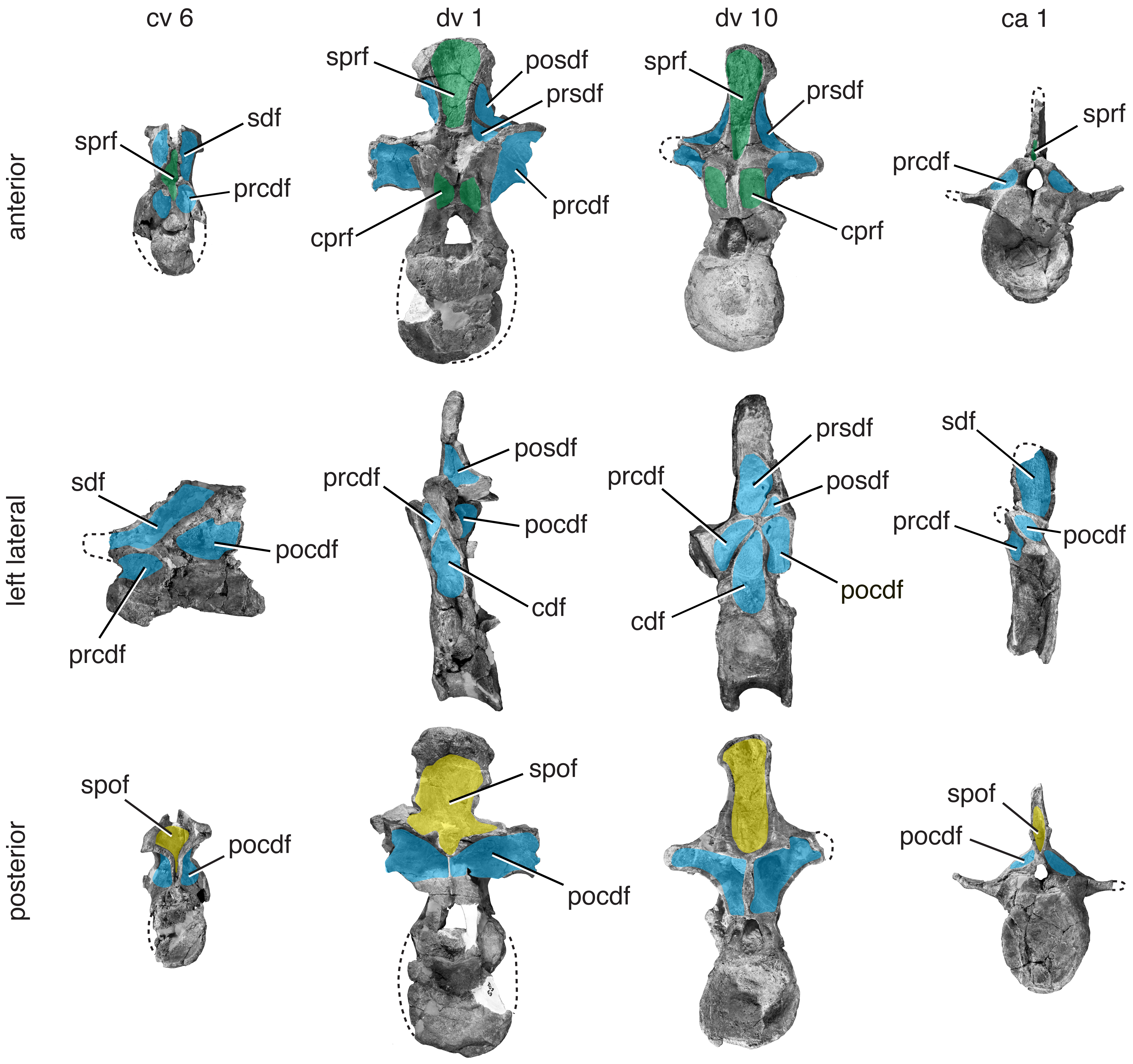
- Representative vertebrae of Tazoudasaurus naimi

Scientific classification
- Kingdom: Animalia
- Phylum: Chordata
- Class: Reptilia
- Clade: Dinosauria
- Clade: Saurischia
- Clade: †Sauropodomorpha
- Clade: †Sauropoda
- Clade: †Gravisauria
- Family: †Vulcanodontidae
- Genus: †Tazoudasaurus
- Species: †T. naimi

Binomial name
- †Tazoudasaurus naimi Allain et al., 2004

= Tazoudasaurus =

Tazoudasaurus Temporal range: Toarcian ~183–174 Ma Uncertain allocation of the layers

Extinct genus of dinosaurs

Tazoudasaurus is a genus of gravisaurian (probably vulcanodontid) sauropod dinosaurs from the late Early Jurassic (Toarcian). It was recovered in the "Toundoute Continental Series" (Azilal Formation), located in the High Atlas Mountains of Morocco in North Africa. Along with Patagosaurus, Volkheimeria, Bagualia, and Perijasaurus (perhaps Barapasaurus and Kotasaurus as well), it represents one of the few sauropods named from this stage on Gondwana, as well as the only one from Africa.

== Discovery and naming ==
Back in the early 2000s, several excavations took place in the High Atlas near Toundoute, in the province of Ouarzazate, where a series 300 m thick continental redbeds are exposed. In these redbeds, two main fossiliferous localities were initially denominated "To1 site" and excavated in the Duar of Tazouda, a hill near Toundoute, separated 30 m from each other. The remains, consisting of the holotype, a partial adult skeleton and cranial material (specimen To 2000–1) including complete left mandible with teeth, quadrate, jugal, postorbital, parietal, frontal and exoccipital, as well as an associated partial juvenile skeleton (specimen To 2000–2) found in continental detrital sediments of the Toarcian aged Azilal Formation, were described by Ronan Allain et al. in early 2004. The generic name derives from one of the localities, Tazouda, while the specific descriptor is a Latinization of the Berber term for "slender" due to the animal's small size for a sauropod. Latter work on the same area yielded new dinosaurian material, with the new localities, with the original yielding another juvenile, "To1´" (one adult, a subadult and a juvenile specimen), "Pt haut-Pt" (adult and the Ceratosaurian Theropod Berberosaurus) "O-R", with indeterminate amniote material and finally "To2", with a subadult Tazoudasaurus and a large-bodied theropod. By 2010, 10 specimens where known. Additional material of the genus may have been discovered before the excavations on Toundoute, as material recovered in the 40 to 80s at the east of the Azilal Village in the province of the same name, include gravisaur material very similar to Tazoudasaurus, composed of a pelvis and other indeterminate remains.

=== Tazouda Dinosaur Museum ===
The Tazouda Dinosaur Museum is dedicated to the beds where Tazoudasaurus was discovered. Some researchers, like Najat Akesbi, proposed the creation of a museum to house the local dinosaur fossils, as part of the "Dino Atlas" project. It is configured in complementarity with the Azilal museum and the M'goun Geopark to constitute what is called "the route of the dinosaurs".

== Description ==
Tazoudasaurus is one of the most complete basal sauropods known. Several specimens, representing ten different individuals, have been found. Both juveniles and adults are represented. As of 2010, the sites were not fully excavated and many of the bones had not been prepared for study. The skull is represented by a few disarticulated bones and a nearly complete lower jaw from the holotype individual. The neck is known from eight cervical vertebrae, of which only three had been prepared as of 2008. Numerous dorsal and caudal vertebrae have been found. A single scapula and coracoid, not from the same individual, have been found. The humerus, radius, and ulna are known. The front foot is nearly completely known from a juvenile individual. The ilium, ischium, pubis, femur, tibia, fibula, and astragalus are all known. The hind foot is less completely known than the front foot, and its anatomy cannot be fully reconstructed from known material.

Scaled type specimen

Tazoudasaurus, was a small sauropod at 11 meters (36 feet)-14 meters (46 feet) long, is characterized by rather primitive features such as the prosauropod-like mandible with spatulate and denticle-bearing teeth, lack of a U-shaped mandibular symphysis as other more derived sauropods. Teeth wear in V-shaped marks indicates tooth occlusion, suggesting that vulcanodontids processed food orally when feeding. The frontal and the parietal are incomplete, the former being broken anteriorly and the latter posteriorly. The neck is flexible with elongate vertebrae that lack true pleurocoels while dorsal and caudal vertebrae series tend to be more rigid. T. naimi bears the most complete fossil skeleton for Early Jurassic sauropod remains found to date due to the scarcity of exposed strata of that age.

Disarticulated elements of the skull roof and of the braincase have been recovered, showing an incomplete fronto-parietal firmly fused together, with the frontals suggesting a larger than wider shape, and the parietal lacking an anterolateral process, something more akin to non-Sauropod Sauropodomorphs. The postorbital shows a bony plate contact with the squamosal, something unseen in the more typical "tongue-and-groove" contact of other Sauropods. The quadrate bends laterally in the posterior half in a similar way to the one of Plateosaurus. The lower jaws are known thanks to one dentary CPSGM To1-275 suggesting a weak connection between the left and right lower jaws. The associated teeth show features typical of Sauropodomorphs and basal sauropods, such as conical denticles on the mesial and distal margins.

The cervical vertebrae have an axis and neural arch that lacks the marked external pneumatic structures of more advanced sauropods. The ratio of length/height for the two main preserved cervicals are about 2.5, which is less than genera such as Omeisaurus, Mamenchisaurus or Euhelopus. They also lack cpol, seen in taxa such as Patagosaurus. The dorsal vertebrae are higher than the cervicals, showing an arched upwards ventral surface of the centrum, like in the Rutland Cetiosaurus. The middle dorsals have a greater centra, neural spines more prominent posteriorly and transverse processes with a more dorsal direction than both anterior and posterior vertebrae. The caudals lack the deep groove in the ventral surface seen in Vulcanodon.

The coracoid is massive with an oval outline, lacking the glenoid notch seen in Cetiosaurus or Suuwassea. The humerus is expanded in both directions, and the ulna shows an olecranon region wider than in Vulcanodon. The front feet are intermediate in form between those of prosauropods and later sauropods. The femora are straight and anteroposteriorly compressed, having a tibia/femur length ratio around 0.58, expected for sauropods. The fibula is also similar to other sauropods having the same inturned anterior trochanter seen in Vulcanodon. The metacarpals were more spread out and held less vertically than in later sauropods, and did not form the tight, tubular arrangement seen in later sauropods. The phalangeal formula was probably 2-3-2-2-2, (Note: Only two phalanges have been preserved for the second digit, but the second phalanx has an articular surface for a third phalanx.) fewer than in prosauropods but more than in other sauropods, and a prominent thumb claw was present. Each hind foot bore four claws. The claw on the first toe was large and sickle-like, as in other sauropods, whereas the other three claws were flattened, wide, and blunt-tipped, an unusual shape otherwise seen only in Vulcanodon.

The pelvic material includes and ilium lacking the curved preacetabular process seen in other sauropods and a pubis with very similar proportions of the one recovered in Vulcanodon, yet more slender than the usual model seen on latter sauropods.

== Classification ==
At its description, Tazoudasaurus was found to be a sister taxon of Vulcanodon, based mostly on features such as a proximal dimensions of pedal digits II and III significantly broader then deep, considered an autapomorphy of the second genus, and differing only in caudal vertebrae features while it also possesses characters that place it outside Eusauropoda, both on the family Vulcanodontidae, sometimes rendered invalid and paraphyletic, as was meant to include taxa such as the Indian Barapasaurus, that was excluded upon Tazoudasaurus description. A latter deeper osteological redescription of the genus provided a whole new group, Gravisauria, meant to include Vulcanodontidae and Eusauropoda. Several latter works have agreed on the non Eusauropodan classification of Tazoudasaurus, finding it usually closer with Vulcanodon. A recent cladogram after Pol and colleagues, in 2021, summarizes it:

- Sauropodiformes
  - Aardonyx
  - - Leonerasaurus
    - Mussaurus
  - Yizhousaurus
  - - NMQR1551
    - NMQR3314
    - Sauropoda (sensu Yates (2007))
      - - Camelotia
        - Lessemsauridae
          - - Lessemsaurus
            - - Antetonitrus
              - Ingentia
          - - Meroktenos
            - - Kholumolumo
              - Ledumahadi
      - - Gongxianosaurus
        - Pulanesaura
        - - Schleitheimia
          - - Isanosaurus
            - Sauropoda (sensu Salgado et al. (1997))
              - - Tazoudasaurus
                - Vulcanodon
              - Eusauropoda

== Paleoecology and paleobiology ==
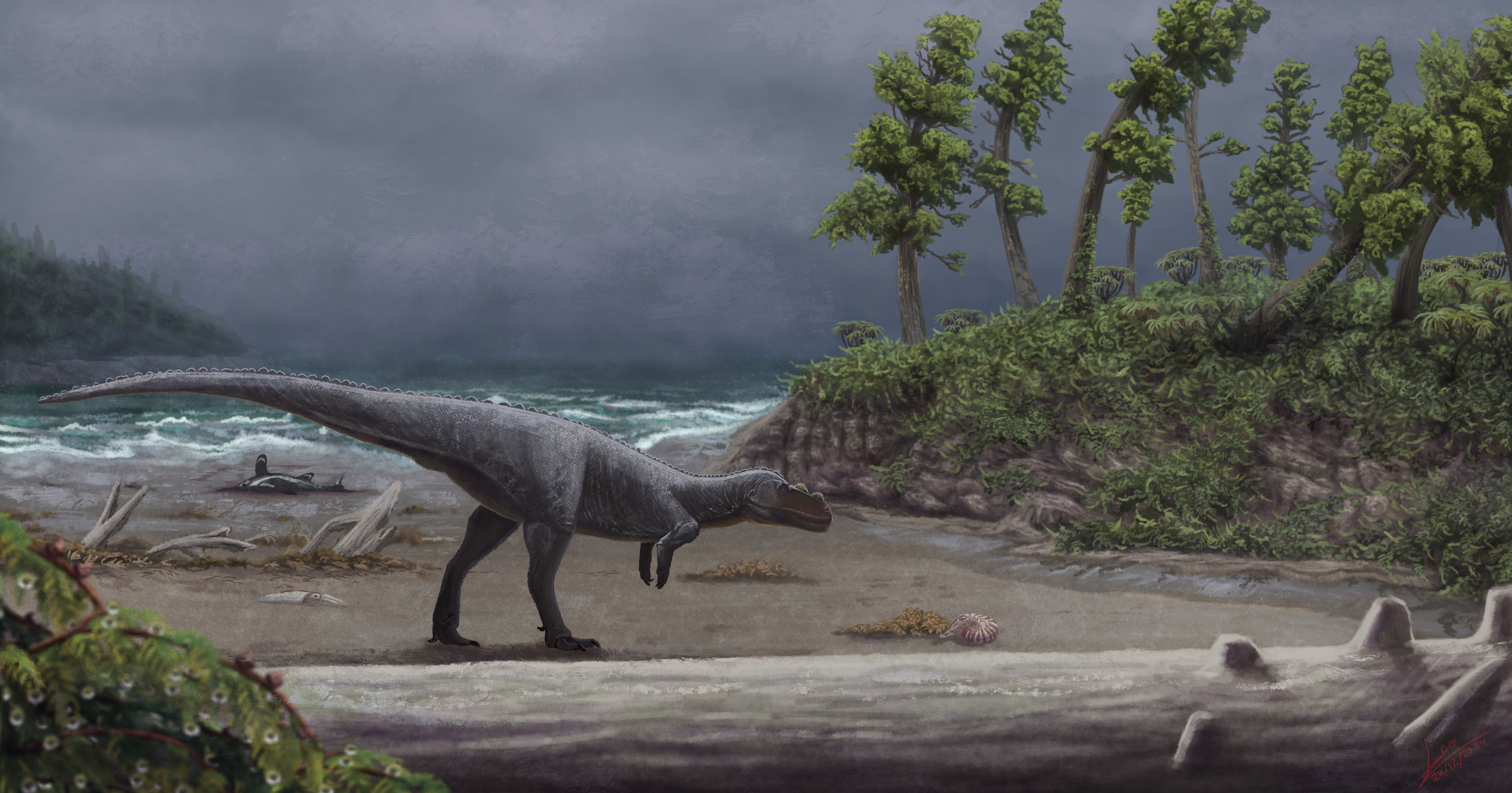
Paleoenvironment reconstruction of the Azilal Formation with Berberosaurus, as a storm-influenced coast. During the Toarcian period, the Tethys bathed the beaches of what is now Morocco. This tropical ocean was often very violent, with recurring storms that especially hit the western beaches.

Tazoudasaurus had likely a gregarious behaviour, based on the agrupation of juvenile, adult and subadult specimens coexisting together in a herd, representing a large plant-eating taxon, originally claimed to be around 10 meters (33 feet)-11 meters (36 feet) long, more recent estimations suggest a maximum length close to 13 meters (43 feet)-14 meters (46 feet) and a weight around 7–8 metric tons (7.7–8.8 short tons).

The "Toundoute Continental Series" is unlike other members of the Azilal Formation due to the presence of volcanic material of coeval age. The Azilal Formation recovers a Terrestrial progradation that happened in the Central High Atlas Basin towards the Toarcian, where the older Pliensbachian Carbonate Platform retreated to the east. The lithology of this unit at Tundoute is divided in 5 units from D to H, (A-C represent the units of the underlying marine dolomite, C representing a transition to a terrestrial environment). These layers have been referred to a Pliensbachian-Toarcian age, as the underliying Carbonates where quoted to belong to the Sinemurian-aged Imi-n-Ifri Formation, with a small transitional layer similar to the Sin-Pliensbachian at Todhra. The section including the bones of Tazoudasaurus & Berberosaurus was likely deposited on a channel/floodplain type fluvial system, with sand-filled channels abundant in plant roots (mostly located in fine limestone, probably from the channel margins), developed in the near E-W direction of transit. These layers also recover the presence of thick (up to 6 m) gypsium facies, which suggest the presence of a local Chott, indicating a succession of humid and dry seasons. Based on mesofossils, local vegetation was apparently dominated by ferns, cycads and conifers. Apart from Berberosaurus, Tazoudasaurus and a large-bodied theropod of uncertain affinities, a possible Coelophysidae with juvenile & adult specimens and a small sauropod have been recovered from Acforcid, E of Demnate, as well Gravisaurian (Tazoudasaurus?) remains at the E of Azilal village, Medium-Sized Sauropod remains at Mizaguène Hill (SW Azilal) and indeterminate Dinosaur remains from other locations around Azilal and Demnate.

== See also ==
- Atlasaurus
- Atlas Mountains
