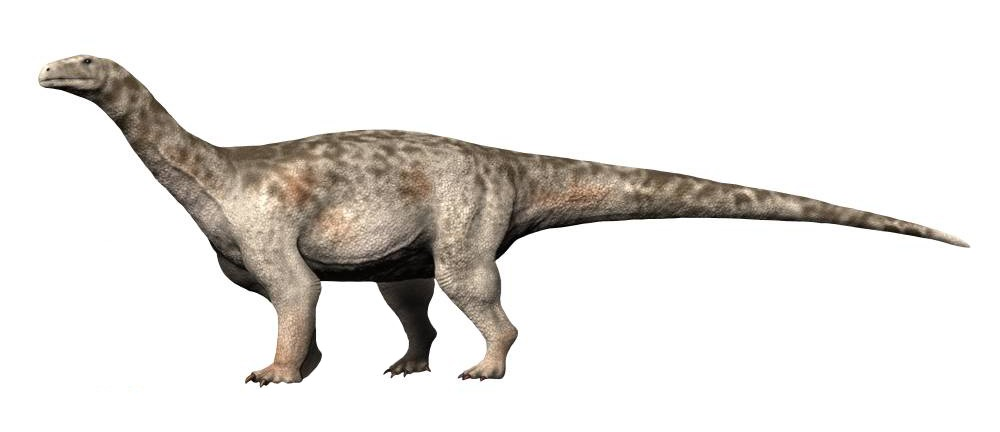
- Restoration of Ledumahadi mafube

Scientific classification
- Domain: Eukaryota
- Kingdom: Animalia
- Phylum: Chordata
- Clade: Dinosauria
- Clade: Saurischia
- Clade: †Sauropodomorpha
- Clade: †Sauropoda
- Family: †Lessemsauridae
- Genus: †Ledumahadi; McPhee et al., 2018

Type species
- †Ledumahadi mafube McPhee et al., 2018

= Ledumahadi =

Ledumahadi Temporal range: Hettangian-Sinemurian, 200–195 Ma

Sauropodomorph dinosaur genus from Early Jurassic South Africa

Ledumahadi (meaning "giant thunderclap" in Sesotho language) is a genus of lessemsaurid sauropodomorph dinosaur from the Early Jurassic Elliot Formation in Free State Province, South Africa. The type and only species is L. mafube, known from a singular incomplete postcranial specimen. A quadruped, it was one of the first giant sauropodomorphs, reaching a weight of around 12 tonnes (13 short tons), despite not having evolved columnar limbs like its later huge relatives.

== Description ==
Ledumahadi was likely a quadruped, as determined by analysis of the circumference of its humerus and femur compared to those of other dinosaurs. It would have had very large, robust forelimbs, consistent with those of its relatives. Unlike those of later sauropods, these limbs were naturally flexed, as opposed to being purely columnar.

=== Size ===
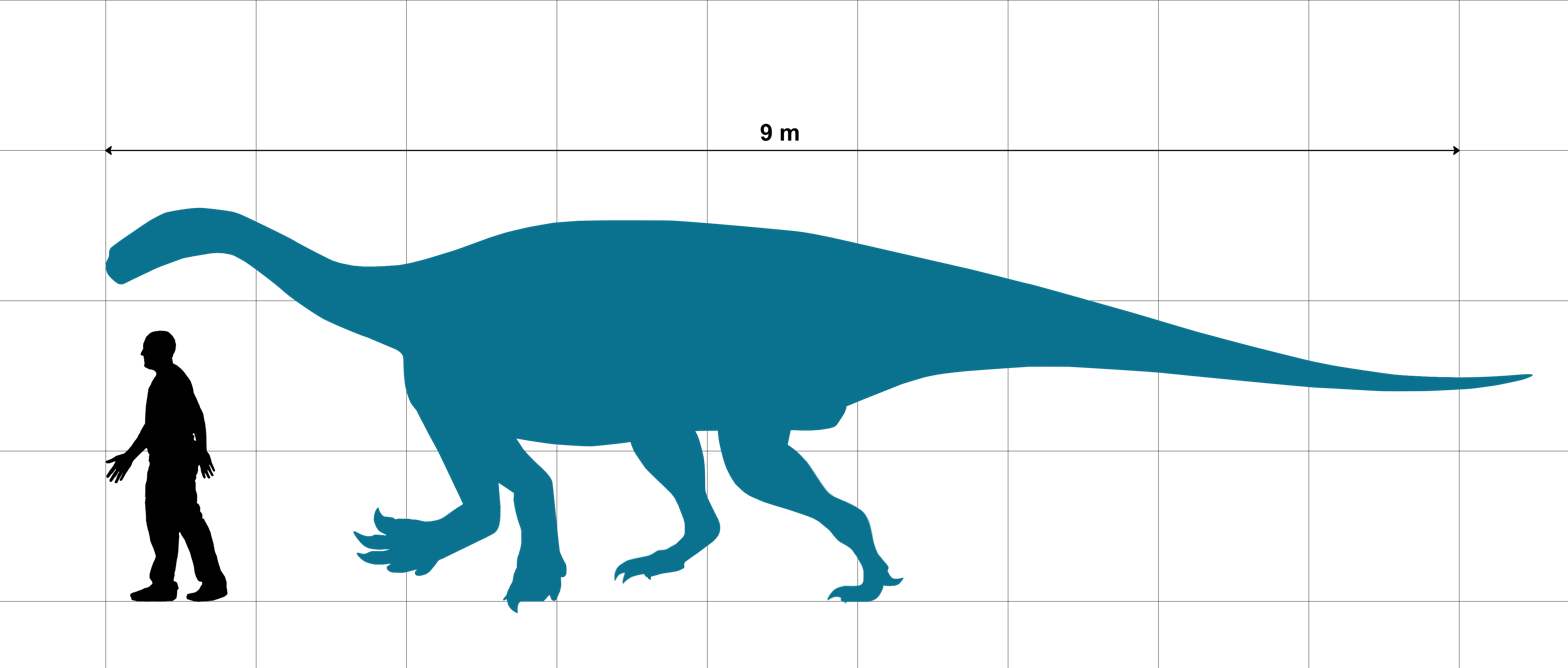
Size of Ledumahadi compared to a human

At its time in the Early Jurassic epoch, Ledumahadi is thought to have been the largest land animal that had ever lived. At the age of 14 years, L. mafube is estimated to have reached a maximum size of around 12 tonnes (13 short tons) in body mass, significantly larger than its relatives. L. mafube was more comparable to the later sauropod Diplodocus in body mass. An ichnotaxon named Tetrasauropus belongs to a sauropodomorph that is estimated to have a hip height of 2 m (6.6 ft), meaning that it likely belongs to Ledumahadi.

== Classification ==
A phylogenetic analysis of Ledumahadi mafube was performed by McPhee and colleagues, which found it to belong to a recently recognised clade of sauropodiformes called Lessemsauridae, including the closely related South African Antetonitrus and Lessemsaurus from Argentina. Another lessemsaurid described in 2018, Ingentia, could not be included in their analysis but was also recognised as belonging to Lessemsauridae. The results of McPhee and colleagues' analysis are shown in the cladogram below:

- Sauropodiformes
  - Yunnanosaurus
  - - Mussaurus
    - - Aardonyx
      - - NMQR 1551
        - - NMQR 3314
          - - Blikanasaurus
            - - Camelotia
              - - Lessemsauridae
                  - Lessemsaurus
                  - - Antetonitrus
                    - Ledumahadi
                - - Leonerasaurus
                  - - Gongxianosaurus
                    - - Pulanesaura
                      - Sauropoda

The size of the taxon was deemed to be important in the wider picture of sauropodomorph evolution, similar to its other lessemsaurid relatives. Living only a few million years after the Triassic-Jurassic extinction event, it indicates that this event must have either had only a small effect on body size within the sauropodomorph lineage, or may have not affected it at all. Significance was also found in the magnitude of the size itself—it lacked the columnar limbs that characterized its more derived relatives, thought to be a key adaptation in body size evolution. Ornithischian dinosaurs reach their largest sizes around a similar size of 12 to 17 tonnes in weight. This may have been the upper limit for dinosaurs without adopting the characteristics found in true sauropods, which grew to be several times the weight of Ledumahadi.

== See also ==
- 2018 in paleontology
