= Schleitheimia =

Schleitheimia Temporal range: Norian ~222–209 Ma

Scientific classification
- Domain: Eukaryota
- Kingdom: Animalia
- Phylum: Chordata
- Clade: Dinosauria
- Clade: Saurischia
- Clade: †Sauropodomorpha
- Clade: †Sauropodiformes
- Genus: †Schleitheimia; Rauhut, Holwerda & Furrer, 2020

Type species
- †Schleitheimia schutzi Rauhut, Holwerda & Furrer, 2020

Extinct genus of dinosaurs

Schleitheimia (named after the type locality of Schleitheim), is an extinct genus of sauropodiform sauropodomorph dinosaur, from the Gruhalde Member of Klettgau Formation of Switzerland. The type species, Schleitheimia schutzi was formally described in 2020.

== Discovery and naming ==
The type material was collected between 1952 and 1954 by Emil Schutz. They were donated to the University of Zürich in 1955. In 1986, most of the material was described by Peter Galton, who referred them all to the species Plateosaurus engelhardti.

In 2020, Oliver Rauhut, Femke Holwerda and Heinz Furrer redescribed most of Schutz's remains, as well as some remains in the collections of the Museum zu Allerheiligen in Schaffhausen and new remains from an excavation in 2016 led by Holwerda. They found that the earlier found remains represented a new genus and species, which they named Schleitheimia schultzi, honoring the type locality and the discoverer of the type remains. The 2016 finds were not referred. Finds made by Schultz near Hallau-Schwärzibuck were considered to represent a different previously unknown taxon and remained unnamed.

The holotype, PIMUZ A/III 550, was found in a layer of the Klettgau Formation dating from the Norian. It consists of a partial right ilium. Several other bones from the general locality were designated as paratypes. Because they are consistent in morphology, the describers referred all of them to the same taxon, if not the same individual.

== Description ==
The holotype of Schleitheimia shows a number of autapomorphies, unique derived traits. There is a broad, rounded ridge on the iliac blade that ends in a large, rounded expansion on the ilium. The fourth tronchanter of the ilium is very robust. The crista tibiofibularis of the femur is broad and there is no posteriorly facing shelf is present lateral to the crista.

== Classification ==
A phylogenetic analysis conducted by Rauhut and colleagues found Schleitheimia to be a derived sauropodiform closely related to Sauropoda, or a basal member of that clade, depending on the definition used (node or stem based). A cladogram from that analysis is shown below:

- Sauropodiformes
  - Xingxiulong
  - - - Anchisaurus
      - Leonerasaurus
    - - Mussaurus
      - - Aardonyx
        - - Sefapanosaurus
          - - Meroktenos
            - - Melanorosaurus
              - Sauropoda sensu Yates, 2007
                - Camelotia
                - - - Lessemsaurus
                    - - Antetonitrus
                      - Ingentia
                  - - Blikanasaurus
                    - - Pulanesaura
                      - - Gongxianosaurus
                        - - Schleitheimia
                          - - Isanosaurus
                            - - Tazoudasaurus
                              - Sauropoda sensu Salgado et al., 1997 (=Gravisauria)
