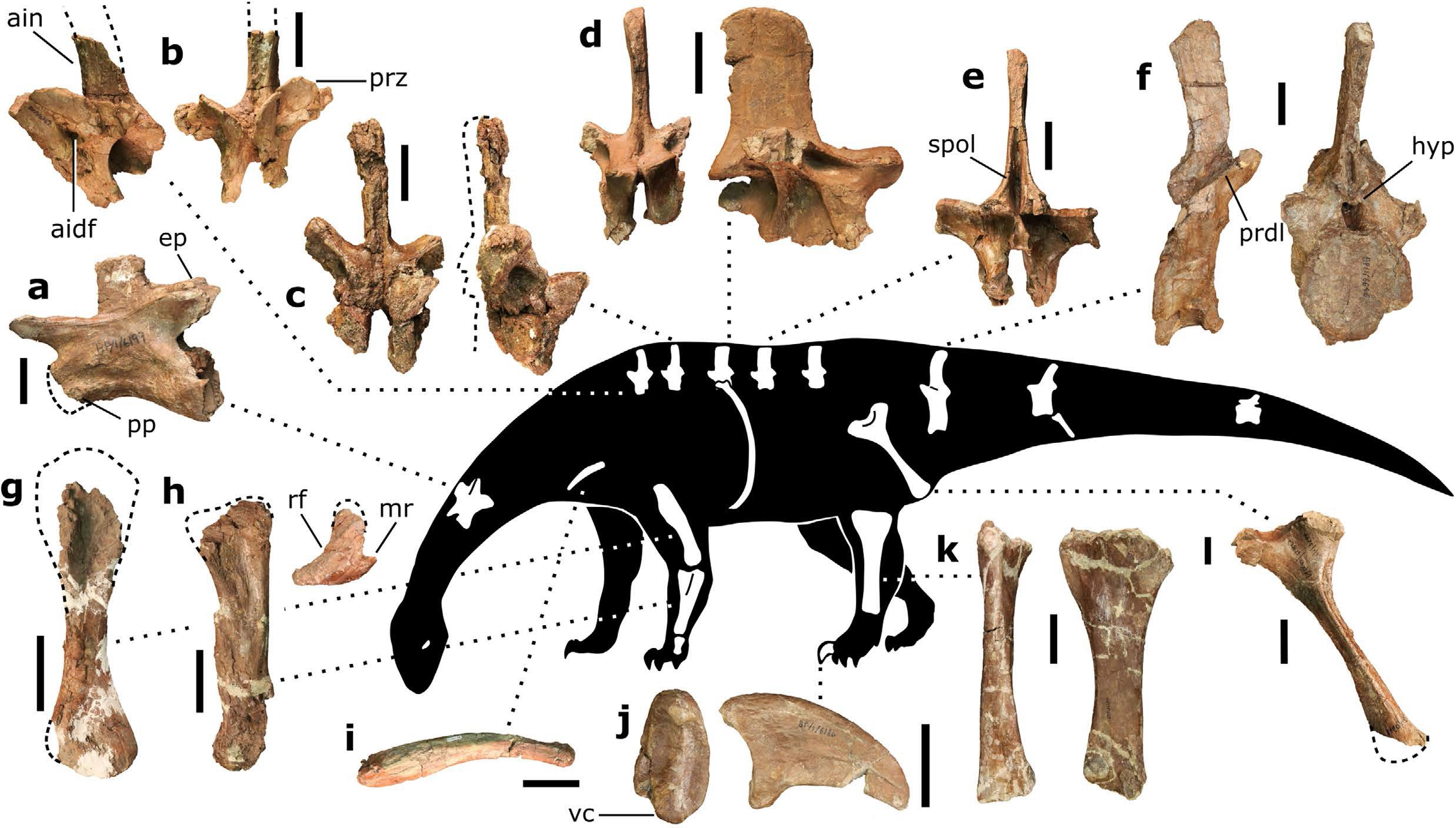
- Skeletal restoration

Scientific classification
- Kingdom: Animalia
- Phylum: Chordata
- Clade: Dinosauria
- Clade: Saurischia
- Clade: †Sauropodomorpha
- Clade: †Sauropodiformes
- Clade: †Sauropoda
- Genus: †Pulanesaura; McPhee et al., 2015

Type species
- †Pulanesaura eocollum McPhee et al., 2015

= Pulanesaura =

Pulanesaura Temporal range: Hettangian-Sinemurian, ~200 Ma

Extinct genus of dinosaurs from the early Jurassic of South Africa

Pulanesaura is an extinct genus of basal sauropodiform known from the Early Jurassic (late Hettangian to Sinemurian) Upper Elliot Formation of the Free State, South Africa. It contains a single species, Pulanesaura eocollum, known from partial remains of at least two subadult to adult individuals.

== Discovery and naming ==
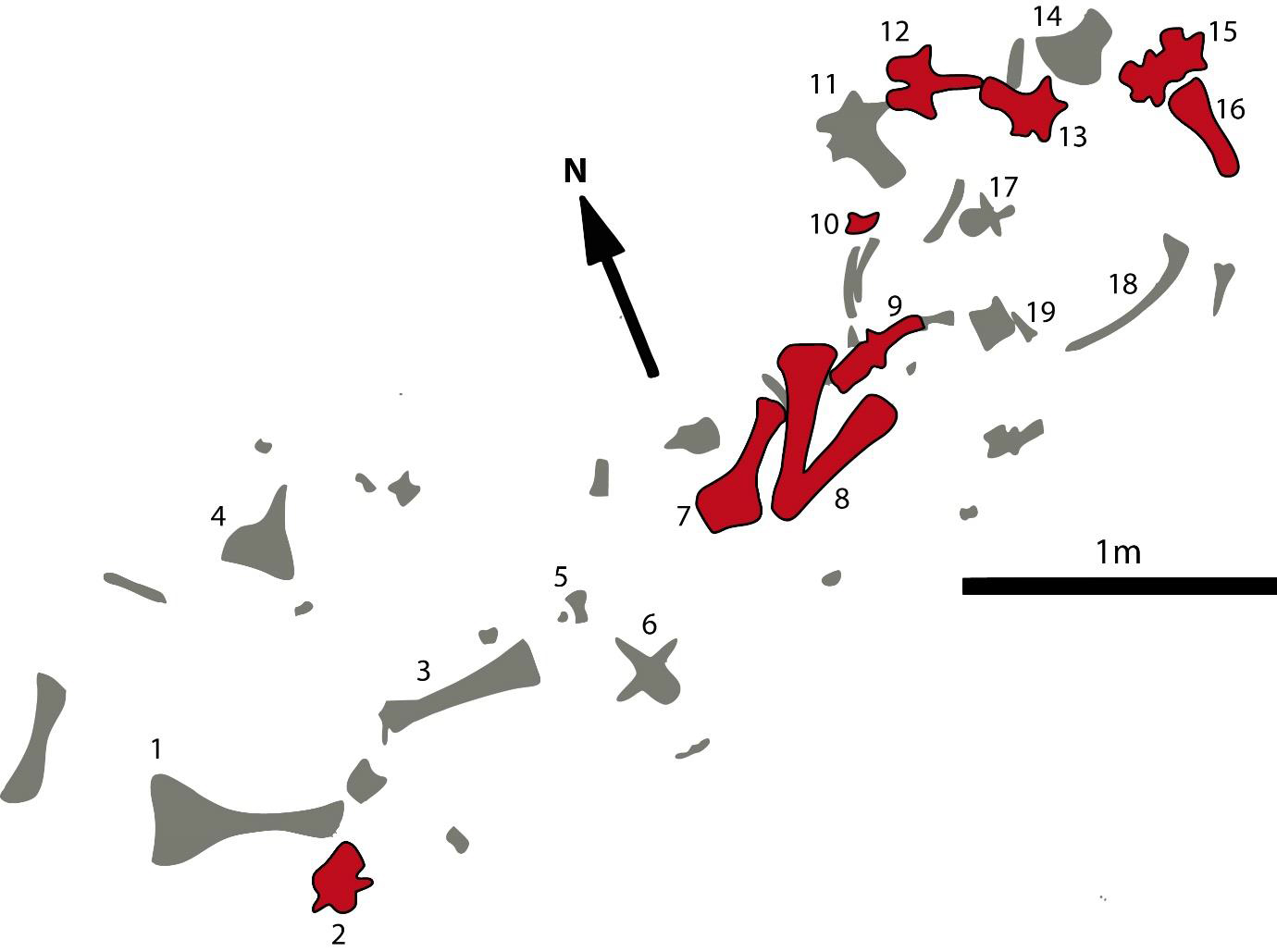
Quarry map

The remains of Pulanesaura were discovered in a small quarry in the farm Spion Kop 932 in the Senekal District of the Free State in 2004 by paleontologist Matthew Bonnan. The bones were excavated between 2004 and 2006, and studied by Blair McPhee as part of his dissertation since 2011. Pulanesaura was then described and named officially by Blair W. McPhee, Matthew F. Bonnan, Adam M. Yates, Johann Neveling and Jonah N. Choiniere in 2015 with the type species Pulanesaura eocollum. The generic name is derived from the Sesoth word for "rain-maker/bringer", Pulane, in reference to the heavy rain conditions under which the remains were collected, and the feminine form of the common dinosaur name suffix, saura, meaning "lizard" in Latin. The specific name is derived from Greek eo, meaning "dawn", and Latin collum, meaning "neck", in reference to Pulanesaura being a very basal sauropod not yet showing the most archetypal trait of more advanced sauropods - their very long necks. Pulanesaura was one of eighteen dinosaur taxa from 2015 to be described in open access or free-to-read journals.

Pulanesaura is known from partial remains of at least two subadult to adult individuals. The holotype, BP/1/6982, represents the front dorsal vertebra missing the tip of the neural spine. In addition the referred material consists of two isolated teeth, a middle cervical vertebra, five back vertebral arches, a single right dorsal rib, three tail vertebrae, a left clavicle, a distal right humerus, a left ulna, possibly the fourth right middle hand bone, three ischia, a left and a right shinbones, and two hindlimb first claws. The remains are considered to be conspecific with the holotype due to their close association (in an area of three to three and a half meters) in fine and stable sandstone, their consistent morphology, and the fact the same elements from different individuals show no conflict in traits. The remains were collected on the farm Spion Kop 932, in a quarry located just over a kilometer East-North East another dinosaur rich quarry in a higher stratigraphic position within the probably Sinemurian part of the upper Elliot Formation, that yielded the less advanced sauropodomorphs Aardonyx celestae and the much smaller Arcusaurus pereirabdalorum.

== Phylogeny ==
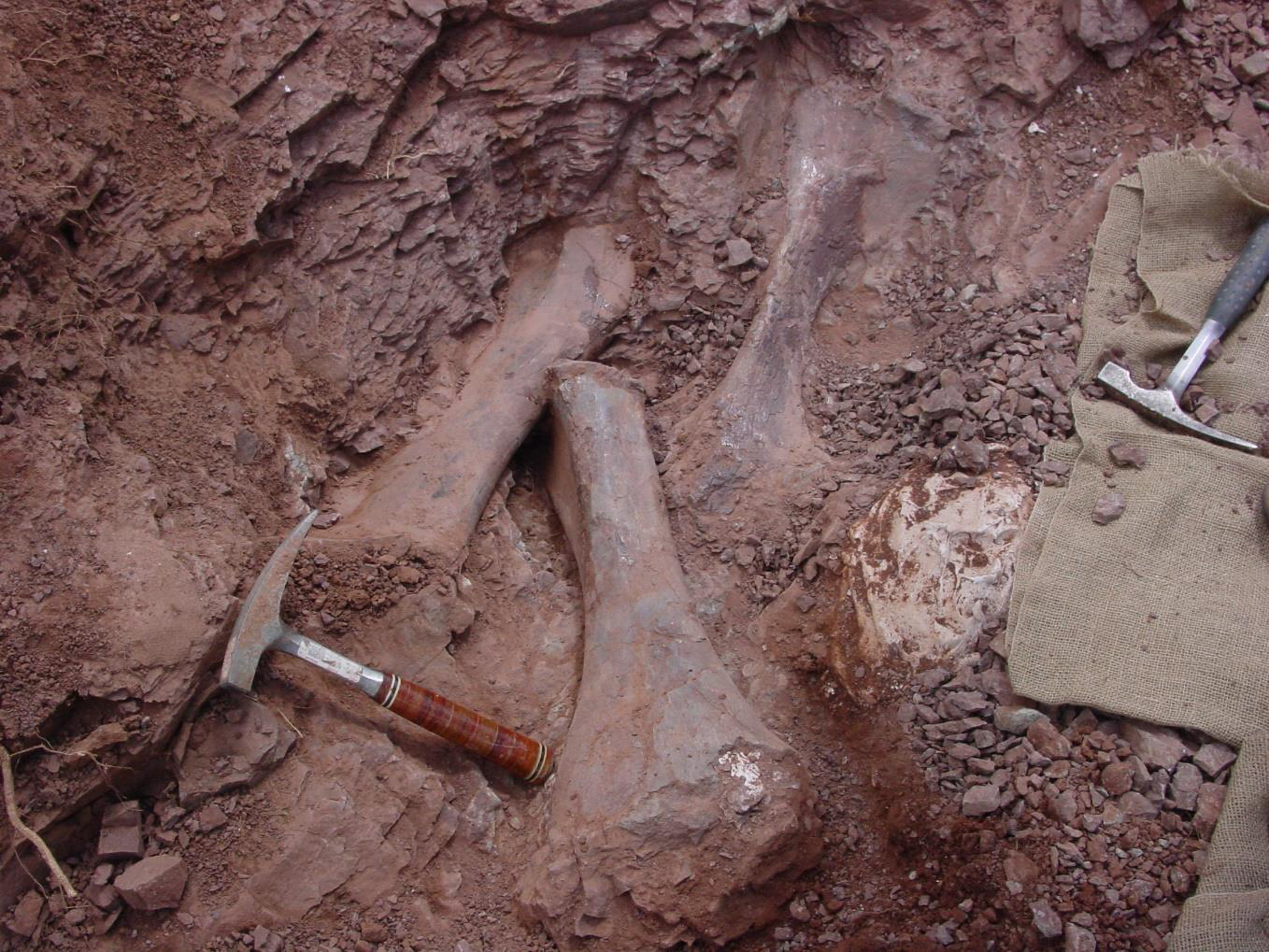
Tibiae and ischium during excavation

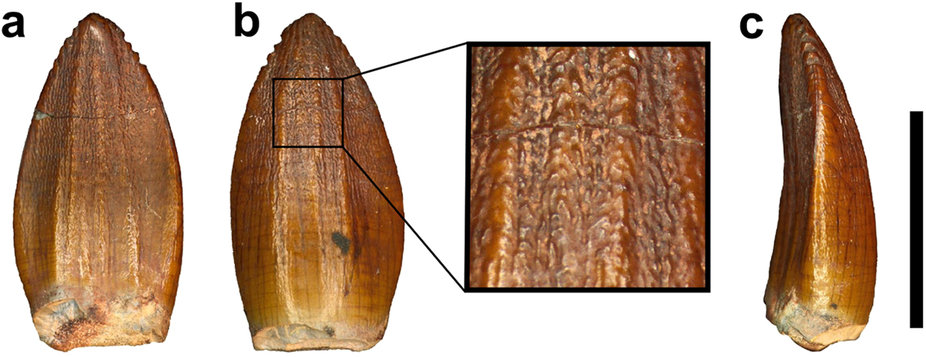
Tooth

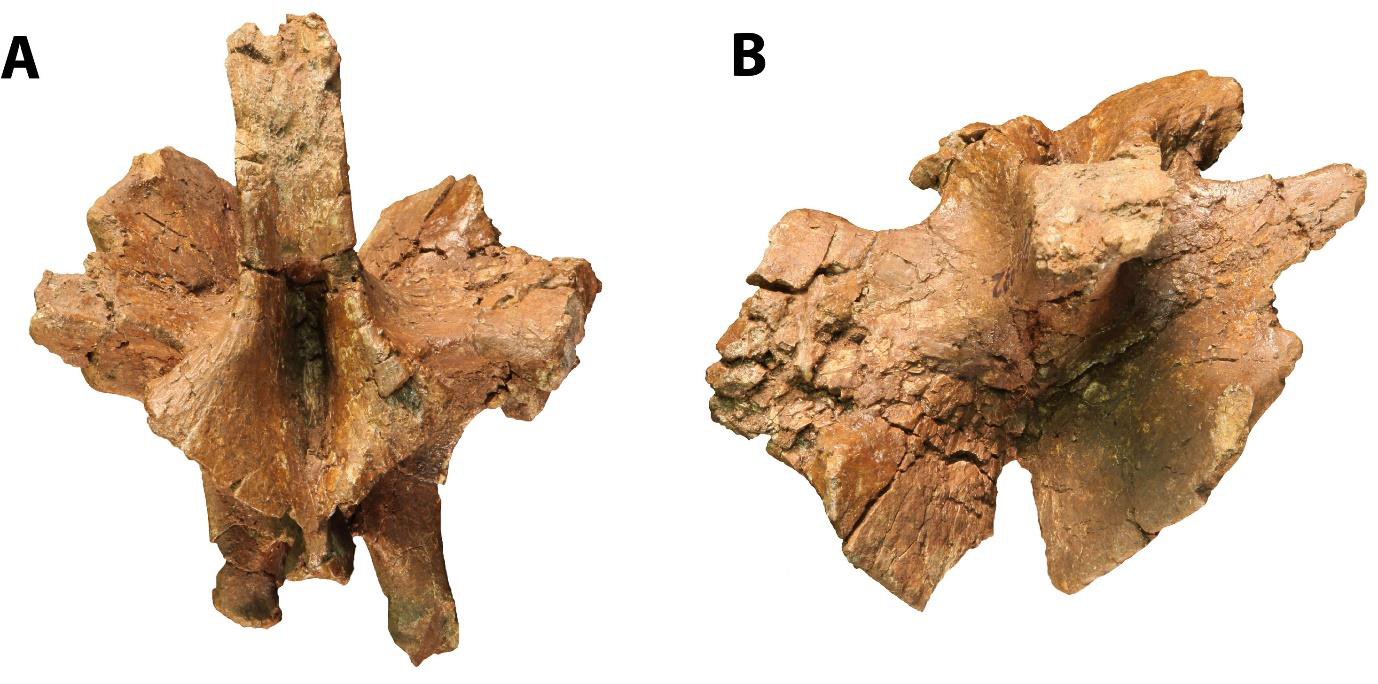
The holotype, a front dorsal vertebra

Pulanesaura is a medium-sized transitional sauropodiform. A phylogenetic analysis resolved its position as either one of the least derived sauropods or as the sister taxon to Sauropoda, depending on the definition for Sauropoda used (node or stem based). The following cladogram is simplified after this analysis (members of bold taxa are not shown).

- Plateosauria
  - Ruehleia
  - Plateosauridae
  - Massopoda
    - Riojasauridae
    - - Massospondylidae
      - Sauropodiformes
        - Yunnanosaurus
        - - Jingshanosaurus
          - Seitaad
        - Anchisauria
          - Anchisaurus
          - Mussaurus
          - - Aardonyx
            - Blikanasaurus
            - Melanorosaurus
            - Sauropoda ?
              - - Antetonitrus
                - Lessemsaurus
              - - Leonerasaurus
                - - Gongxianosaurus
                  - - Pulanesaura
                    - Sauropoda ?
                      - Vulcanodon
                      - - Isanosaurus
                        - - Tazoudasaurus
                          - - Spinophorosaurus
                            - Eusauropoda

The following cladogram shows the position of Pulanesaura within Massopoda, according to Oliver W. M. Rauhut and colleagues, 2020:

- Massopoda
  - - Eucnemesaurus
    - Riojasaurus
  - - Sarahsaurus
    - - Massospondylidae
        - - Yunnanosaurus
          - - Jingshanosaurus
            - Seitaad
        - - - Coloradisaurus
            - - Glacialisaurus
              - Lufengosaurus
          - - Massospondylus
            - - Adeopapposaurus
              - Leyesaurus
      - Sauropodiformes
        - Xingxiulong
        - - - Anchisaurus
            - Leonerasaurus
          - - Mussaurus
            - - Aardonyx
              - - Sefapanosaurus
                - - Meroktenos
                  - - Melanorosaurus
                    - - Camelotia
                      - - - Lessemsaurus
                          - - Antetonitrus
                            - Ingentia
                        - - Blikanasaurus
                          - - Pulanesaura
                            - - Gongxianosaurus
                              - - Schleitheimia
                                - - Isanosaurus
                                  - - Tazoudasaurus
                                    - Sauropoda

== Paleoecology ==
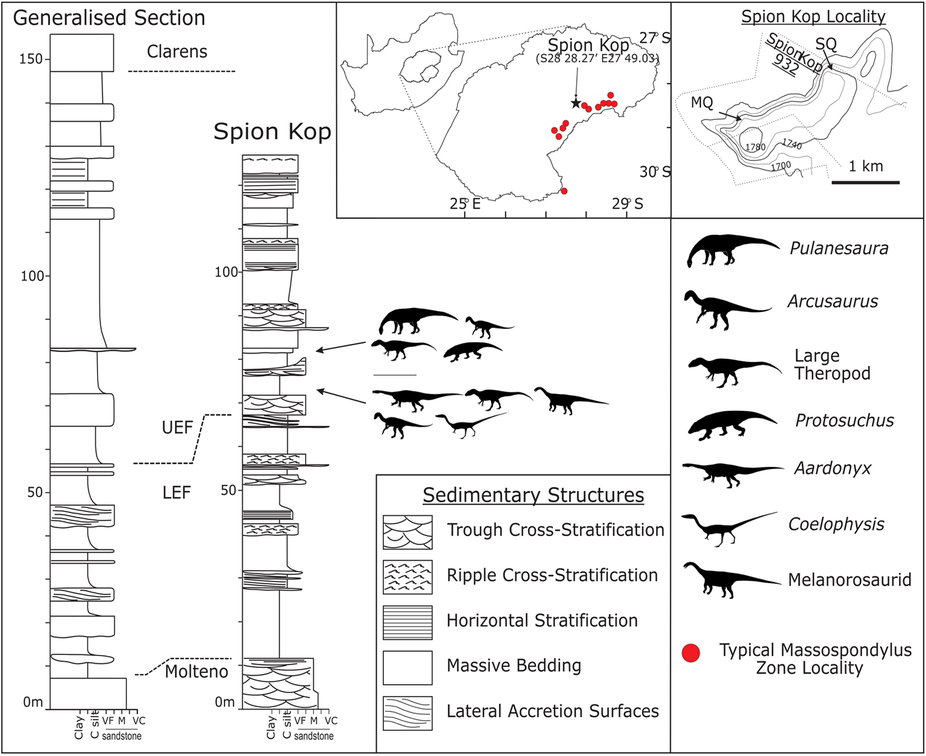
Fauna from the upper Elliot Formation in Spion Kop Farm

Pulanesaura's posture and skeletal build indicate that the animal was a low browser, unlike the prosauropods it shared its habitat with. Studies by Blair McPhee et al. indicate that Pulanesaura is thought to have coexisted with other sauropodomorphs found in the same formation due to niche partitioning. Its flexible neck would have further allowed it to feed without moving its body very often and expending valuable energy; a trait that later sauropods would take to extreme lengths. Studies of the Upper Elliot Formation suggest that the environment was a predominantly arid floodplain where vegetation was concentrated most heavily around the river channels that flowed through the area, further allowing the coexistence of Pulanesaura with other sauropodomorphs such as Aardonyx and Arcusaurus.
