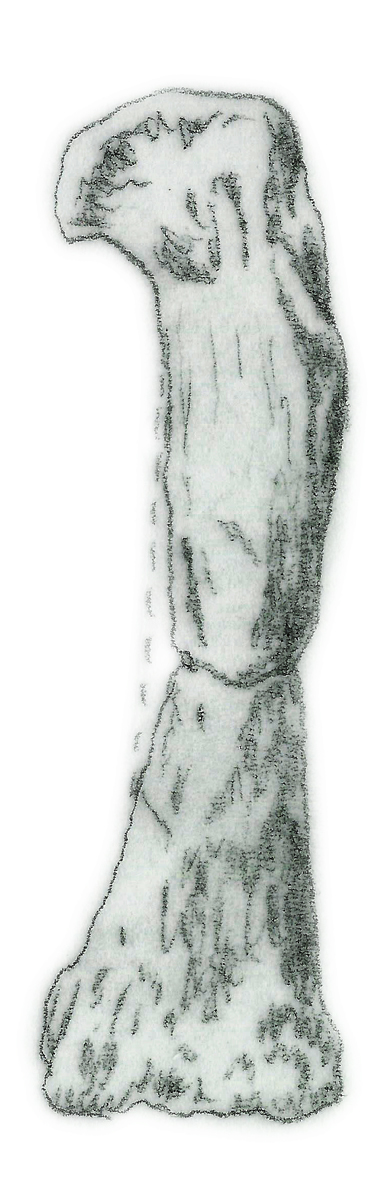
- Holotype femur of Camelotia borealis (NHMUK PV R 2870)

Scientific classification
- Kingdom: Animalia
- Phylum: Chordata
- Class: Reptilia
- Clade: Dinosauria
- Clade: Saurischia
- Clade: †Sauropodomorpha
- Family: †Melanorosauridae
- Genus: †Camelotia; Galton, 1985
- Species: †C. borealis

Binomial name
- †Camelotia borealis Galton, 1985

= Camelotia =

Camelotia Temporal range: Late Triassic, Rhaetian

Extinct genus of basal sauropodomorph dinosaurs

Camelotia (meaning "from Camelot") is a large-bodied sauropodomorph from the latest Triassic (Rhaetian) of southwest England. It is best known from a partial postcranial skeleton found in the Westbury Formation and named by Peter M. Galton in 1985. Subsequent work has generally placed Camelotia as a relatively derived sauropodomorph close to the origin of Sauropoda, although its exact position among early non-sauropod sauropodomorphs remains debated. It is sometimes placed in Melanorosauridae as a close relative of Melanorosaurus. With a body length and mass estimated at 8–10 metres (26–33 ft) and 3.8 tonnes (8,400 lb), respectively, it is one of the largest sauropodomorphs known from the Triassic.

== Discovery and naming ==
The first discovery of a large dinosaur in the Triassic of England was in 1894 in the parish of Wedmore, where quarrying to the south-east of the village exposed multiple large fragments brought to the attention of William Ayshford Sanford by his brother-in-law Sydenham Henry Augustus Hervey. Sanford and Hervey collected multiple bones themselves, and from the cottages of the quarry workmen, and Sanford cleaned and prepared them to compare with other dinosaurs. Taking the bones, including partial limbs and other elements, to the Natural History Museum, London for comparison, he would they bore enough resemblance to those of Megalosaurus to conclude that a very large megalosaur was present in the Mendip Hills during the Triassic. However, despite their clear difference from other known taxa, Sanford declined to name them and instead gave them to the NHMUK to be studied by palaeontologist Harry Govier Seeley.

Seeley published his description of the numerous specimens in 1898. From the collection included two teeth, multiple bones of the hindlimb and foot, dorsal and caudal vertebrae, and ribs. The condition of the bones was imperfect, with them found crushed and scattered by a combination of transport before burial and geologic changes since burial. The first tooth, which he incorrectly noted as found within the jaw, he named Avalonia sanfordi, while the second tooth, the one actually found within a partial jaw that immediately crumbled into mud when exposed, he named Picrodon herveyi. To Avalonia he also assigned the femur and other parts of the hindlimb, while the dorsal vertebrae were referred to either the larger Avalonia or smaller Picrodon based on their size. Seeley considered Avalonia a closer relative of Zanclodon and Picrodon a closer relative of Megalosaurus, though both were still related megalosaurs. As the genus name Avalonia was preoccupied by a trilobite named in 1889, the dinosaur was renamed Avalonianus by Oskar Kuhn in 1961.

Avalonianus was considered a synonym of Gresslyosaurus by German palaeontologist Friedrich von Huene in 1908 and again in 1932, and then retained as a separate member of the prosauropod family Melanorosauridae by British palaeontologist Alan J. Charig and colleagues in 1965. Though a melanorosaurid identity of Avalonianus was supported by further studies, it was also considered undiagnostic by some as the tooth it was founded upon cannot be distinguished from other taxa. The association of carnivorous teeth like those of Avalonianus with postcranial skeletons of prosauropods was disputed by British palaeontologist Peter M. Galton, who instead considered the teeth to be signs of predation, rather than prosauropods being carnivorous. As a result, in 1985 he removed the postcranial material of Avalonianus and Picrodon to the new taxon Camelotia borealis, leaving only the carnivorous teeth in the former genera. The holotype of Camelotia was indicated to be a series of specimens in the NHMUK Galton believed to belong to a single individual; four dorsal vertebrae, five caudal vertebrae, rib and chevron fragments, a pubis, an ischium, a femur, a partial tibia, and two phalanges from the foot under the specimen numbers NHMUK PV R 2870-2874 and R 2876-2878. The generic name chosen was derived from Camelot, the legendary seat of King Arthur that was probably in Somerset, while the specific name was from the Latin for "north", as Camelotia borealis was the only melanorosaurid from the northern hemisphere known at the time.

All the dinosaur remains from Wedmore came from a single small quarry in the vale of Glastonbury, referred to "Rhaetic" beds that correlate with only a portion of the Rhaetian stage of the Late Triassic. To avoid this confusion, the "Rhaetic beds" were given the formal name of the Penarth Group in 1980 by Warrington and colleagues, consisting of a younger Lilstock Formation and an older Westbury Formation. The Wedmore Stone from which Camelotia is known is a local limestone near the base of the Westbury Formation in the region of Wedmore. While it was extensively worked in shallow quarries, the Wedmore Stone is only around 1 m (3.3 ft) thick, and so by 1911 even traces of the former quarries were difficult to locate. Other dinosaur remains have also been found in the Rhaetic Bone Beds of the Westbury Formation of Aust Cliff, and while they are not diagnostic it is possible that they belong to Camelotia based on size.

== Description ==
Although incompletely known, Camelotia was a robust, large-bodied sauropodomorph. The femur is ~1 metre (3 ft 3 in) long (in the holotype), indicating an animal roughly on the order of 8–10 metres (26–33 ft) in length based on comparative scaling to closely related basal sauropodomorphs. Its body mass has been estimated at 3.8 tonnes (8,400 lb). The dentition known from associated material in the same beds is of serrated, leaf-shaped crowns typical of herbivorous sauropodomorphs. Limb and girdle proportions in early near-sauropods suggest increasing forelimb robustness and a trend toward habitual quadrupedality by the earliest Jurassic, but Camelotia itself remains too incomplete for a confident locomotor reconstruction. However, phylogenetic analysis suggests that Camelotia is nested within advanced sauropodomorphs close to Sauropoda that had adopted quadrupedality.

== Classification ==
Camelotia has historically been allied to "prosauropods" (now recognized as a paraphyletic grade). Most recent treatments place it close to Melanorosauridae or as a basal sauropodiform taxon just outside Sauropoda; some analyses consider it potentially a basal sauropod. Because the holotype is fragmentary, its precise placement depends on character sampling across early sauropodomorph matrices, and remains provisional pending new material or re-study. Some phylogenies have recovered it as part of the family Melanorosauridae as a close relative of Melanorosaurus from the Late Triassic of South Africa, though other phylogenies have found them to be unrelated. The cladogram below shows the relationships of Camelotia and other members of Anchisauria relative to true sauropods as found by André Fonseca and colleagues.

- Anchisauria
  - Anchisauridae
    - Leonerasaurus
    - - - Mussaurus
        - Lamplughsaura
      - - Anchisaurus
        - - Aardonyx
          - Sefapanosaurus
  - - NMQR 1551
    - - NMQR 3314
      - - Blikanasaurus
        - - - Camelotia
            - - - Meroktenos
                - - Kholumolumo
                  - Ledumahadi
              - Lessemsauridae
                - Lessemsaurus
                - - Antetonitrus
                  - Ingentia
          - - Schleitheimia
            - - Melanorosaurus
              - Sauropoda

== Ecology ==
Probable large sauropodomorph trackways exposed on the shoreline near Penarth, South Wales assigned to the ichnogenus Eosauropus may have been produced by Camelotia, but this uncertain.

Other dinosaurs known from the Penarth Group (of which the Westbury Formation is part) include the large theropod Newtonsaurus cambrensis. Theropod teeth associated with the holotype Camelotia skeleton which were historically assigned to Avalonianus, were suggested by Galton in 1998 to represent the same species as Newtonsaurus cambrensis. Dinosaurs known from Late Triassic fissure fill deposits in the South Wales-South West England region include the sauropodomorphs Pantydraco, Thecodontosaurus, and the coelophysoid theropod Pendraig, as well as other vertebrates such as procolophonid, rhynchocephalian, and crocodylomorph reptiles, and early mammaliamorphs (mammal-line cynodonts) like tritylodontids and morganucodonts, but it is disputed whether these fissure fills are Rhaetian in age or contain considerably older fossils dating to the Carnian-Norian.
