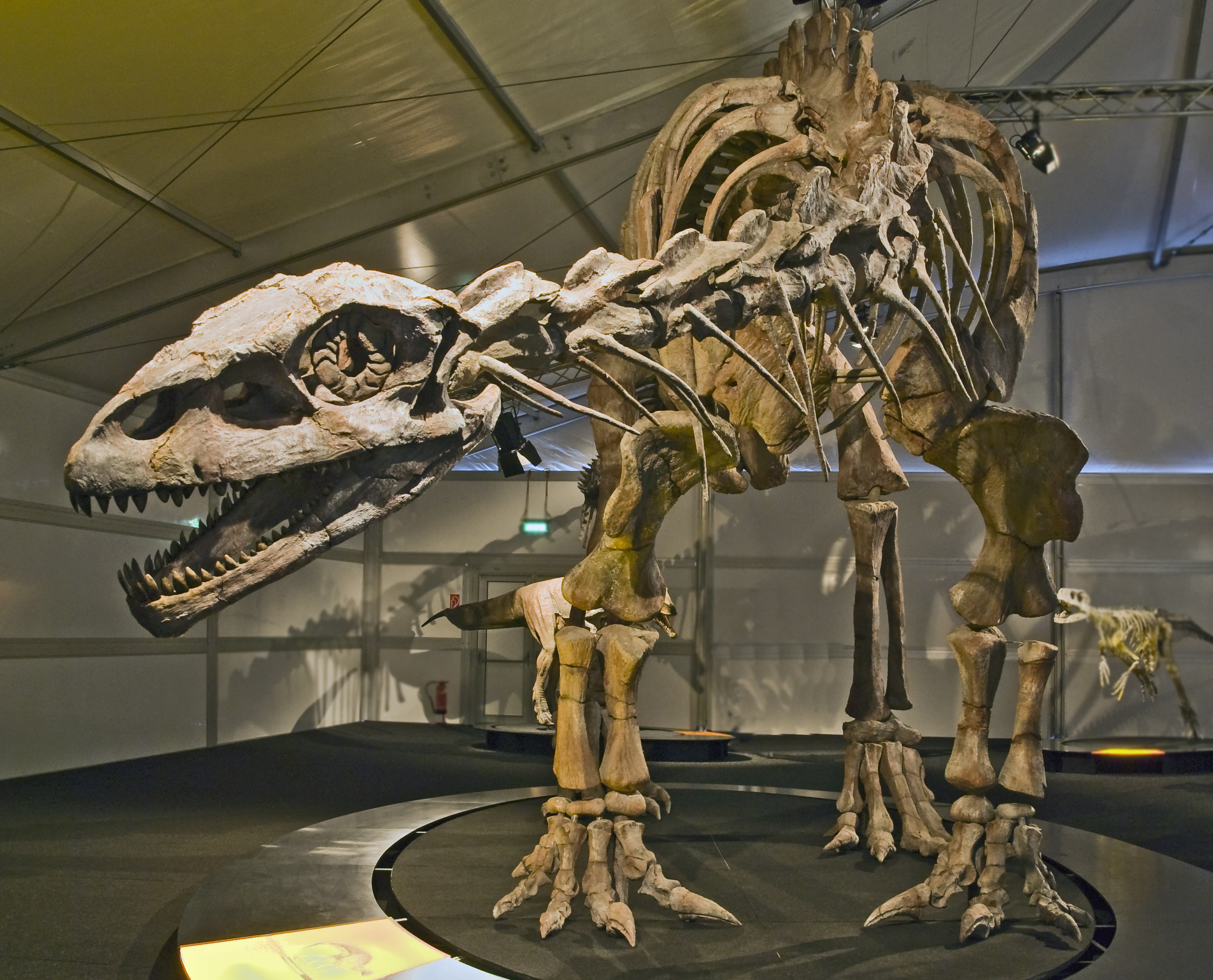
- Reconstructed skeleton

Scientific classification
- Kingdom: Animalia
- Phylum: Chordata
- Class: Reptilia
- Clade: Dinosauria
- Clade: Saurischia
- Clade: †Sauropodomorpha
- Clade: †Sauropoda
- Family: †Lessemsauridae
- Genus: †Lessemsaurus; Bonaparte 1999
- Species: †L. sauropoides

Binomial name
- †Lessemsaurus sauropoides Bonaparte 1999

= Lessemsaurus =

Lessemsaurus Temporal range: mid-Norian ~213 Ma

Sauropodomorph dinosaur genus from Late Triassic Argentina

Lessemsaurus is an extinct genus of sauropodiform dinosaur that lived in the Norian-aged (Upper Triassic) Los Colorados Formation of what is now Argentina.

== Naming and description ==
The type species, L. sauropoides, was formally described by José Fernando Bonaparte in 1999 in honor of Don Lessem, a writer of popular science books. It was found in the Los Colorados Formation of the Ischigualasto-Villa Unión Basin in La Rioja Province, Argentina.

It is part of the La Esquina faunal assemblage, dating to the mid-Norian stage, around 213 million years ago. It is estimated to have reached 10–12 metres (33–39 ft) long and weighed over 7 metric tons (7.7 short tons), possibly up to 8–10 metric tons (8.8–11.0 short tons), in maximum body mass.

== Classification ==
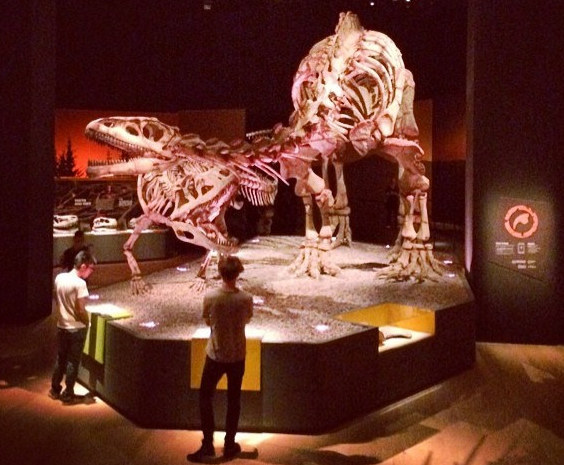
Exhibit in Singapore

A cladogram after Pol, Garrido & Cerda, 2011, illustrates a possible placing of Lessemsaurus and Antetonitrus in Sauropodomorpha:

- Sauropodomorpha
  - Saturnalia
  - - - Pantydraco
      - Thecodontosaurus
    - - Efraasia
      - - Ruehleia
        - Plateosaurus
        - Massopoda
          - Riojasaurus
          - - - Massospondylus
              - - Coloradisaurus
                - Lufengosaurus
                - Gyposaurus
                - Yunnanosaurus
            - Anchisauria
              - Anchisaurus
              - - Aardonyx
                - - Leonerasaurus
                  - - Melanorosaurus
                    - Sauropoda
                      - - Antetonitrus
                        - Lessemsaurus
                      - - Kotasaurus
                        - - Vulcanodon
                          - Eusauropoda

In 2018, Apaldetti et al. recovered it as part of a clade they named Lessemsauridae, after Lessemsaurus. Their cladogram is reproduced below:

- Sauropodiformes
  - Mussaurus
  - - Aardonyx
    - Sefapanosaurus
    - - - Melanorosauridae
          - Camelotia
          - Melanorosaurus
      - - Sauropoda
          - - Lessemsauridae
              - Antetonitrus
              - - Ingentia
                - Lessemsaurus
          - - Blikanasaurus
            - - Gongxianosaurus
              - - Pulanesaura
                - Gravisauria

The following cladogram shows the position of Lessemsaurus outside of Sauropoda, according to Oliver W. M. Rauhut and colleagues, 2020:

- Massopoda
  - - Eucnemesaurus
    - Riojasaurus
  - - Sarahsaurus
    - - Massospondylidae
        - - Yunnanosaurus
          - - Jingshanosaurus
            - Seitaad
        - - - Coloradisaurus
            - - Glacialisaurus
              - Lufengosaurus
          - - Massospondylus
            - - Adeopapposaurus
              - Leyesaurus
      - Sauropodiformes
        - Xingxiulong
        - - - Anchisaurus
            - Leonerasaurus
          - - Mussaurus
            - - Aardonyx
              - - Sefapanosaurus
                - - Meroktenos
                  - - Melanorosaurus
                    - - Camelotia
                      - - - Lessemsaurus
                          - - Antetonitrus
                            - Ingentia
                        - - Blikanasaurus
                          - - Pulanesaura
                            - - Gongxianosaurus
                              - - Schleitheimia
                                - - Isanosaurus
                                  - - Tazoudasaurus
                                    - Sauropoda
