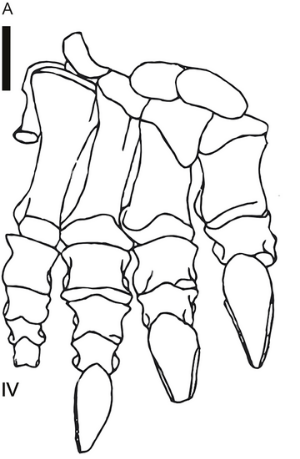
- Pes from the holotype of B. cromptoni

Scientific classification
- Kingdom: Animalia
- Phylum: Chordata
- Class: Reptilia
- Clade: Dinosauria
- Clade: Saurischia
- Clade: †Sauropodomorpha
- Clade: †Sauropoda
- Family: †Blikanasauridae; Galton & van Heerden, 1985
- Genus: †Blikanasaurus; Galton & van Heerden, 1985
- Species: †B. cromptoni

Binomial name
- †Blikanasaurus cromptoni Galton & van Heerden, 1985

= Blikanasaurus =

Blikanasaurus Temporal range: Late Triassic, 210 Ma

Extinct genus of dinosaur from the late Triassic of South Africa

Blikanasaurus is a genus of sauropodomorph dinosaur from the late Triassic of South Africa. The generic name Blikanasaurus is derived from Greek, meaning "lizard from Blikana". The species name cromptoni is taken from the surname of A.W. "Fuzz" Crompton, an American paleontologist who led numerous field expeditions in Elliot Formation outcrop localities in South Africa. Blikanasaurus is only known from partial hindlimb bones that were recovered from the lower Elliot Formation (LEF) in the Eastern Cape.

== History of discovery ==
Blikanasaurus was first discovered by a partial hindlimb (epipodium and pes) found in the lower Elliot Formation (LEF) at the foot of Blikana mountain in Herschel, Eastern Cape of South Africa in c. 1965. In the early 2000s, a second specimen - consisting of only a right metatarsal - was recovered from lower Elliot Formation deposits on the farm, Damplaats, in Ladybrand of the eastern Free State. A possible ilium that has been attributed to Blikanasaurus was found recently, although its attribution to Blikanasaurus remains to be confirmed.

== Description ==
As the two known Blikanasaurus specimens are extremely incomplete, very little is understood of this sauropodomorph taxon. The only information that has been deduced is from the bones of its hindlimb anatomy, which are heavily built. This suggests that Blikanasaurus was thickly set and robust.

== Classification ==
Due to its robust build, Blikanasaurus is hypothesized to have been an obligate quadruped, unlike what is characteristic of more basal sauropodomorphs. Due to this feature, Blikanasaurus was thought initially to be a basal sauropod. Blikanasaurus is now considered to be a basal sauropodomorph; however, due to the lack of complete specimens, little remains known about this enigmatic taxon. Some paleontologists claimed a case to group Blikanasaurus within the family Blikanasauridae, a family named by Galton and van Heerden in 1985, however, this family has not been formally accepted due to it lacking definitive taxa. The cladogram below displays the currently accepted systematics between Blikanasaurus and other sauropodomorphs.

- Sauropodiformes
  - Mussaurus
  - - Aardonyx
    - Sefapanosaurus
    - - - Melanorosauridae
          - Camelotia
          - Melanorosaurus
      - - Sauropoda
          - - Lessemsauridae
              - Antetonitrus
              - - Ingentia
                - Lessemsaurus
          - - Blikanasaurus
            - - Gongxianosaurus
              - - Pulanesaura
                - Gravisauria
