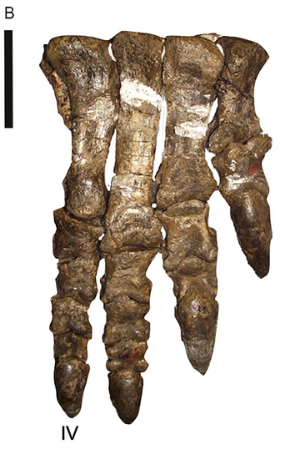
- Pes of K. ellenbergerorum (specimen NMQR1705)

Scientific classification
- Kingdom: Animalia
- Phylum: Chordata
- Class: Reptilia
- Clade: Dinosauria
- Clade: Saurischia
- Clade: †Sauropodomorpha
- Clade: †Massopoda
- Genus: †Kholumolumo; Peyre de Fabrègues & Allain, 2020

Type species
- †Kholumolumo ellenbergerorum Peyre de Fabrègues & Allain, 2020

= Kholumolumo =

Kholumolumo Temporal range: Late Triassic, 210 Ma

Extinct genus of dinosaurs

Kholumolumo (referring to a type of dragon the local Basuto associate with dinosaurs), formerly "Kholumolumosaurus" or "Thotobolosaurus", is an extinct genus of massopodan sauropodomorph dinosaur, which was closely related to Sarahsaurus, from the lower Elliot Formation of Maphutseng, Lesotho. The type species, Kholumolumo ellenbergerorum was formally described in 2020.

== Discovery and naming ==
In 1930, Samuel Motsoane, principal of the Paris Evangelical Mission School at Bethesda in Lesotho, found dispersed dinosaur bones. In 1955, he told this to the protestant missionary Paul Ellenberger. In September 1955, P. Ellenberger and his brother François Ellenberger uncovered a bonebed in the immediate vicinity of a refuse pile a few meters from native huts in the Village of Maphutseng, western Lesotho, in a layer of the Elliot Formation. The location was locally called the Thotobolo ea 'Ma-Beata, the "trash heap of Beata's mother". In November 1955, they were reinforced by the South-African paleontologists Alfred Walter Crompton and Rosalie F. "Griff" Ewer. In 1955, the discovery was reported in the scientific literature. The excavations were continued from February 1956 onwards and at the end of the second field season, the number of pieces had increased to 683, collected from a surface of thirty-five square metres. The Ellenberger brothers briefly described the finds in 1956. In 1957, the fossils were transported to the South African Museum of Cape Town. Delays in their preparation caused a rift between Crompton and the Ellenbergers.

In 1959, P. Ellenberger, F. Ellenberger and the latter's wife Hélène, continued the digs in cooperation with a French team from the Paris Muséum national d'histoire naturelle including Léonard Ginsburg and Jean Fabre. Over two hundred additional pieces were collected. In 1960, eight dinosaur trackways were reported, discovered over a surface of seventy square metres. Three individual tracks were transported to the University of Montpellier but are presently lost. In 1963, additional excavations took place by Paul Ellenberger, Ginsburg, Fabre and Christiane Mendrez. In 1966, François Ellenberger and Ginsburg for the first time described the bones in detail and referred them to Euskelosaurus browni.

In September 1970, the last excavations occurred by Paul Ellenberger, Ginsburg, Fabre and Bernard Battail. As in 1959, the fossils were sent to Paris, bringing the total there to about four hundred. Concluding that it represented a taxon new to science, Paul Ellenberger at first referred to it as "Thotobolosaurus", which means "trash heap lizard", in reference to where the holotype was discovered. Ellenberger in a redescription of the material suggested the species name "Thotobolosaurus mabeatae" in 1970. This name was invalid, however.

In 1996, the species was briefly referred to as "Kholumolumosaurus ellenbergerorum" in François-Xavier Gauffre's unpublished dissertation. This name too, was invalid.

In 2020, the species Kholumolumo ellenbergerorum, a shortened form of one of the original names, was formally named by Claire Peyre de Fabrègues and Ronan Allain. The generic name is the kholumolumo or xodumodumo, a gigantic devouring reptile, sometimes described as a dragon, lizard or crocodile, from the mythology of the Sotho. The Basotho use this word to refer to dinosaurs. The specific name honours the Ellenberger family.

The holotype, MNHN.F.LES381m, was found in a layer of the Lower Elliot Formation dating from the Norian. It consists of a complete right tibia or shinbone. Several other bones in the Paris material were designated as paratypes. All the additional sauropodomorph material from Maphutseng, whether in France or South-Africa, was referred to the species. Only disarticulated bones were found, including little skull material. They represent at least five, probably about ten, individuals.

== Description ==
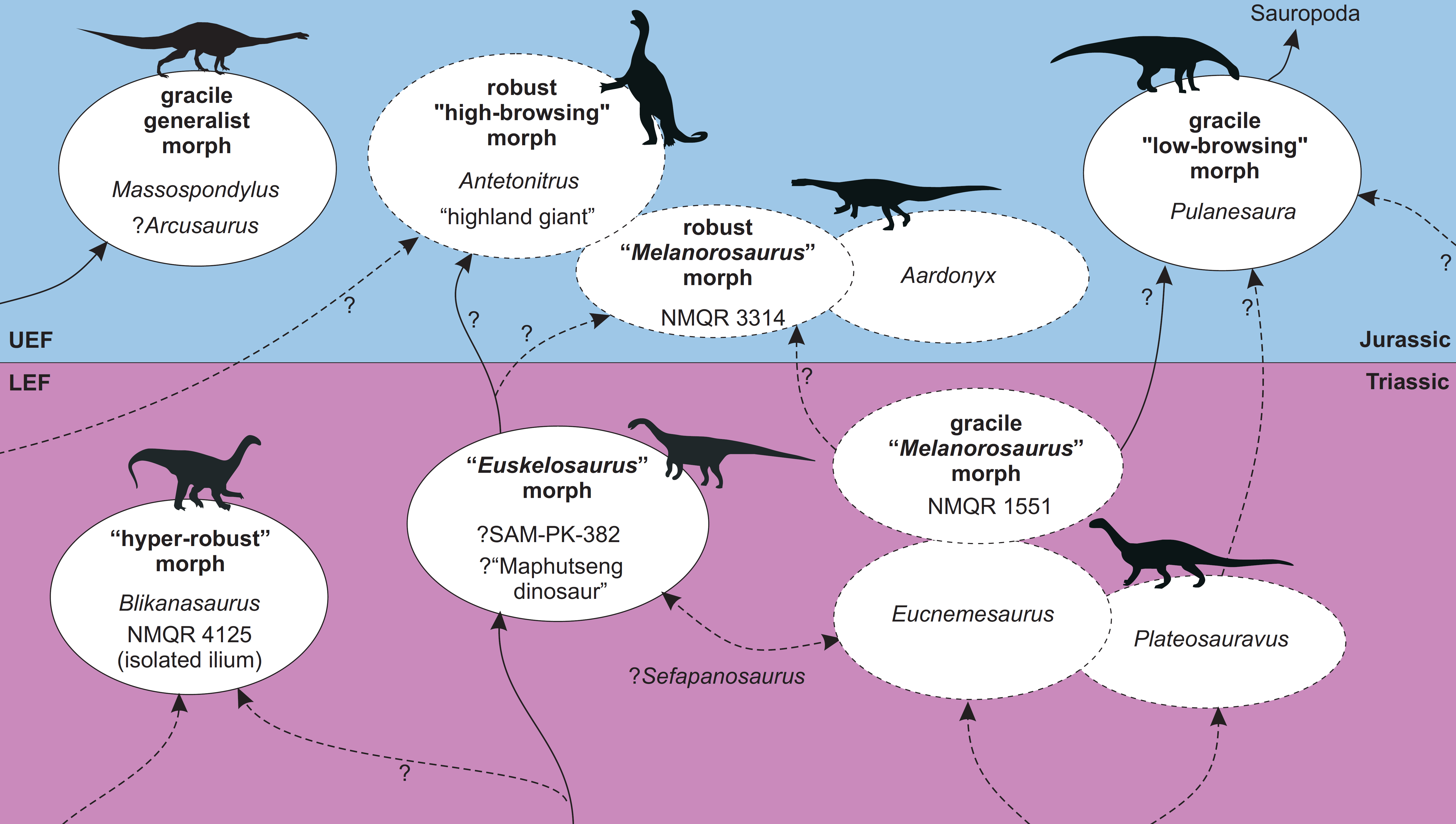
Hypothetical ecomorphotype groupings and population dynamics of the sauropodomorph fauna of the Elliot Formation, Kholumolumo is listed as "Maphutseng dinosaur"

Kholumolumo was a large sauropodomorph, estimated to have reached upwards of 9 metres (30 ft) long. This would have made it one of the largest known animals of the Norian. Its weight has been estimated from its thighbone circumference. If it was bipedal, which the describing authors thought likely, a weight is indicated of 1754 kilogrammes. A quadrupedal animal could have weighed 3963 kilogrammes.

Since no complete skeletons of Kholumolumo have been discovered, much of what is known about its physical appearance and diet has to be inferred from its close relatives. Most likely it would be a herbivore that looked similar to dinosaurs such as Sarahsaurus.

The holotype shows a unique combination of traits that in themselves are not unique. The shinbone is very short and robust, its circumference measuring 53% of its length: in all other known non-sauropod Sauropodomorpha this ratio is lower than 0.49, with the exception of Antetonitrus and Blikanasaurus. The shinbone shaft tapers to below, both seen from the inside as viewed from the outside. The shinbone shaft has a straight front and rear edge, different from Antetonitrus.
