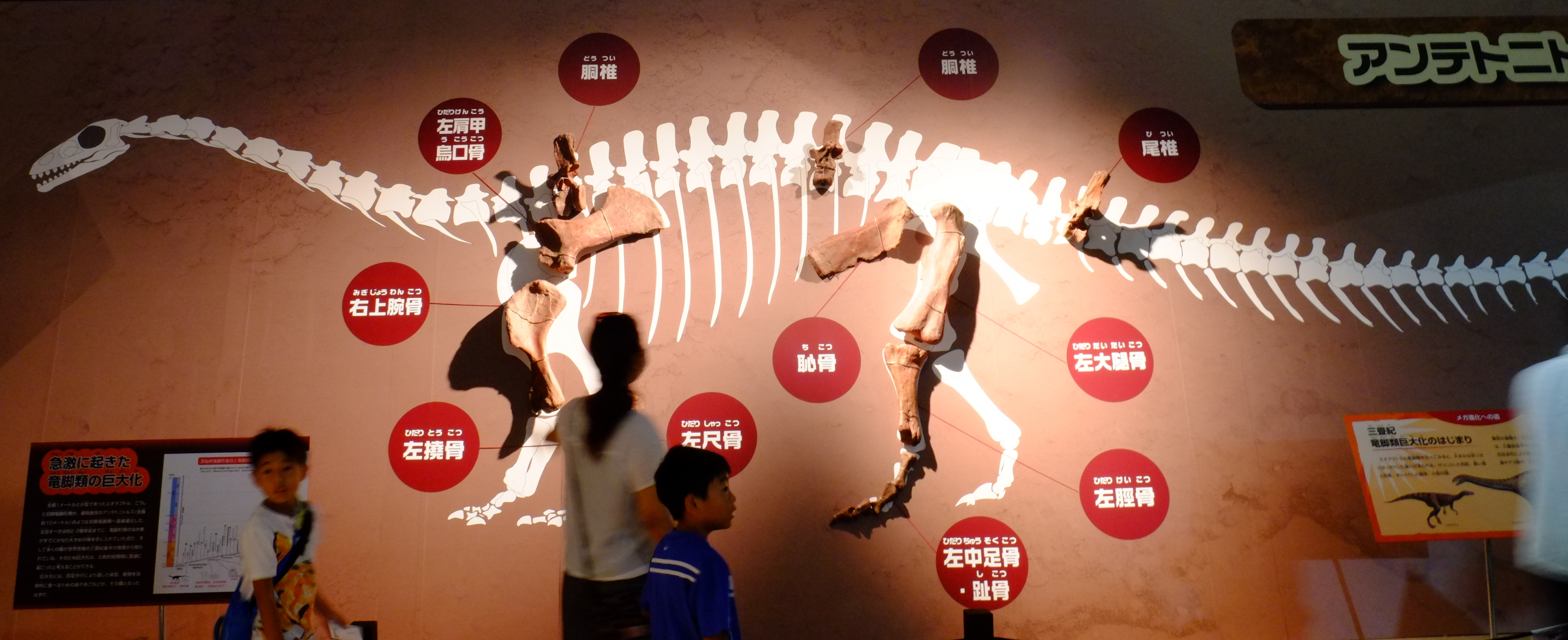
- Holotype

Scientific classification
- Kingdom: Animalia
- Phylum: Chordata
- Class: Reptilia
- Clade: Dinosauria
- Clade: Saurischia
- Clade: †Sauropodomorpha
- Clade: †Sauropoda
- Family: †Lessemsauridae
- Genus: †Antetonitrus
- Species: †A. ingenipes

Binomial name
- †Antetonitrus ingenipes Yates & Kitching, 2003

= Antetonitrus =

Antetonitrus Temporal range: Early Jurassic, Hettangian

Sauropodiform dinosaur genus from Early Jurassic South Africa

Antetonitrus is a genus of sauropodiform dinosaur found in the Early Jurassic Elliot Formation of South Africa. The only species is Antetonitrus ingenipes. Sometimes considered a basal sauropod, it is crucial for the understanding of the origin and early evolution of this group. It was a quadrupedal herbivore, like its later relatives, but shows primitive adaptations to use the forelimbs for grasping, instead of purely for weight support.

== Discovery and naming ==
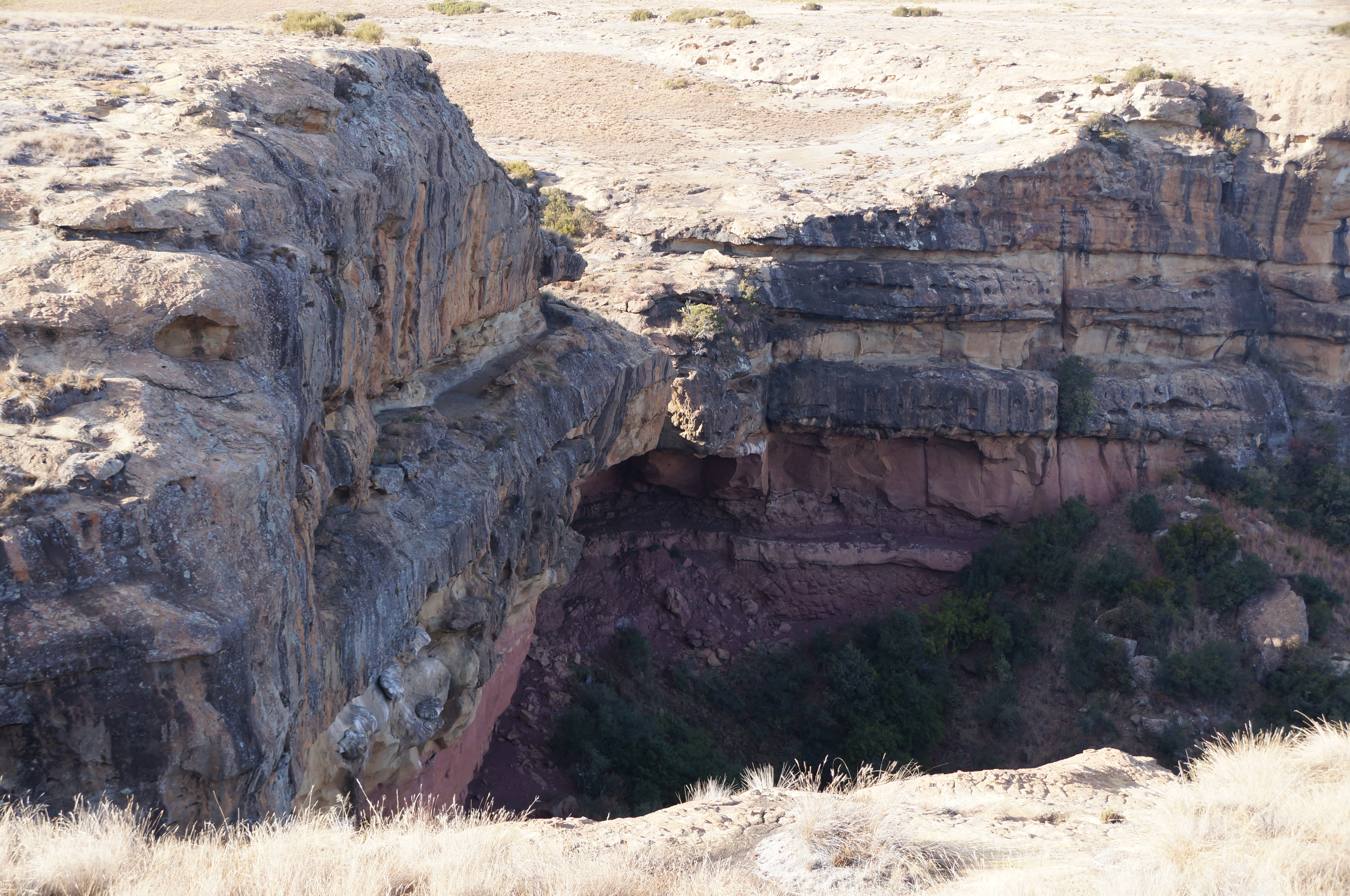
The Elliot Formation, where remains of Antetonitrus were discovered

Adam Yates, an Australian expert on early sauropodomorphs, named Antetonitrus in a 2003 report co-authored by South African James Kitching. The name is derived from the Latin ante- ("before") and tonitrus ("thunder"), which refers to its existence, before other known sauropods, specifically Brontosaurus ("thunder lizard"). The one known species of Antetonitrus is called A. ingenipes, from the Latin ingens ("massive") and pes ("foot"), because it shows the beginning of the development of feet designed solely to support weight.

The fossils now known as Antetonitrus were discovered by Kitching in 1981 in the Free State of South Africa, and were stored in the Bernard Price Institute where they were labeled as Euskelosaurus. Yates recognized them as a separate taxon and published a description several years later. The holotype, or original specimen, consists of several vertebrae and numerous bones from both forelimb and hind limb, all presumed to be from one individual. Five more limb bones from another smaller individual were also referred to the genus.

== Description ==
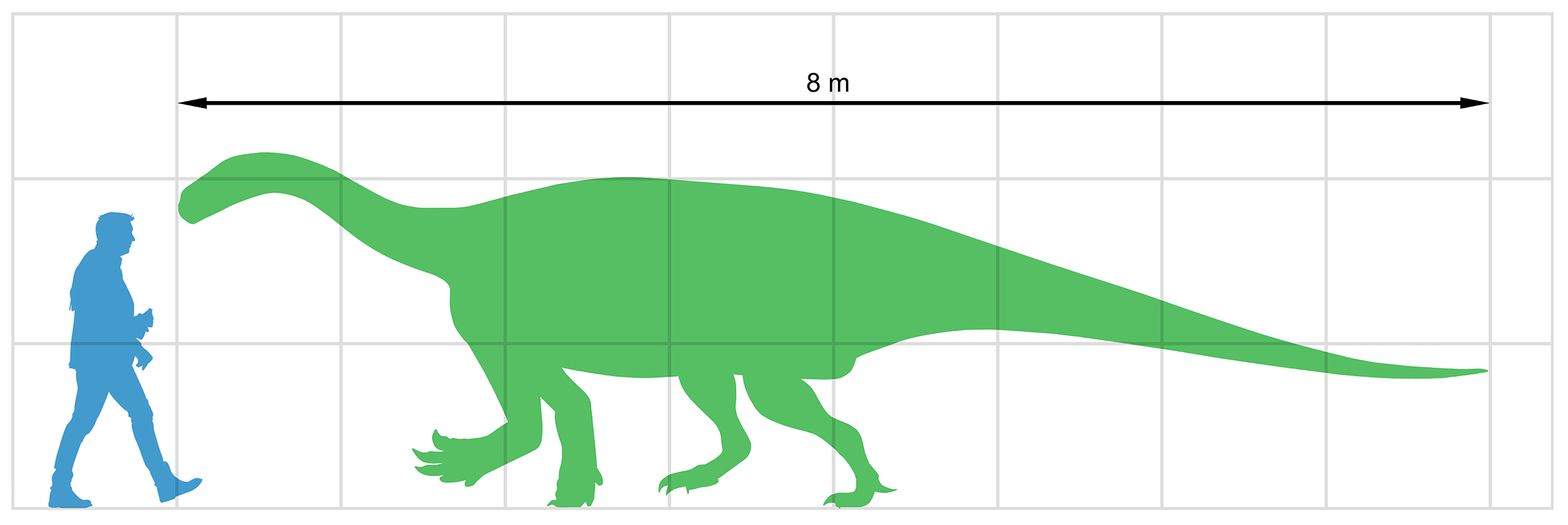
Size of Antetonitrus compared to a human

The holotype specimen may have measured 8–10 metres (26–33 ft) in length, 1.5–2 metres (4.9–6.6 ft) in hip height and 5.6 metric tons (6.2 short tons) in body mass. However, the neural arches of the vertebrae were not fused with the centra, indicating that this individual perhaps was not fully grown.

Antetonitrus shows several features which appear to be similar to those of later sauropods, but still retains some primitive features. Unlike most of its smaller and more lightly built ancestors, Antetonitrus was primarily quadrupedal. Like sauropods, its forelimbs were much longer relative to its hind legs than earlier animals, while the metatarsus was shortened. However, the first digit of the hand, also called the "thumb" or pollex, was still twisted and flexible, capable of grasping against the hand. In more derived sauropods, the wrist bones are large and thick, arranged in such a way as to lock the hand into a permanently pronated position for full-time weight support, and the hand is incapable of grasping.

Antetonitrus already shows adaptations for an increasing body size as seen in all later sauropods: The wrist bones were broader and thicker to support more weight, whereas the femur was elliptical in cross section. The vertebrae bear high neural spines and well developed hyposphene-hypantrum articulations which add rigidity to the trunk. The first toe of the hind foot already bears a large claw longer than the first metatarsal; however, this claw was not sickle shaped as seen in later sauropods. The femur was slightly sigmoidal (S-curved) in lateral view rather than straight as in other sauropods.

Despite being a true sauropod, the long bone development of Antetonitrus was more characteristic of basal sauropodomorphs, with subadults possessing, as derived sauropods do, highly vascularised fibrolamellar bone throughout their cortices, but with intermittent growth lines as seen in more basal sauropodomorphs instead of the absence of growth lines or presence of growth lines exclusively in the outer circumferential layer.

== Classification ==
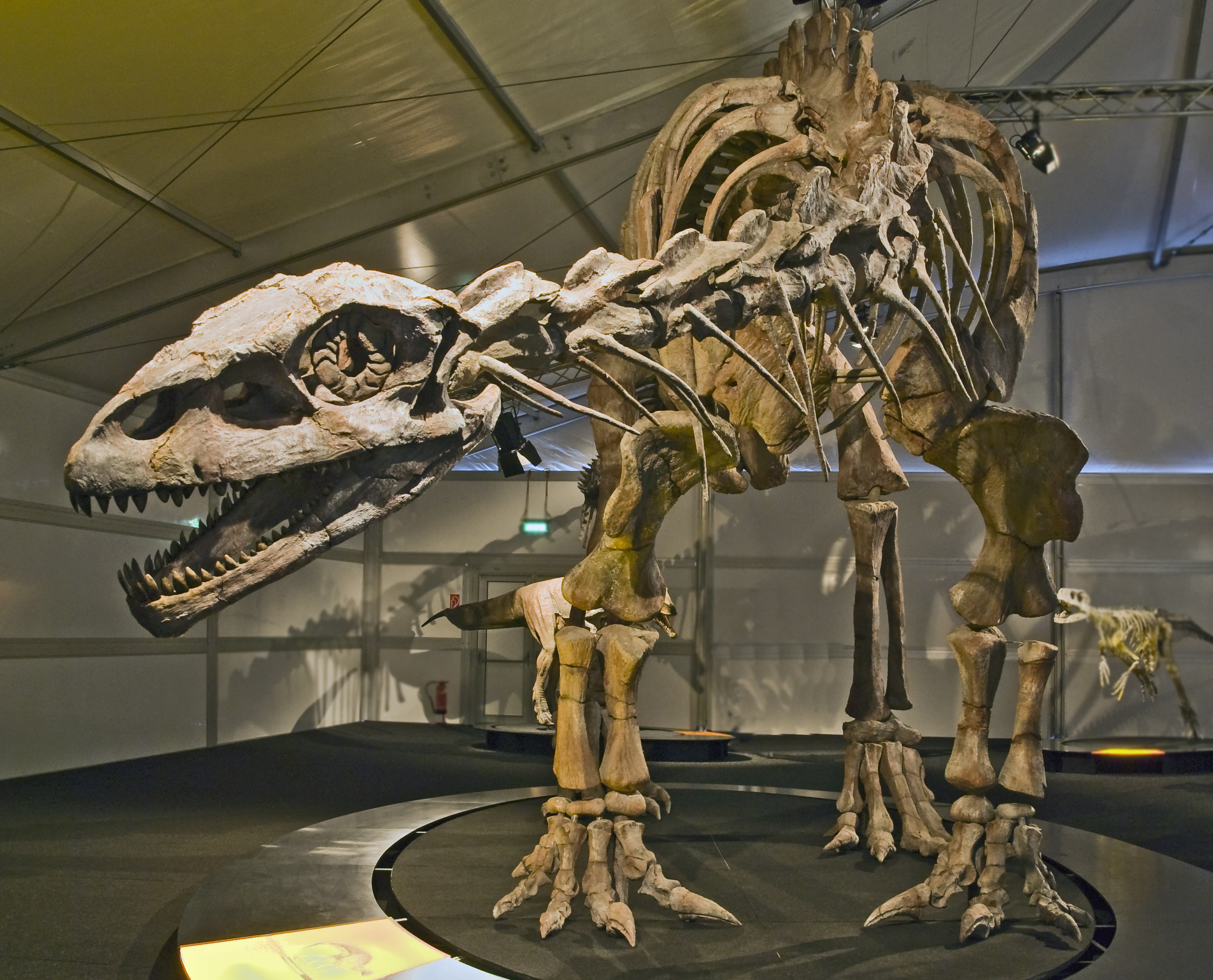
Skeletal reconstruction of Lessemsaurus, a closely related genus of basal sauropod

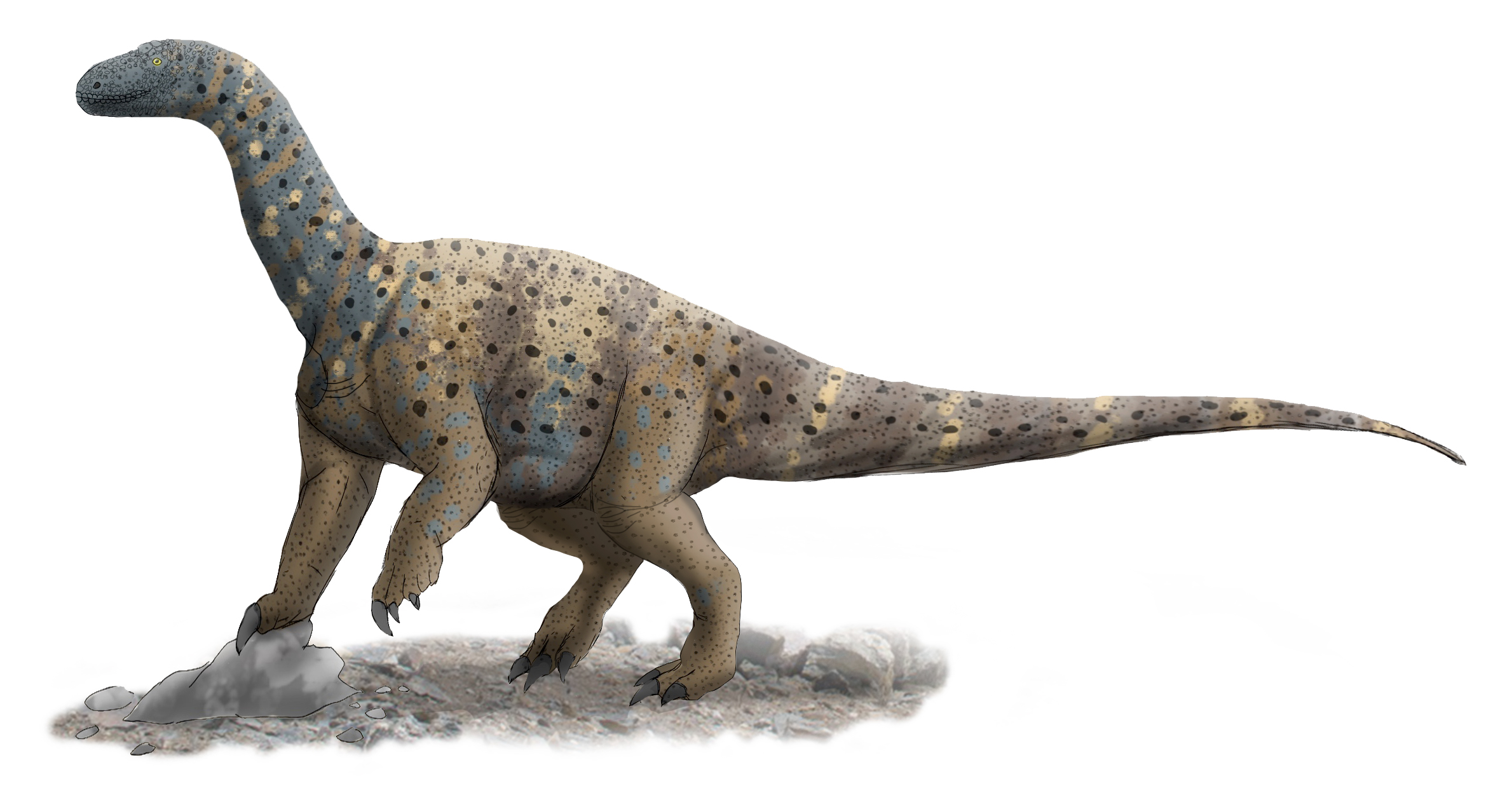
Restoration of Antetonitrus

A cladistic analysis by Yates and Kitching recognizes Antetonitrus as a basal sauropod, occupying a position between more derived animals such as Isanosaurus or Vulcanodon, and more basal sauropods like Melanorosaurus. The back vertebrae are extremely similar to Lessemsaurus from South America, while the limb bones are similar to Blikanasaurus, another stocky early sauropod from South Africa. However, these animals were not included in a cladistic analysis with Antetonitrus because they are poorly known. Apaldetti et al. (2018) erected Lessemsauridae, a clade containing Antetonitrus, Lessemsaurus and Ingentia. Their cladogram is reproduced below:

- Sauropodiformes
  - Mussaurus
  - - Aardonyx
    - Sefapanosaurus
    - - - Melanorosauridae
          - Camelotia
          - Melanorosaurus
      - - Sauropoda
          - - Lessemsauridae
              - Antetonitrus
              - - Ingentia
                - Lessemsaurus
          - - Blikanasaurus
            - - Gongxianosaurus
              - - Pulanesaura
                - Gravisauria

The following cladogram shows the position of Antetonitrus within Massopoda, according to Oliver W. M. Rauhut and colleagues, 2020:

- Massopoda
  - - Eucnemesaurus
    - Riojasaurus
  - - Sarahsaurus
    - - Massospondylidae
        - - Yunnanosaurus
          - - Jingshanosaurus
            - Seitaad
        - - - Coloradisaurus
            - - Glacialisaurus
              - Lufengosaurus
          - - Massospondylus
            - - Adeopapposaurus
              - Leyesaurus
      - Sauropodiformes
        - Xingxiulong
        - - - Anchisaurus
            - Leonerasaurus
          - - Mussaurus
            - - Aardonyx
              - - Sefapanosaurus
                - - Meroktenos
                  - - Melanorosaurus
                    - - Camelotia
                      - - - Lessemsaurus
                          - - Antetonitrus
                            - Ingentia
                        - - Blikanasaurus
                          - - Pulanesaura
                            - - Gongxianosaurus
                              - - Schleitheimia
                                - - Isanosaurus
                                  - - Tazoudasaurus
                                    - Sauropoda

== Paleogeography ==
While Antetonitrus is not the earliest sauropod from a phylogenetic standpoint, it is currently one of the oldest known sauropod chronologically, or rather tied for that distinction with other early sauropods from the same formation, like Melanorosaurus and Blikanasaurus. Fossils of these animals were recovered from the Elliot Formation. Initially it was thought to have been recovered from the Lower Elliot Formation which dates to the Norian stage of the Late Triassic, or approximately 221 to 210 million years ago. Later studies indicate that it was actually recovered from the Early Jurassic Upper Elliot Formation. Before Antetonitrus and the other animals recovered from the Elliot Formation were recognized as sauropods, the oldest known sauropod had been Isanosaurus from the Rhaetian stage of Thailand.

Early sauropods and their sauropodomorph relatives were found around the world as all of the continents were at the time united into the single supercontinent, Pangaea, which made dispersal across the entire terrestrial world possible.
