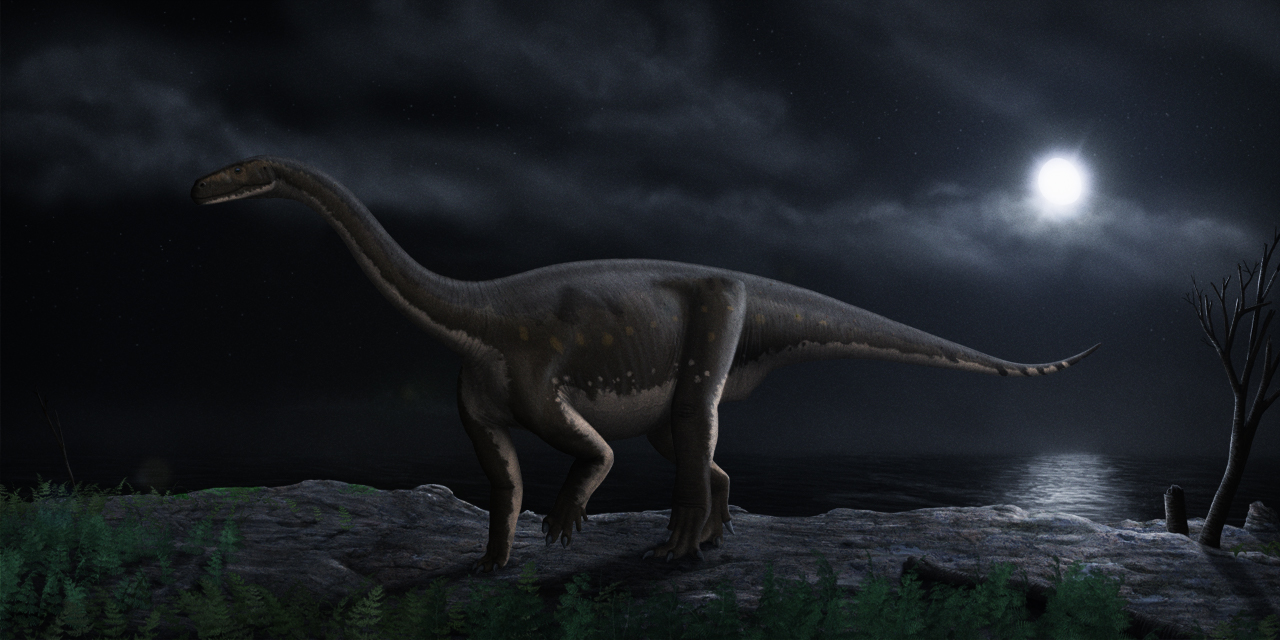
- Life depiction of Melanorosaurus

Scientific classification
- Kingdom: Animalia
- Phylum: Chordata
- Class: Reptilia
- Clade: Dinosauria
- Clade: Saurischia
- Clade: †Sauropodomorpha
- Clade: †Anchisauria
- Family: †Melanorosauridae von Huene, 1929

Genera
- †Camelotia?; †Melanorosaurus

= Melanorosauridae =

Melanorosaurids Temporal range: Triassic-Jurassic, 228–189.6 Ma

Extinct family of dinosaurs

The Melanorosauridae were a family of sauropodomorph dinosaurs which lived during the Late Triassic and Early Jurassic. The name Melanorosauridae was coined by Friedrich von Huene in 1929. Huene assigned several families of dinosaurs to the infraorder "Prosauropoda": the Anchisauridae, the Plateosauridae, the Thecodontosauridae, and the Melanorosauridae. Since then, these families have undergone numerous revisions. Galton and Upchurch (2004) considered Camelotia, Lessemsaurus, and Melanorosaurus members of the family Melanorosauridae. A more recent study by Yates (2007) indicates that the melanorosaurids were instead early sauropods.

Subsequent studies have either considered Melanorosaurus and Camelotia as closely related, or have recovered them as unrelated.
