= Ingentia =

Ingentia Temporal range: Late Triassic, Rhaetian

Scientific classification
- Kingdom: Animalia
- Phylum: Chordata
- Class: Reptilia
- Clade: Dinosauria
- Clade: Saurischia
- Clade: †Sauropodomorpha
- Clade: †Sauropoda
- Family: †Lessemsauridae
- Genus: †Ingentia; Apaldetti et al., 2018
- Species: †I. prima

Binomial name
- †Ingentia prima Apaldetti et al., 2018

Sauropod dinosaur genus from Late Triassic Argentina

Ingentia is a genus of early sauropodiform dinosaur, sometimes considered a basal sauropod, from the Late Triassic (late Norian-Rhaetian) of Argentina. The type specimen of Ingentia, PVSJ 1086, was discovered in the Quebrada del Barro Formation of northwestern Argentina. It was described in 2018 by Cecilia Apaldetti, Ricardo Nestor Martínez, Ignacio Alejandro Cerda, Diego Pol and Oscar Alcober who named the type and only species Ingentia prima, meaning "first huge one", as the taxon was one of the first very large sauropodomorphs to evolve, along with its close relative Lessemsaurus. A second specimen, PVSJ 1087, was referred, containing five tail vertebrae, both ulnae and radii, a left calfbone and a right foot.

== Classification ==
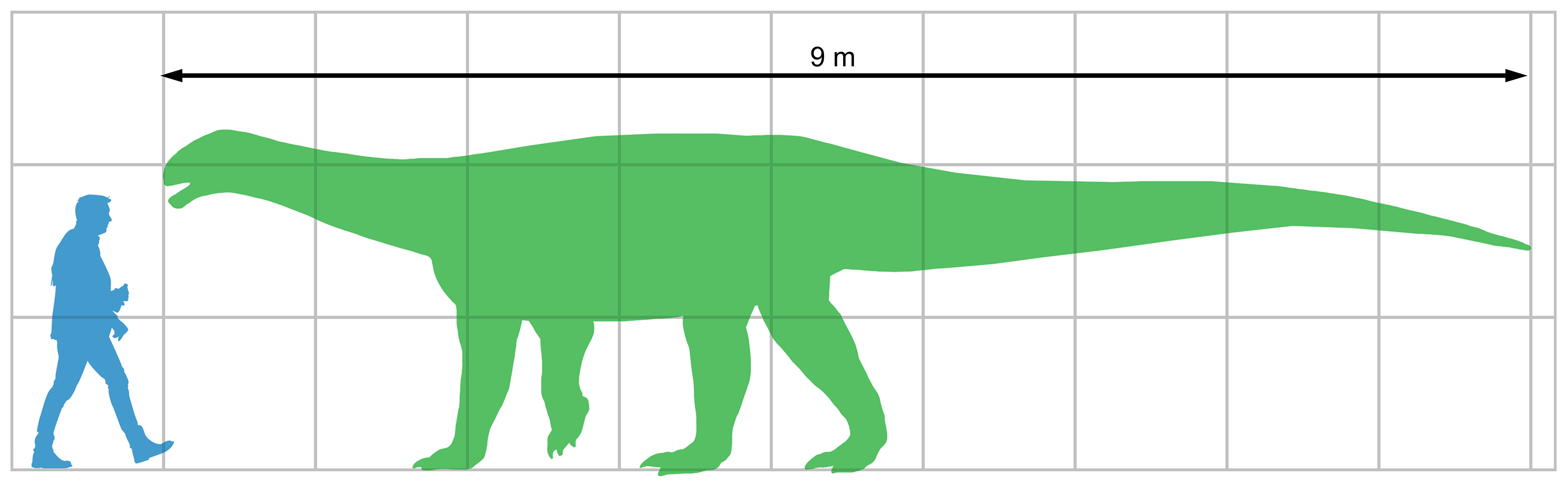
Size comparison between Ingentia and a human

A phylogenetic analysis performed by Apaldetti et al. found a new clade uniting Ingentia, Lessemsaurus and Antetonitrus, which they named Lessemsauridae. Like other lessemsaurids, Ingentia has highly pneumatic and very antero-posteriorly short but tall robust cervical vertebrae, a very expanded distal scapula blade, and arms that are relatively bent but capable of supporting the torso. Depending on the definition of Sauropoda, the clade is either the oldest sauropod taxon, or the sister taxon of the clade Sauropoda. The phylogenetic analysis is shown below:

- Sauropodiformes
  - Mussaurus
  - - Aardonyx
    - Sefapanosaurus
    - - - Melanorosauridae
          - Camelotia
          - Melanorosaurus
      - - Sauropoda
          - - Lessemsauridae
              - Antetonitrus
              - - Ingentia
                - Lessemsaurus
          - - Blikanasaurus
            - - Gongxianosaurus
              - - Pulanesaura
                - Gravisauria

== See also ==
- 2018 in paleontology
