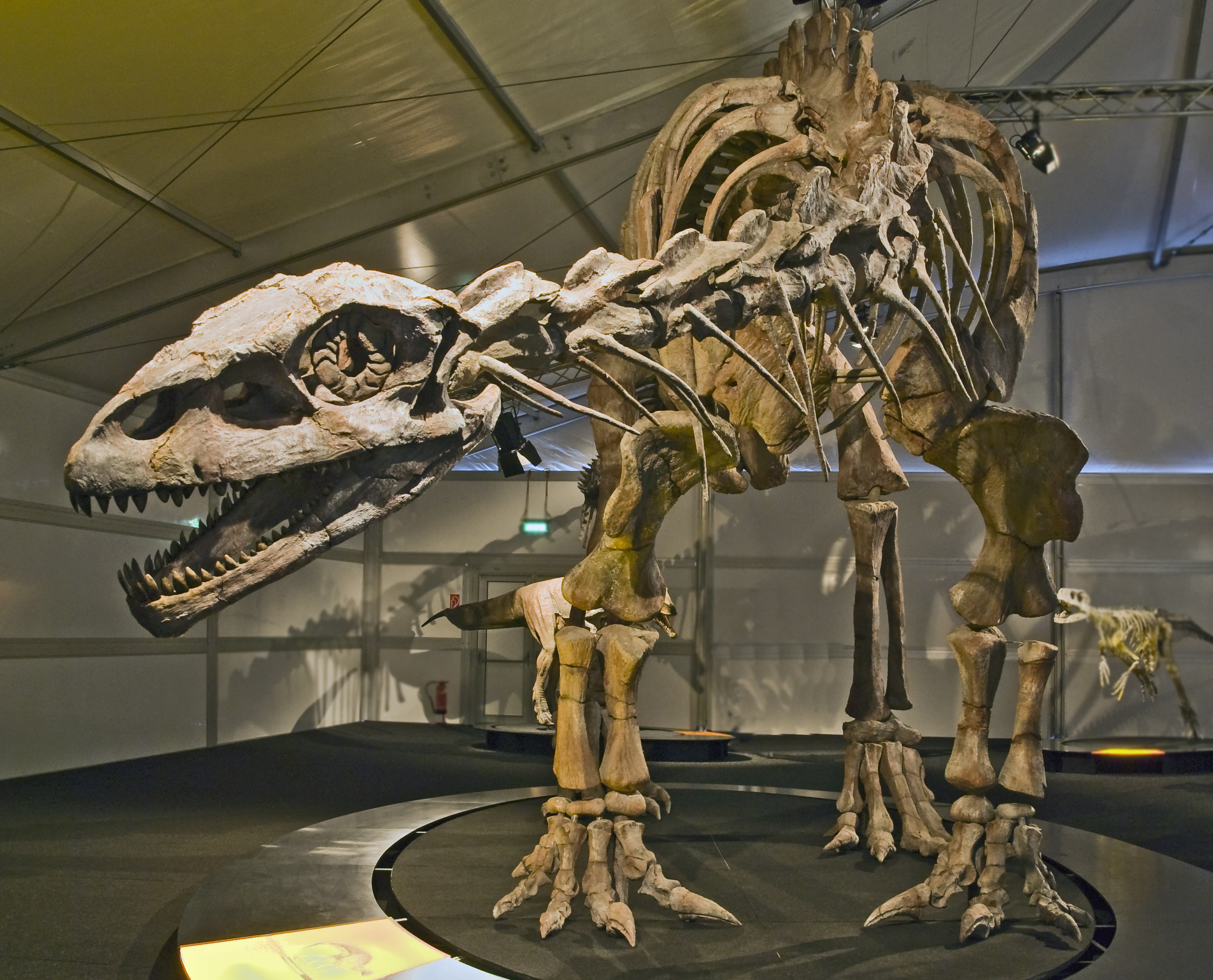
- Skeletal mount of Lessemsaurus

Scientific classification
- Kingdom: Animalia
- Phylum: Chordata
- Class: Reptilia
- Clade: Dinosauria
- Clade: Saurischia
- Clade: †Sauropodomorpha
- Clade: †Sauropoda
- Family: †Lessemsauridae; Apaldetti et al., 2018

Genera
- †Antetonitrus; †Ingentia; †Kholumolumo?; †Ledumahadi; †Lessemsaurus; †Meroktenos?

= Lessemsauridae =

Lessemsaurids Temporal range: Late Triassic-Early Jurassic, 218–193 Ma

Extinct clade of dinosaurs

Lessemsauridae is a clade (family) of early sauropodiform dinosaurs that lived in the Triassic and Jurassic of Argentina, South Africa and possibly Lesotho. A phylogenetic analysis performed by Apaldetti and colleagues in 2018 recovered a new clade of sauropodiforms uniting Lessemsaurus, Antetonitrus, and Ingentia which they named Lessemsauridae. It is a node-based taxon, defined as all descendants of the most recent common ancestor of Lessemsaurus sauropoides and Antetonitrus ingenipes. Depending on the definition of Sauropoda, Lessemsauridae is either one of the most basal sauropod taxa, or a sister taxon of Sauropoda. An additional member of the clade was named later in 2018, Ledumahadi. A 2021 study by Pol and colleagues also assigned the genera Kholumolumo and Meroktenos to the group.

== Description ==
Lessemsaurids were quadrupeds. Unlike later sauropods, which had columnar limbs, the forelimbs of lessemsaurids were flexed. Sauropodomorph trackways have been found with widely-spaced front feet, indicating they were made by a trackmaker with flexed forelimbs as in lessemsaurids.

Lessemsaurids could reach large sizes, with Lessemsaurus estimated to have reached a mass of 7 tonnes and the later Ledumahadi estimated to have reached a mass of 12 tonnes.

They had highly pneumatic cervical and dorsal vertebrae, very antero-posteriorly short but tall cervical vertebrae, robust cervicals, a very expanded distal scapula blade, and upright arms.

== Evolution and biogeography ==
Lessemsaurids first appeared during the middle Norian age of the Triassic. A specimen of an unnamed lessemsaurid from the Elliot Formation of South Africa probably dates to approximately 218 million years ago. Lessemsaurus is a member of the La Esquina Local Fauna, which probably dates to at least 213 million years ago. Antetonitrus and Ledumahadi are found in the Upper Elliot Formation, which dates to the Hettangian and Sinemurian ages of the Jurassic. Lessemsaurids are known from South Africa and Argentina.
