= Gongxianosaurus =

Gongxianosaurus Temporal range: Sinemurian-Pliensbachian, 199–185 Ma

Scientific classification
- Kingdom: Animalia
- Phylum: Chordata
- Class: Reptilia
- Clade: Dinosauria
- Clade: Saurischia
- Clade: †Sauropodomorpha
- Clade: †Sauropoda
- Genus: †Gongxianosaurus
- Species: †G. shibeiensis

Binomial name
- †Gongxianosaurus shibeiensis He et al., 1998

Synonyms
- "Yibinosaurus zhoui"? Anonymous (Ouyang), 2001 vide Ouyang, 2003

Extinct genus of dinosaurs

Gongxianosaurus is a genus of basal sauropod dinosaur from the early Jurassic Period (Sinemurian-Pliensbachian stage). The only species is Gongxianosaurus shibeiensis. Based on four fragmentary to complete specimens found in the Ziliujing Formation, China (Sichuan Province), it is one of the most completely known early sauropods. The skeleton is known in large part, missing both the hand and the majority of the skull. Gongxianosaurus was firstly named and described in a short note published in 1998; however, a comprehensive description has yet to be published. Gongxianosaurus shibeiensis was named for the place it was found, near the village Shibei in Gong County (珙县; Pinyin: Gǒng Xiàn).

== Description ==
Gongxianosaurus may have reached 14 metres (46 ft) in length. Like other sauropods, it moved quadrupedally (on four legs), as indicated by the elongated fore limbs that reached 70 to 75% of hind limb length. The pedal phalanges were short and robust, as typical for sauropods. The pedal phalangeal formula, counting the number of phalanges for each digit starting from the innermost, was 2-3-4-5-1. All but the outermost digit ended in claws. Unlike in other sauropods, pleurocoels (deep lateral excavations of the vertebrae) were absent; thus, the vertebrae would have been quite massive. The sacrum was made of three fused sacral vertebrae, fewer than in later sauropods. The chevrons were unbifurcated.

An important characteristic of sauropod limbs is their reduced ossification – the tendency to replace bone by cartilage. Gongxianosaurus is the only known sauropod with ossified distal tarsals. Thus, either Gongxianosaurus was one of the basalmost sauropods, or ossified distal tarsals were present in other early sauropods but are simply not preserved due to the fragmentation of the specimens.

== Classification ==
Because the fossils are not fully described yet, available character information that can be used in cladistic analyses is limited. Thus, only few cladistical analyses have incorporated Gongxianosaurus. A recent analysis by Apaldetti et al. (2011) suggests that Gongxianosaurus was more basal than Vulcanodon, Tazoudasaurus and Isanosaurus, but more derived than the early sauropods Antetonitrus, Lessemsaurus, Blikanasaurus, Camelotia and Melanorosaurus.

== Discovery ==
Gongxianosaurus fossils were found near the village of Shibei (Sichuan province) in purple mudstones pertaining to the Ziliujing Formation (Dongyuemiao Member). These rocks were considered to be Toarcian in age (182.7 to 174.1 mya), but then the Sinemurian-Pliensbachian boundary event (192.9 Ma) was recorded on the top, while lower parts of this member are of Earliest Sinemurian age (around 199 Ma). Thus, Gongxianosaurus, unlike it was previously thought, is geologically coeval with the "prosauropod" Lufengosaurus but older than the basal sauropod Shunosaurus.

- Sauropoda
  - Melanorosaurus
  - Camelotia
  - Blikanasaurus
  - unnamed
    - Lessemsaurus
    - Antetonitrus
  - - Gongxianosaurus
    - Gravisauria
      - Vulcanodon
      - Tazoudasaurus
      - Isanosaurus
      - Eusauropoda

Basal Sauropod phylogeny simplified after Apaldetti et al. (2011).

The fossils were found in May 1997 during a geological exploration. Excavation started in the same month and led to the recovery of a wealth of fossils in an area of approximately 200 square meters. While most fossils pertain to a new sauropod genus, remains of theropods have also been found. The sauropod material includes four fragmentary to complete individuals similar in size, together encompassing most of the skeleton, though hand and skull bones were not found except a premaxilla and teeth. In 1998, the sauropod material was briefly described as a new genus and species, Gongxianosaurus shibeiensis, in a preliminary note by palaeontologists led by He Xinlu. A more detailed description was announced, noting that excavation was still in progress while the paper was published. In 2000, a second short description was published by Luo Yaonan and Wang Changsheng, also presenting Gongxianosaurus as a new sauropod and without mentioning the first description that was published two years before. Also, much of the information published by Luo and Wang was already published by He and colleagues.

Luo and Wang suggest that several bones may not pertain to the type species Gongxianosaurus shibeiensis but to a second species of Gongxianosaurus. Those remains were informally placed within the separate genus and species "Yibinosaurus zhoui" in 2001 and 2003 respectively by Ouyang Hui.

The holotype of Gongxianosaurus was kept in situ and a protective exhibition hall was built over it. The exhibition hall subsequently collapsed, and the specimen was most likely destroyed.
