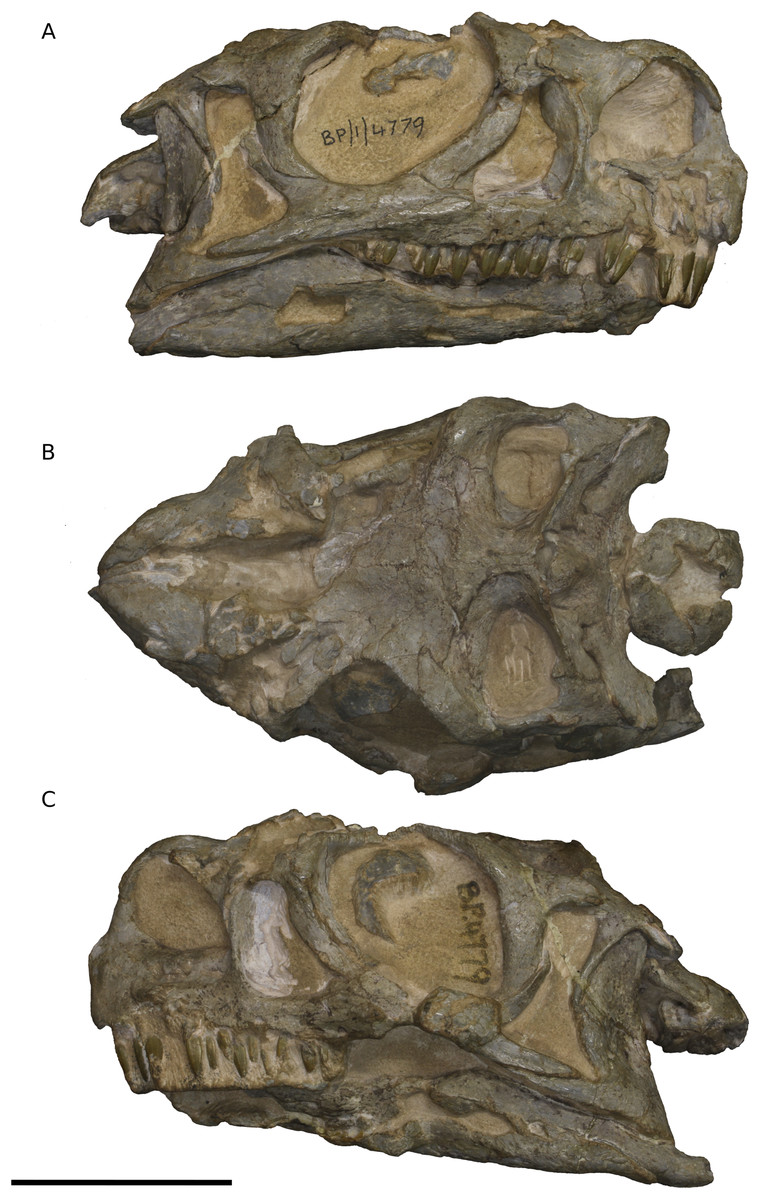
- Holotype skull

Scientific classification
- Kingdom: Animalia
- Phylum: Chordata
- Class: Reptilia
- Clade: Dinosauria
- Clade: Saurischia
- Clade: †Sauropodomorpha
- Family: †Massospondylidae
- Genus: †Ngwevu; Chapelle et al., 2019
- Species: †N. intloko

Binomial name
- †Ngwevu intloko Chapelle et al., 2019

= Ngwevu =

Ngwevu Temporal range: Early Jurassic Pliensbachian–Toarcian

Sauropodomorph dinosaur genus from Early Jurassic South Africa

Ngwevu is a genus of massospondylid sauropodomorph dinosaur from the Lower Jurassic of South Africa. The genus contains one species, Ngwevu intloko.

== Discovery and naming ==
The genus Ngwevu is known from only one specimen, BP/1/4779, which is stored in the Environmental Studies Institute of the University of the Witwatersrand, in Johannesburg, South Africa. The holotype specimen was discovered in 1978 by James William Kitching in the Tevrede Farm, located in Fouriesburg district, South Africa. The strata which preserved the specimen was located in the Clarens Formation, which is Pliensbachian-early Toarcian in age. The specimen was initially considered a specimen of the genus Massospondylus but in 2019 was designated as a new genus and species Ngwevu ntloko (Xhosa pronunciation: [ᵑɡ̊ʷe̤ːv̥ṳ]; directly from Xhosa 'ngwevu' and 'intloko' meaning "grey skull").

== Description ==
Ngwevu can be distinguished from other sauropodomorphs based on a unique combination of 16 traits, including one unique feature: a ridge on the lateral surface of the backside of the jugal. Previously, the specimen was noted to share some different traits compared to other Massospondylus specimens but the differences were considered a result of deformation. In the description of the new genus, it was revealed that these differences cannot be attributed to deformation, and in fact the specimen is well intact. Another hypothesis presumed the differences found in Ngwevu could be attributed to a less advanced ontogenetic stage, with some paleontologists considering it to be a younger specimen of Massospondylus. However, histological study of the holotype of Ngwevu suggests it was an adult (about 10 years old) when it fossilized, rejecting this hypothesis as well. The describing authors of Ngwevu also noted that Ngwevu was proportionately more robust than specimens of Massospondylus.

== Phylogeny ==
Despite the fact that Ngwevu could be distinguished from Massospondylus, there are several shared features between the two genera. A phylogenetic analysis conducted in the describing paper corroborates this, placing Ngwevu intloko in the Massospondylidae. A portion of the analysis is reproduced below.

- Massopoda
  - Anchisaurus
  - - - Jingshanosaurus
      - Seitaad
    - - Massospondylidae
        - Massospondylus carinatus BP/1/5241
        - Massospondylus carinatus BP/1/4934
        - - - Adeopapposaurus mognai
            - Leyesaurus marayensis
          - - Ignavusaurus rachelis
            - Sarahsaurus aurifontanalis
        - - Coloradisaurus brevis
          - Massospondylus kaalae
          - - Lufengosaurus huenei
            - Ngwevu intloko
      - Sauropodiformes

== Paleobiology ==
The snout of Ngwevu is wider than that of Massospondylus carninatus, and the describing authors propose that it signifies a more generalist rather than selective diet. The holotype's robust jaw and skull features, including a broad palate and short snout, may have given it a stronger bite than M. carinatus, suggesting niche partitioning between these two species.
