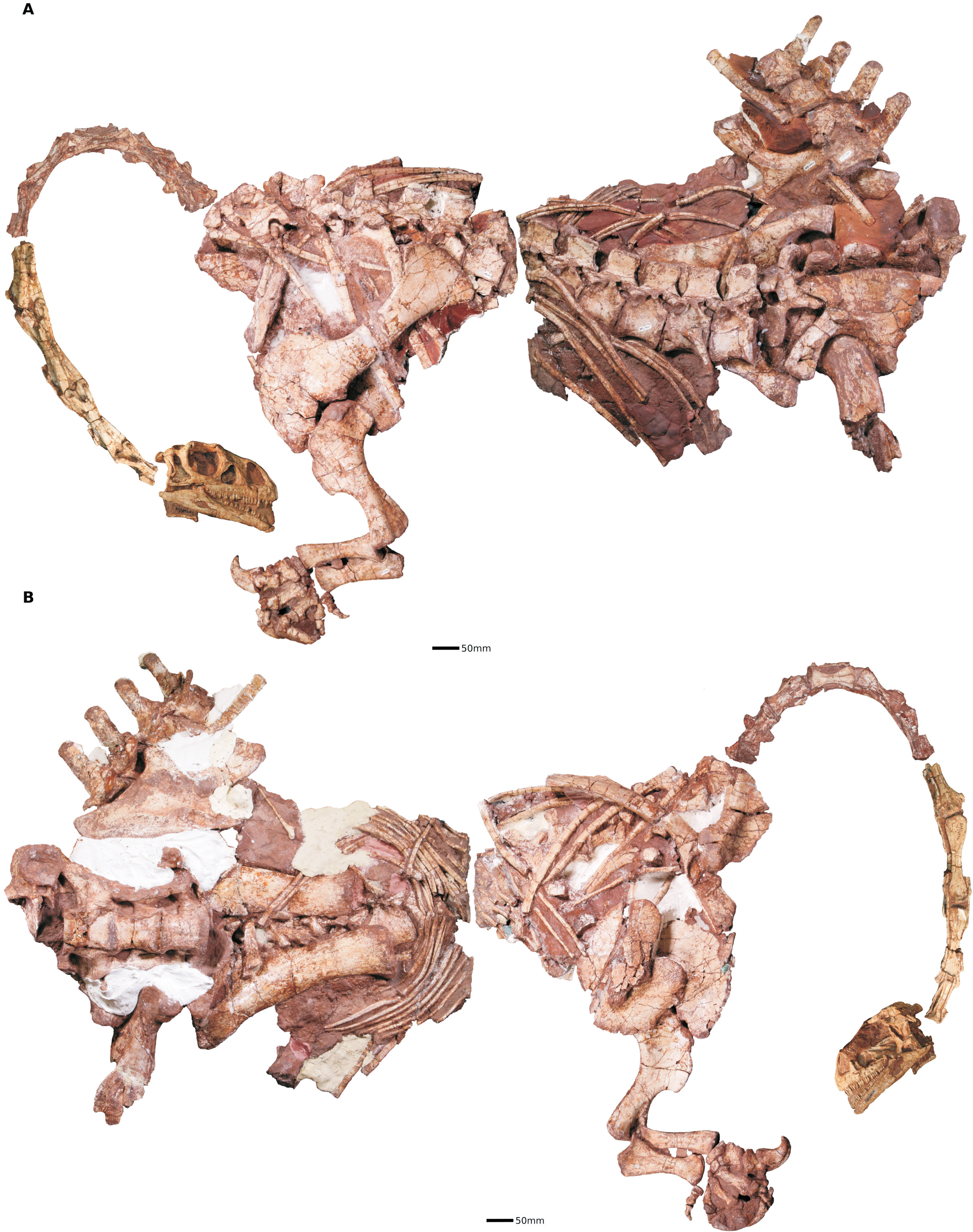
- Neotype skeleton shown from the left (above) and right side

Scientific classification
- Kingdom: Animalia
- Phylum: Chordata
- Class: Reptilia
- Clade: Dinosauria
- Clade: Saurischia
- Clade: †Sauropodomorpha
- Clade: †Bagualosauria
- Clade: †Plateosauria
- Clade: †Massopoda
- Family: †Massospondylidae
- Genus: †Massospondylus; Owen, 1854

Species
- †M. carinatus Owen, 1854 (type); †M. kaalae Barrett, 2009

= Massospondylus =

Massospondylus Temporal range: Early Jurassic, Hettangian–Pliensbachian

Sauropodomorph dinosaur from southern Africa

Massospondylus (/ˌmæsoʊˈspɒndɪləs/ MASS-oh-SPON-di-lus) is a genus of sauropodomorph dinosaur from the Early Jurassic of southern Africa. It was described by Richard Owen in 1854 from remains discovered in South Africa, and is thus one of the first dinosaurs to have been named. The name Massospondylus means 'longer vertebra', alluding to what Owen identified as tail vertebrae; these vertebrae are now known to be from the neck. Although the original fossils were destroyed in London during The Blitz, a plethora of specimens have since been assigned to the genus, making it one of the best-known sauropodomorphs from the Early Jurassic. The genus lived during the Hettangian, Sinemurian, and Pliensbachian ages, which lasted from ca. 201 to 184 million years ago. Most fossils come from the upper Elliot and Clarens formations of South Africa and Lesotho, but the genus is also found in the Forest Sandstone and the Mpandi Formation of Zimbabwe. Material from the US, India, and Argentina was previously assigned to the genus, but the US and Argentinian specimens are now assigned to their own genera (Sarahsaurus and Adeopapposaurus). Because of their great abundance, Massospondylus fossils have been used to date rocks, and a biozone, the Massospondylus Range Zone, is named after the genus.

Two species are considered valid: the type species M. carinatus, as well as M. kaalae, which was named in 2009 and is known from a single skull. Six other species have been named during the past 150 years but are no longer recognised. Originally, Massospondylus and similar dinosaurs have been regarded as theropods, but are now classified as basal ("early diverging") members of Sauropodomorpha. This group also includes sauropods. Within sauropodomorphs, Massospondylus is often classified in the family Massospondylidae. The genus was 4–6 metres (13–20 ft) long, with a long neck and tail, a small head, and a slender body. It is distinguished from related genera by the very elongated vertebrae of the front portion of the neck, amongst other features. Although Massospondylus was long depicted as quadrupedal (four-legged), it is now considered to have been bipedal (two-legged).

This dinosaur was probably a herbivore (plant-eater), although some have speculated that basal sauropodomorphs may have been omnivorous. On each of its hands, it bore a sharp thumb claw that was probably used in feeding, possibly to uproot vegetation or to pull down branches while rearing up. Clutches of eggs have been found, some of which contained embryos; these are among the oldest eggs and embryos of an amniote in the fossil record. The eggshell was extremely thin, less than 0.1 mm (0.0039 in), unlike the much thicker eggshells in later dinosaurs. The embryos had proportionally longer arms than adults and a very large head, leading researchers to suggest that they were quadrupedal and shifted to a bipedal posture later during growth. Newer research instead suggested that Massospondylus was bipedal at all ages. Individuals accelerated or slowed down their growth depending on environmental factors such as food availability. The oldest known specimen was around 20 years of age.

== History of discovery ==
=== Owen's 1854 description and loss of the type material ===
The first fossils of Massospondylus were described by Richard Owen in 1854. The material, a collection of 56 bones or bone fragments, was found in 1853 or 1854 by the government surveyor Joseph Millard Orpen and his brothers on a farm in the Drakensberg mountains near Harrismith, South Africa. Their father then donated the fossils to the Hunterian Museum in London, of which Owen was curator. Owen named three new species from this material based on differences in their supposed tail vertebrae: Massospondylus carinatus, Pachyspondylus orpenii, and Leptospondylus capensis. The name Massospondylus (meaning 'longer vertebra') is derived from the Greek μάσσων (massōn) 'longer' and σπόνδυλος (spondylos) 'vertebra'; Owen stated that he chose this name "because the vertebrae are proportionally longer than those of the extinct crocodile called Macrospondylus". The specific name carinatus probably hints at the pronounced keel (carina) at the underside of the vertebrae. Leptospondylus means 'slender vertebra', (Note: From the Greek λεπτός (leptós) 'slender'; the specific name capensis probably refers to the Cape Colony) while Pachyspondylus means 'thick vertebra'. (Note: From the Greek πᾰχῠ́ς (păkhŭ́s) 'thick'; the specific name orpenii likely honors the Orpen family or one of its members) Among the bones in Orpen's collection were vertebrae from the neck, back, hip, and tail; bones of the pelvis; the humerus (upper arm bone); and parts of the hindlimb including the femur (thigh bone), tibia (shin bone), and some foot bones. Orpen believed that more fossils would be found if the site were excavated. All these bones were probably found disarticulated (not connected to each other), making it difficult to determine whether or not they belonged to the same species. Yet, Owen assigned most of the bones to either Massospondylus, Pachyspondylus, or Leptospondylus, which Hans-Dieter Sues found to be somewhat arbitrary in 2004. In the decades after Owen's publication, the three species were neglected by other scholars, which Paul Barrett and Kimberley Chapelle speculated was due to Owen's "rather perfunctory descriptions", which lacked illustrations.

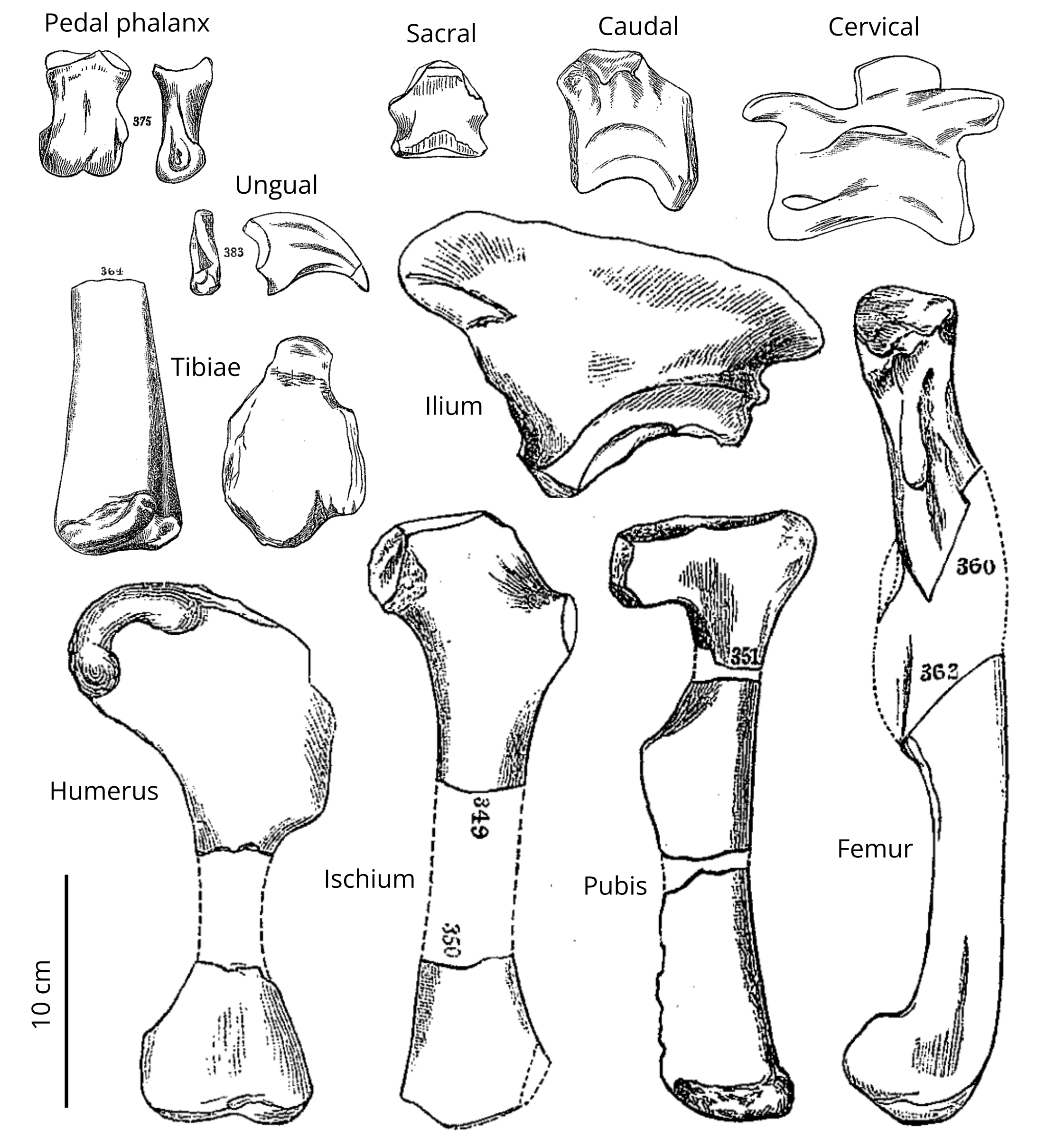
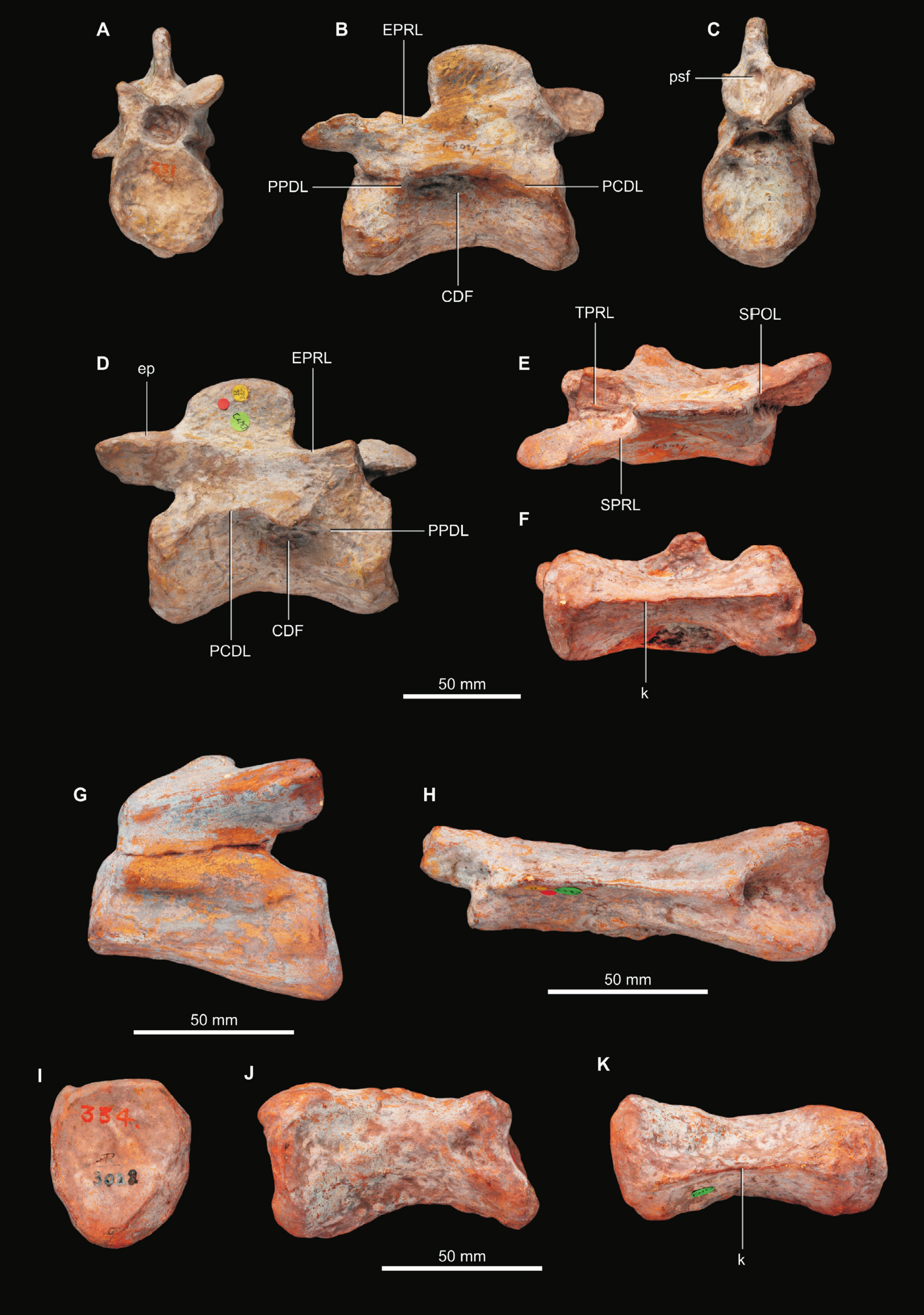
The lost Orpen collection. Left: Line drawings of representative specimens by Harry Seeley, 1895. Right: Casts of the original material on which Massospondylus carinatus was based (syntype series).

In 1888, Richard Lydekker studied the material and found Leptospondylus was likely a synonym of Massospondylus, though he did not mention Pachyspondylus. Lydekker furthermore proposed that Owen's description was too incomplete for the name Massospondylus carinatus to be considered valid, and that his own publication should instead be recognised as the source of the name. Consequently, he selected a neck vertebra and a toe bone as type specimens (representative specimens on which a taxon is based). This proposal was mostly ignored by later authors, and Owen's description is valid according to the International Code of Zoological Nomenclature (ICZN). In 1895, Harry Seeley revised Massospondylus and illustrated many of the fossils for the first time. Seeley argued that the putative tail vertebrae of Massospondylus were actually neck vertebrae, and that the tail vertebrae of Pachyspondylus orpenii were probably those of Massospondylus. Therefore, he concluded that most of the fossils probably belonged to a single species and assigned them to Massospondylus, but noted that they represent at least three individuals. Another redescription of the Orpen specimens was published by Friedrich von Huene in 1906, who assigned all material to Massospondylus. At the beginning of World War II, the basements of the Hunterian Museum were strengthened to protect specimens from German bombing raids, and several collections were moved to remote locations. The museum was damaged during several nearby bombings before it was directly hit by a bomb on the night between May 10 and 11, 1941, causing debris to fall into the dungeons and the building to be flooded due to heavy rain. Only 23 of 550 specimens in the museum's comparative anatomy collection survived. Many specimens that have been pivotal in the history of science were lost, as well as the entire Orpen collection, including Massospondylus, Pachyspondylus, and Leptospondylus, of which only illustrations and plaster casts remain.

=== Neotype specimen and M. kaalae ===
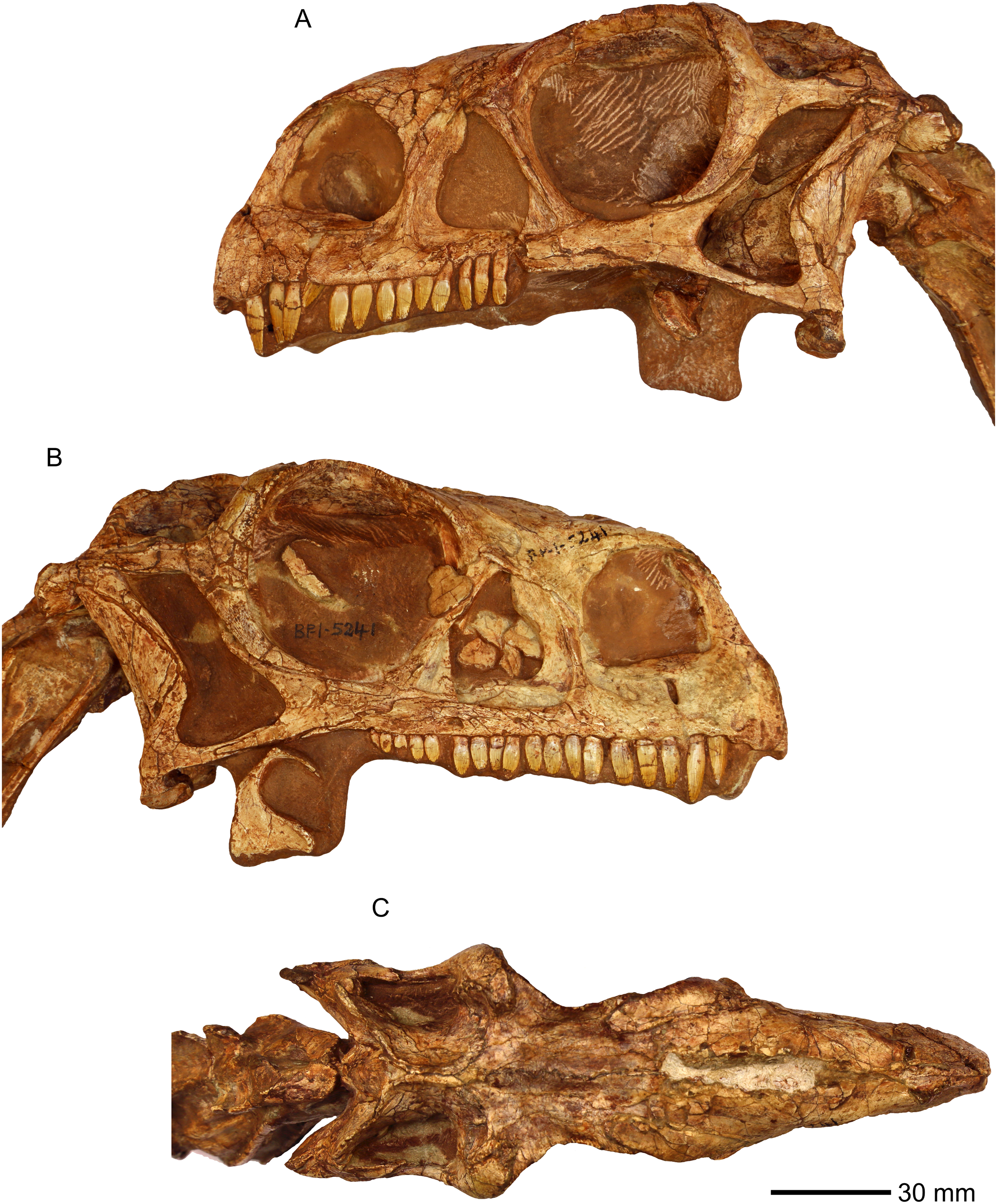
The neotype skull in left, right, and top views

By 1976, Massospondylus was the most widespread sauropodomorph known from southern Africa thanks to continued discoveries in South Africa, Lesotho, and Zimbabwe. In that year, James Kitching discovered clutches with eggs in a roadcut in Golden Gate Highlands National Park, a locality known as Rooidraai ('Red Bend'). Already in 1961, a British-South African palaeontological expedition discovered the skeleton of a hatchling (SAM-PK-K413) at Mafeteng, Lesotho, although this specimen was first misidentified as the varanopid Heleosaurus. In 1981, Michael Cooper published a comprehensive monograph on the Zimbabwean Massospondylus material, describing the entire skeleton apart from the skull, of which no material was available. He also discussed the palaeobiology of the genus in detail for the first time. Cooper concluded that none of the other gracile (slender-built) sauropodomorph species from South Africa differed substantially from M. carinatus, and consequently synonymised them all with the latter. A large number of specimens were assigned to M. carinatus as a result. Over the next two decades, new specimens of gracile sauropodomorphs from southern Africa were often assigned to M. carinatus by default and without much scrutiny because it was the only recognised species. The skull of Massospondylus was first described in detail in 1990 by Chris Gow and colleagues based on four well-preserved skulls housed at the Evolutionary Studies Institute (Note: Part of the University of the Witwatersrand, and formerly known as the Bernhard Price Institute for Palaeontological Research) in Johannesburg. In 2004, Hans-Dieter Sues and colleagues provided a more comprehensive description of the same four skulls, and proposed the first diagnosis of M. carinatus (the set of distinguishing features).

Timelapse video showing the creation of a support jacket for one of the blocks of the neotype specimen

The five neck vertebrae on which M. carinatus was originally based (the syntype series) do not show distinguishing features and cannot serve as a basis for comparison. Consequently, Yates and Barrett proposed in 2010 to designate a different specimen, BP/1/4934, as the neotype specimen (the new representative specimen). This specimen consists of an almost complete skeleton with skull housed at the Evolutionary Studies Institute. The skull was described in detail in 2018 by Chapelle and Jonah Choiniere, while Barrett and colleagues described the remainder of the skeleton in 2019. The specimen, nicknamed "Big Momma" although its sex is unknown, was found in March 1980 on a farm near Clocolan, South Africa, by Lucas Huma and James Kitching. Other fossils were found on the same farm, including the holotype of the turtle Australochelys africanus and the cynodont Pachygenelus. "Big Momma" includes a nearly complete skull and large parts of an articulated skeleton. As of 2019, it is the largest and most complete Massospondylus specimen and probably the most complete basal (early diverging) sauropodomorph specimen discovered in Africa. Since 1990, it has been on public exhibit in the Evolutionary Studies Institute. To maintain the original positions of the bones as they had been found, the specimen was prepared from above and below, but with most bones still partly encased in the original rock matrix. However, the specimen has been divided into seven individual blocks, the heaviest of which is about 35 kg (77 lb) in weight. In the 2000s, the specimen was extensively restored after it became apparent that the fossils were deteriorating due to repeated handling. These conservation efforts included the filling of gaps and cracks in the bones, the application of a resin for hardening, and new support jackets to support the blocks.

Skull diagrams of M. carinatus (left) and M. kaalae (right), with known bones shown in white, to scale

Besides the type species Massospondylus carinatus, one additional species, Massospondylus kaalae, is currently recognised. M. kaalae is known from a single partial skull (SAM-PK-K1325) from the Upper Elliot Formation near Herschel, South Africa. This skull was collected in 1966 by Gow and others, but since then has remained undescribed in the Iziko South African Museum in Cape Town. In 2004, Barrett noted that this skull belonged to a new species, which he named M. kaalae in 2009. The species is named in honor of the museum's collections manager for the Karoo vertebrate fossils, Sheena Kaal, for her assistance to numerous scientists who have studied specimens at the museum.

=== Previously assigned material ===
==== Previously recognised species from southern Africa ====
Interactive 3D scan of the neotype skull

In 1895, Seeley named the species M. browni, although its assignment to Massospondylus was only tentative. This species was based on two neck, two back, and three tail vertebrae as well as femora and toe bones that were discovered north of the Witteberg by Alfred Brown. In 1906, von Huene concluded that the vertebrae and femora of M. browni belonged to two separate species. He therefore restricted M. browni to just the femora, and moved the species into the genus Thecodontosaurus, as T. browni. He assigned the vertebrae as well as additional fossils stored in Vienna to another species, Hortalotarsus skirtopodus, which he also moved into Thecodontosaurus, as T. skirtopodus. In 1920, Egbert Cornelis Nicolaas van Hoepen assigned a partial skeleton to M. browni, which was later assigned to M. harriesi and is now listed as a specimen of M. carinatus. M. browni was considered an indeterminate sauropodomorph in a 2004 review by Peter Galton and Paul Upchurch.

Two more species were described in the first half of the 20th century: M. harriesi and M. schwarzi. M. harriesi was named by Robert Broom in 1911 based on parts of a forelimb and hind limb discovered near Fouriesburg. Broom suggested that the original material described by Owen included a second species besides M. carinatus which can possibly be assigned to his M. harriesi. Several additional specimens were assigned to M. harriesi in 1911 and 1924, and in 1976, Galton and Michael Albert Cluver synonymised several other sauropodomorph species with it. M. schwarzi was named by Sydney H. Haughton in 1924 based on an incomplete foot found near Tlokoeng by Professor Schwarz. Both species were considered as indeterminate sauropodomorphs in the 2004 review.

==== Previous synonyms ====
Several other species from South Africa have originally been assigned to different genera, were later regarded as synonyms of Massospondylus, and are currently regarded as indeterminate (too incomplete to be classified). These include the above-mentioned Leptospondylus capensis and Pachyspondylus orpenii, as well as Hortalotarsus skirtopodus, Aetonyx palustris, Gryponyx africanus, Gyposaurus capensis, Gryponyx transvaalensis, Thecodontosaurus minor, Aristosaurus erectus, Dromicosaurus gracilis, Thecodontosaurus dubius, and Gryponyx taylori.

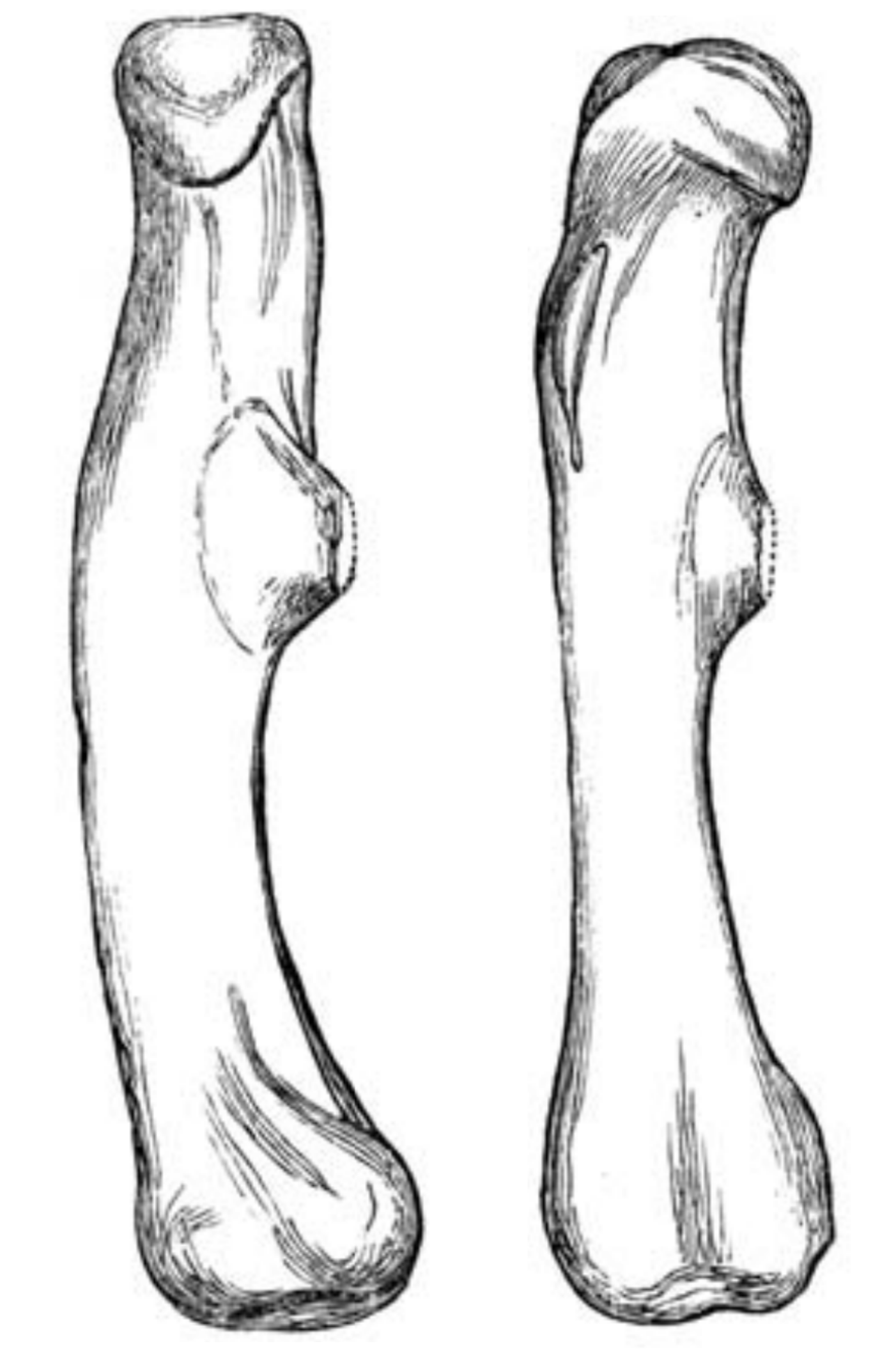
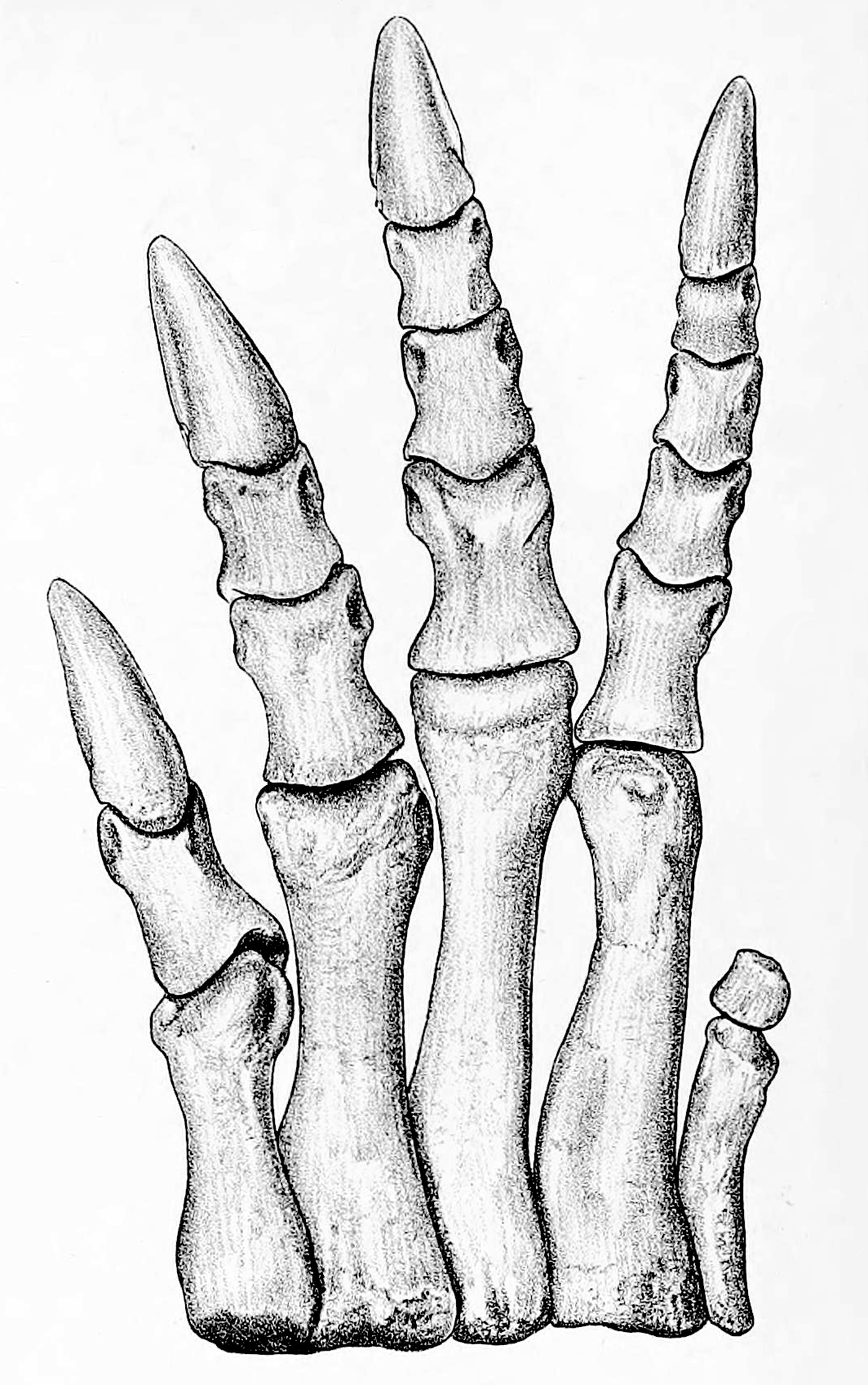
Previously recognised species. Left: Right femora of M. browni. Right: Right foot of M. harriesi.

Hortalotarsus skirtopodus was named by Seeley in 1894, based on a specimen found in the Clarens Formation near Barkly East. Most of the original skeleton was destroyed in an attempt to remove it from the rock matrix, and only a fragmentary hind limb remains. Aetonyx palustris, Gryponyx africanus and Gyposaurus capensis were all named by Broom in 1911. Aetonyx palustris and Gryponyx africanus are each based on a fragmentary skeleton without skull found in the upper Elliot Formation near Fouriesburg, while Gyposaurus capensis is based on a fragmentary skeleton without skull discovered in the Clarens Formation near Ladybrand. One year later, in 1912, Broom named Gryponyx transvaalensis from two foot bones (an ungual and a metatarsal) discovered in the Bushveld Sandstone Formation in Limpopo Province. Thecodontosaurus minor was named by Haughton in 1918 based on a neck vertebra, a tibia, and an ilium found in the Elliot Formation near Maclear. Aristosaurus erectus was named by van Hoepen in 1920 based on a nearly complete skeleton of a small and potentially juvenile individual found by quarry workers in the Clarens Formation near Rosendal. In another paper from the same year, van Hoepen also named Dromicosaurus gracilis from a fragmentary skeleton he had discovered near Bethlehem, South Africa. In 1924, Haughton erected another species of Thecodontosaurus, T. dubius, as well as Gryponyx taylori. Thecodontosaurus dubius is based on a specimen comprising much of the skeleton from the Clarens Formation near Ladybrand, South Africa. Gryponyx taylori is based on a fragmentary pelvis from the Upper Elliot Formation near Fouriesburg.

In 1976, Galton and Cluver assigned Aetonyx palustris, Gryponyx africanus, Gryponyx taylori, Dromicosaurus gracilis, and Thecodontosaurus dubius to M. harriesi. Cooper, in 1981, instead considered all taxa as synonyms of M. carinatus. Galton, in a 1990 review, only listed Aetonyx palustris, Gryponyx africanus, Gyposaurus capensis, and Gryponyx taylori as synonyms of M. carinatus, while the 2004 review considers all species to be indeterminate sauropodomorphs rather than synonyms of Massospondylus.

==== Other previously assigned specimens ====
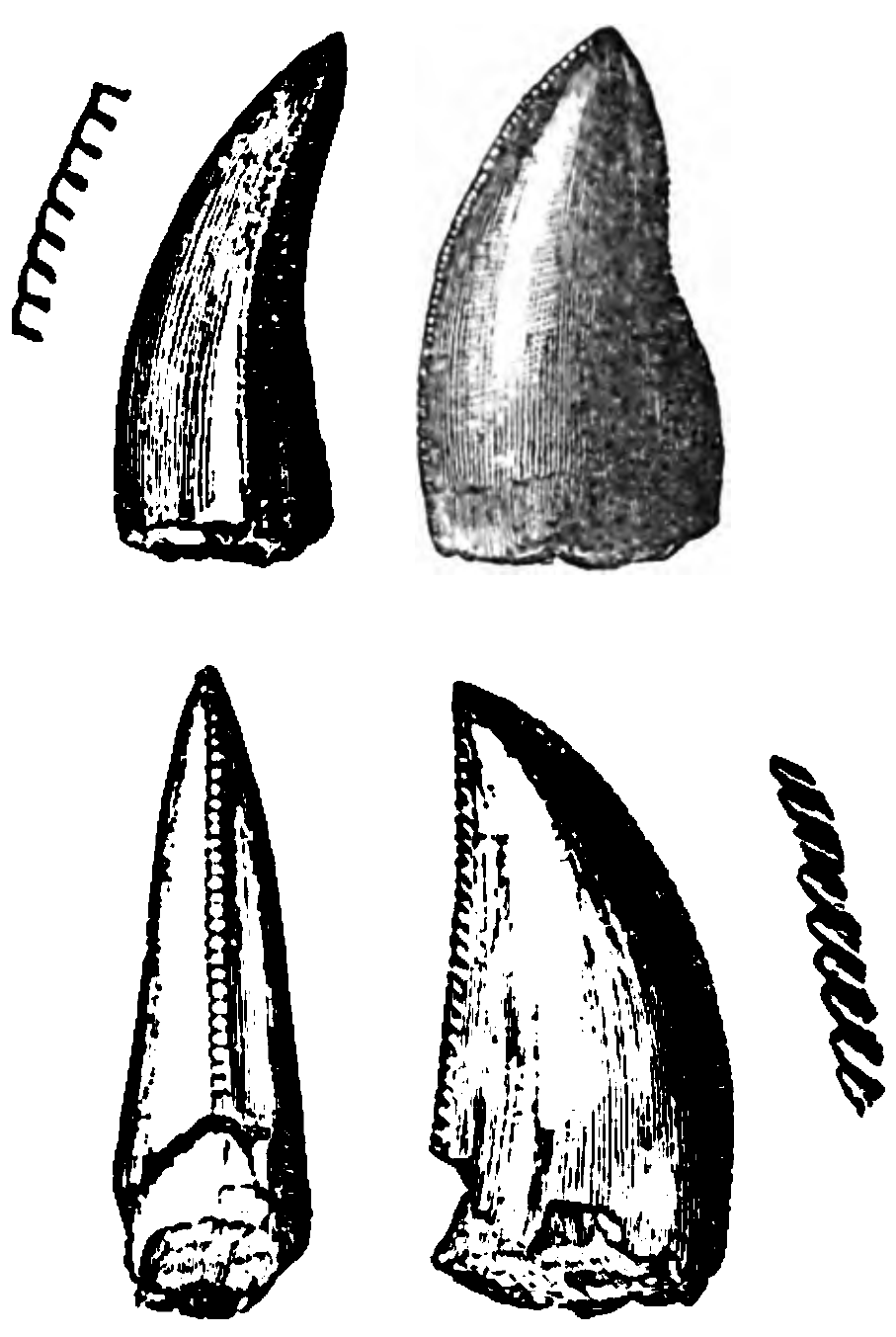
Teeth from India. Top: Tooth assigned to M. hislopi; bottom: type specimen of M. rawesi

During the 21st century, two additional massospondylid genera were identified in southern Africa, raising the question of whether all of the previous identifications of Massospondylus specimens were correct. The first of these genera, Ignavusaurus, was described in 2010 from a juvenile specimen. In 2011, Yates and colleagues considered it to be a probable synonym of Massospondylus, but cladistic analyses led by Chapelle in 2018 and 2019 recovered it as a distinct taxon of massospondylid. The second genus, Ngwevu, was described in 2019 by Chapelle and colleagues based on a complete skull with a fragmentary skeleton that had been discovered in 1978 and was previously assigned to M. carinatus. In 2023, Chapelle and colleagues concluded that a humerus from the upper Elliot Formation, which also had been provisionally assigned to Massospondylus, belonged to a new sauropodomorph genus that was unusually small. This potential genus remains unnamed.

Massospondylus has been previously recognised from outside of Africa, namely from the Lower Maleri and Takli formations of India, the Kayenta Formation of the US, and the Cañón del Colorado Formation of Argentina. In 1890, Lydekker described the species M. hislopi and M. rawesi from fossils found in India. M. hislopi was based on a single fragmentary vertebra from the Lower Maleri Formation in Andhra Pradesh, while M. rawesi was based on a single tooth found by Mr. Rawes in the Upper Cretaceous Takli Formation in Maharashtra. In 1906, von Huene believed that both species were not dinosaurs. M. hislopi was listed as an indeterminate sauropodomorph in a 2004 review by Galton and Upchurch but M. rawesi is an indeterminate theropod. Other Massospondylus fossils from India were mentioned in 1987 by T.S. Kutty and colleagues but have instead been assigned to the family Guaibasauridae in 2011. The material from the US, which consists of a nearly complete skull with skeleton described in 1985, was assigned to the new and closely related genus Sarahsaurus in 2010–2011. In 2009, the Argentinian material, which consists of several partial skeletons described in 1999, has likewise been recognised as a new genus, Adeopapposaurus.

Cooper, in his 1981 study, suggested that the Chinese genera Yunnanosaurus and Lufengosaurus were synonyms of Massospondylus, which would have expanded its range to China. He classified Lufengosaurus as a separate species of Massospondylus, M. huenei. This suggestion was not followed by subsequent authors.

== Description ==
Size compared to a human

Massospondylus was a mid-sized sauropodomorph. In 2019, Barrett and colleagues estimated the particularly large neotype specimen at around 5 m (16 ft) in length. Gregory S. Paul, in a popular book published in 2024, estimated Massospondylus to be 4.3 m (14 ft) in length. The body weight was estimated at 136.7 kg (301 lb) by Frank Seebacher in 2001, assuming a body length of 4 m (13 ft). Paul instead gave a body weight of 195 kg (430 lb). It was a typical basal sauropodomorph, with a slender body, a long neck, and a proportionally very small head. It had a slighter build than Plateosaurus, an otherwise similar but larger dinosaur. Basal sauropodomorphs probably had air sacs and possibly a bird-like flow-through lung. In theropods and sauropods, these air sacs invaded bones, in particular the vertebrae (postcranial skeletal pneumaticity). Although some basal sauropodomorphs such as Plateosaurus show incipient pneumaticity in their vertebrae, those of Massospondylus are apneumatic (lack any signs of pneumaticity).

=== Skull ===
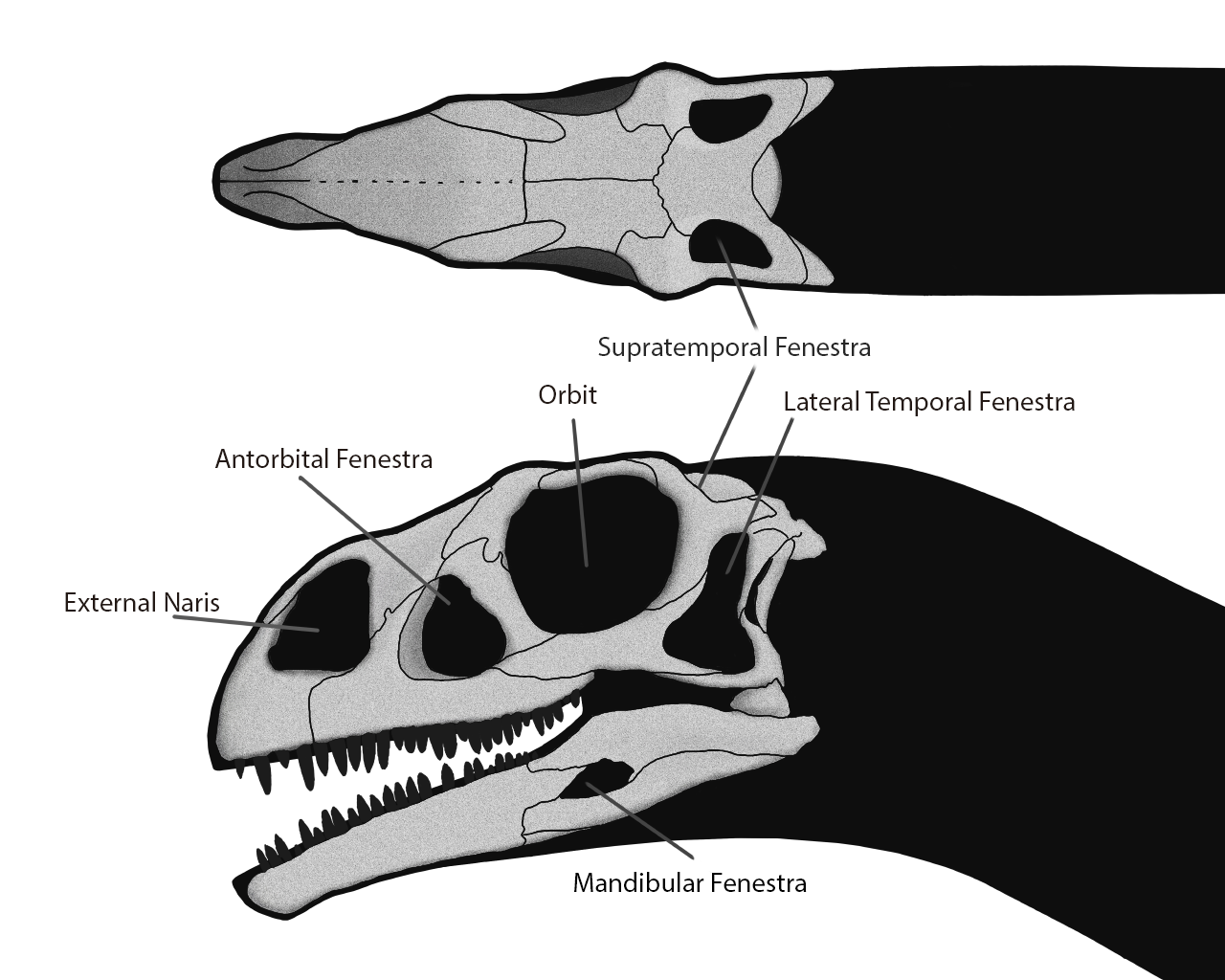
Diagram of the skull of Massospondylus, showing the various skull openings

The skull of Massospondylus was small and approximately half the length of the femur (thigh bone). Several openings in the skull, called fenestrae, reduced its weight and provided space for muscle attachment and sensory organs. At the front of the skull was the large external naris (nostril), which was roughly half the size of the orbit (eye socket). The posterior (rear) margin of the external naris was semicircular, while the anterior (front) part of the opening was triangular. The orbit was circular and proportionally larger than that of Plateosaurus. The antorbital fenestra, situated between the orbit and the external naris, was triangular and smaller than that of Plateosaurus. At the rear of the skull were the two temporal fenestrae: the lateral temporal fenestrae immediately behind the orbit that was shaped like an inverted "T", and the supratemporal fenestra on the top of the skull. In side view, the temporal region (the region behind the orbits) was shorter than in Plateosaurus. A small fenestra, the mandibular fenestra, also perforated the mandible. Traditionally, the skull was thought to be wider and shorter than that of Plateosaurus, but these proportions may be the result of deformation during fossilisation. Some features of the skull are variable between individuals; for example, the thickness of the upper border of the orbits and the height of the posterior portion of the maxilla, the main tooth-bearing bone of the upper jaw. These differences may be due to sexual dimorphism or individual variation. A single distinguishing feature is found in the skull: the basipterygoid processes, a pair of bony extensions that braces the braincase against the palate, form an angle of ca. 35°, whereas this angle is much larger in all other basal sauropodomorphs in which it can be measured. The species M. kaalae differs from M. carinatus in the morphology of the braincase; the proportionally longer premaxillary tooth row that accounted for more than 30% of the upper tooth row; and a better developed ridge on the upper edge of the lacrimal bone.

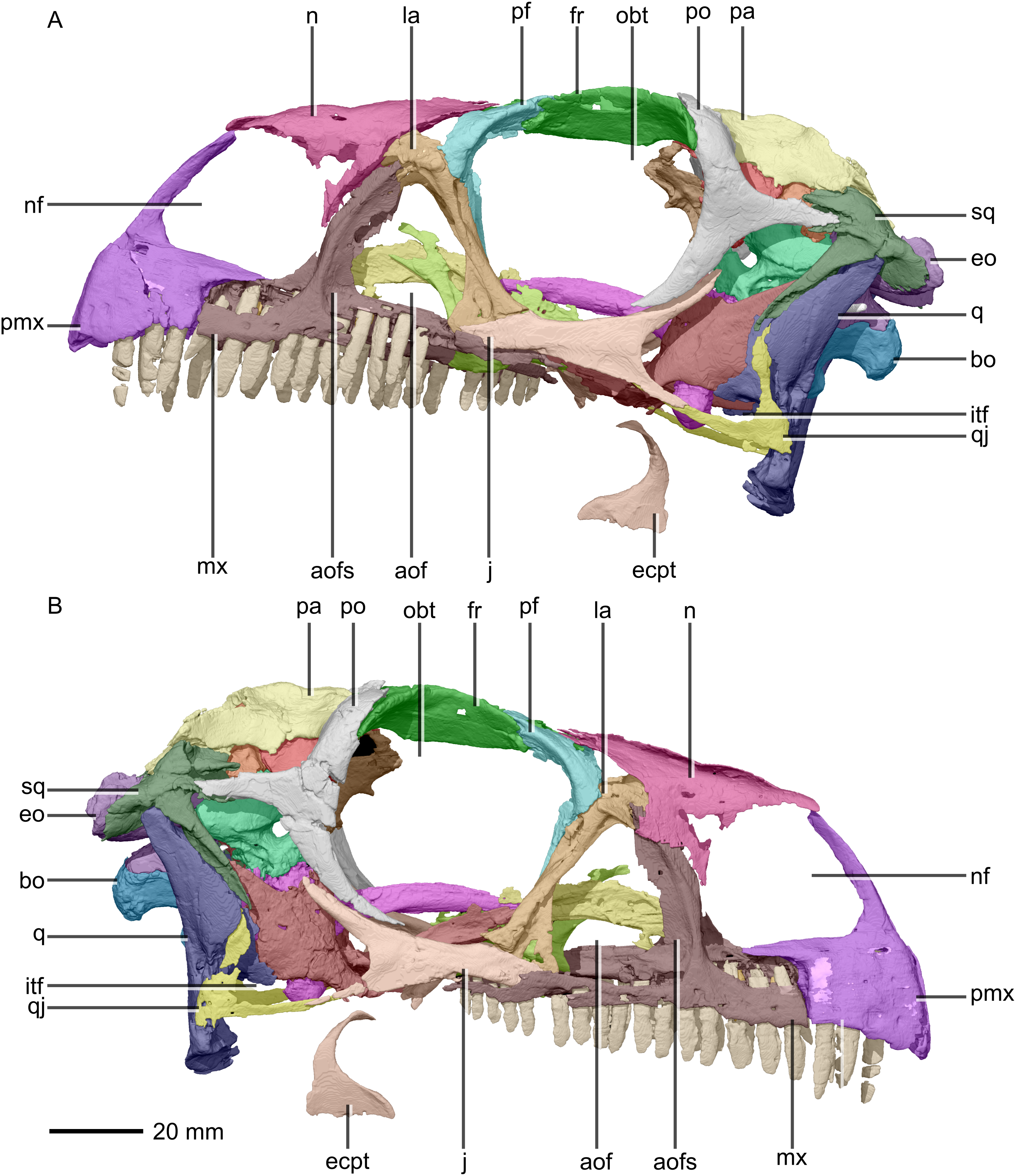
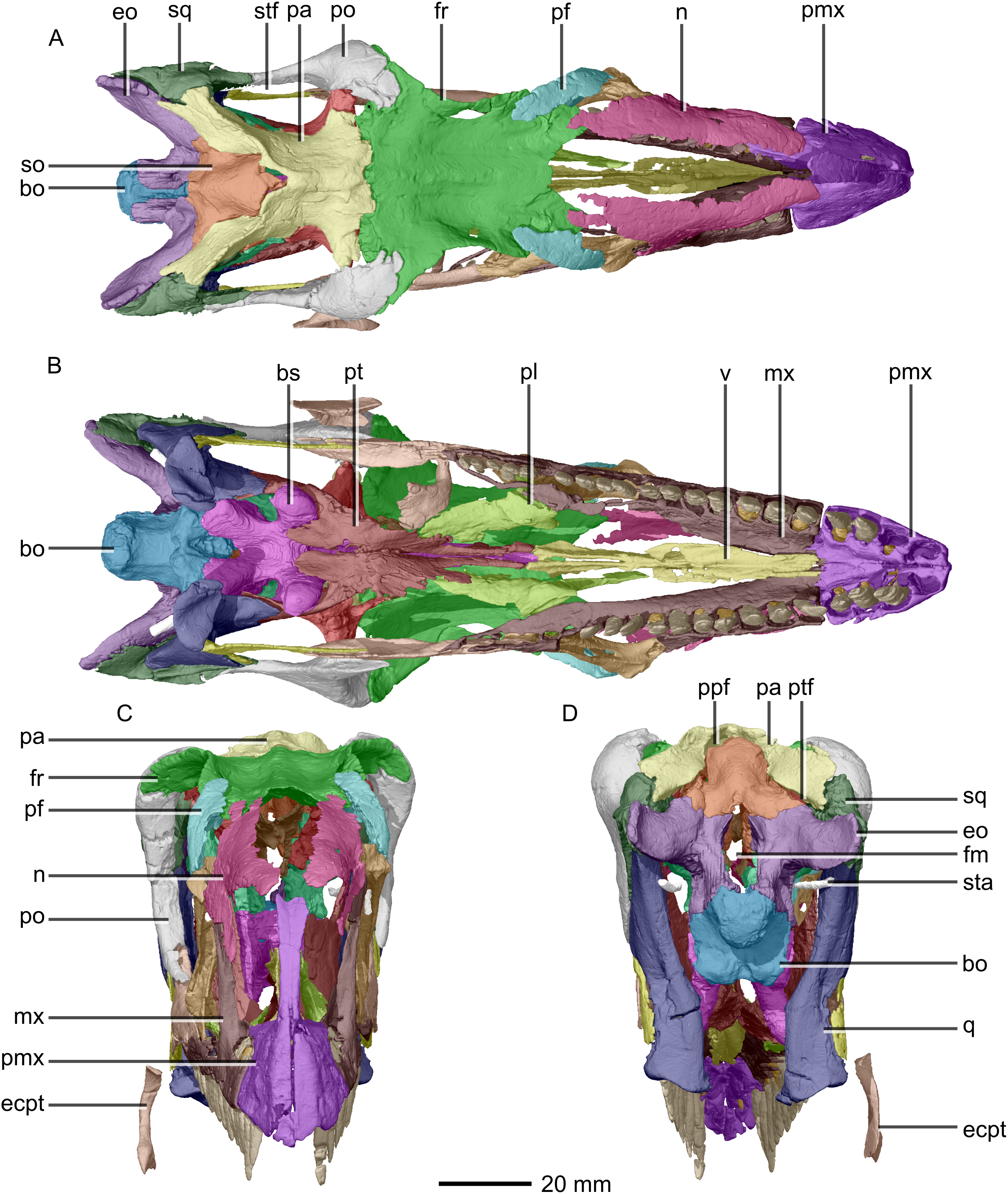
3D reconstruction of the neotype skull in left and right side views (left) and top, bottom, front, and rear views (right)

Tooth count was variable between individuals and increased with skull size. The premaxilla, the front bone of the upper jaw, showed the constant number of four teeth per side in all known skulls. In the maxilla, the tooth count varied from 14 to 22. There were 26 teeth on each side of the lower jaw in the largest known skull. The upper halves of the tooth crowns had serrated edges, with three to eight serrations on each side. Their height decreased from front to back in the upper jaw, but remained almost constant in the lower jaw. The rear edges of the teeth partially overlapped the front edges of the teeth behind them, forming a continuous cutting edge. The teeth were replaced throughout life, as in other dinosaurs. This resulted in neighbouring teeth being of different heights, giving the tooth row a profile similar to a saw. The lack of pronounced tooth wear suggests that tooth replacement was rapid; a 2013 study estimated that a tooth remained in use for only 17 to 30 days. The teeth varied in shape in different regions of the jaw; this heterodonty was more pronounced than that present in Plateosaurus. Teeth closer to the front of the snout had pointed tips and were slightly curved, unlike the posterior teeth that were spatulate (with a broad, flat tip) and more symmetrical. The teeth were proportionally longer and slenderer than those of Plateosaurus.

=== Postcranial skeleton ===
The vertebral column was composed of nine cervical (neck) vertebrae, 13 dorsal (back) vertebrae, three sacral (hip) vertebrae, and at least 40 tail vertebrae. The neck was proportionally long, and the centra (vertebral bodies) of the anterior cervicals were more than seven times as long as they were tall, more elongated than in any other basal sauropodomorph and therefore a distinguishing feature. In the anterior cervicals, the neural spine (the bony keel that formed the top of each vertebra) was elongated, and its anterior end had a hook-like protuberance that constitutes another distinguishing feature.

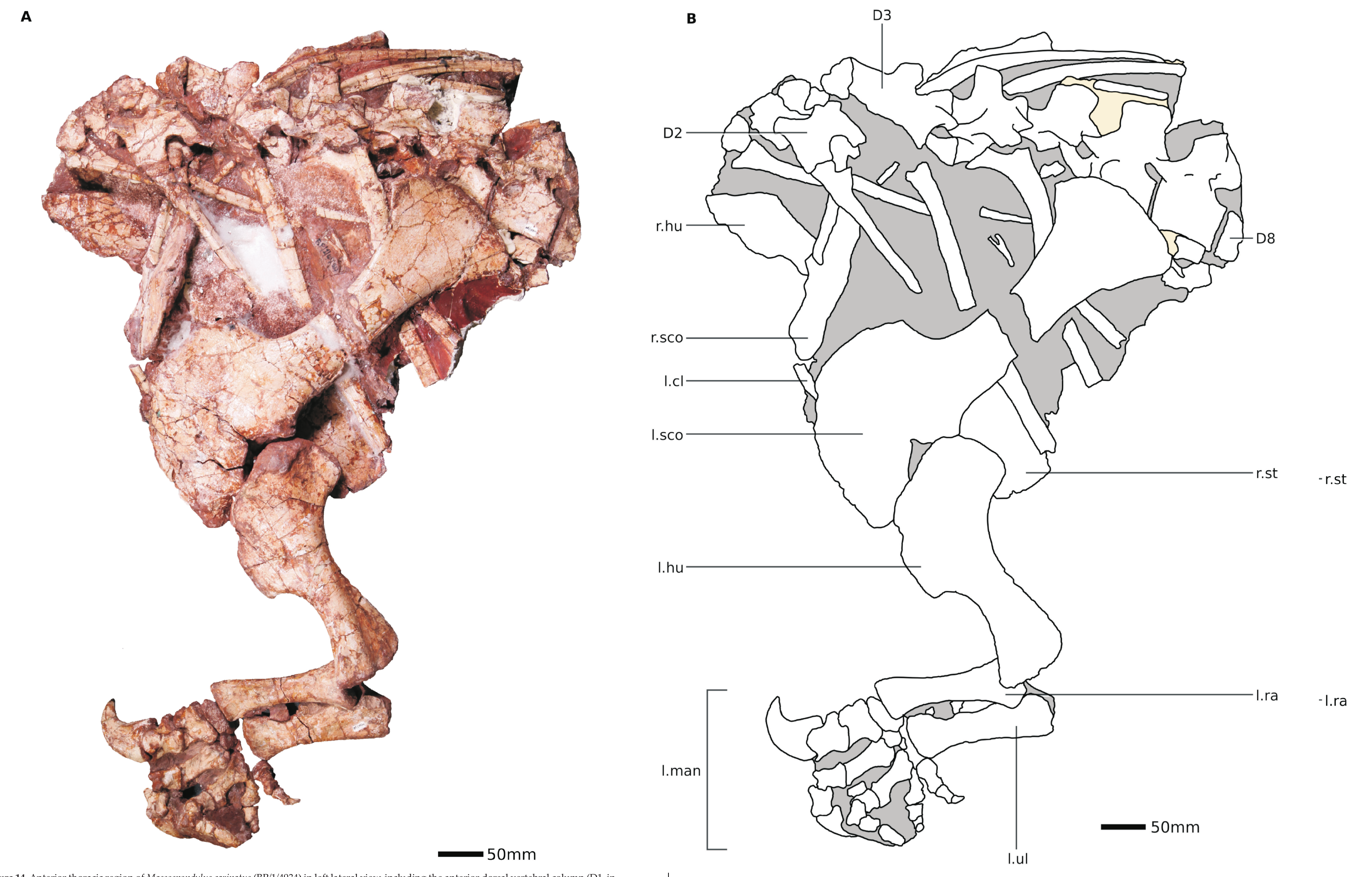
Shoulder girdle and arm of the neotype specimen

The shoulder blade had an expanded upper end. This expansion was more symmetrical than in related genera, in which the dorsal (front) expansion was much larger than the ventral (rear) expansion, and is a distinguishing feature. In the hip, the pubis faced forward, as with most saurischians. The front end of the pubis was expanded in side view, but this expansion affected only its posterior margin, while the bone was flat anteriorly, which is a distinguishing feature. The forelimbs were only half the length of the hind limbs but quite powerful, as indicated by a broad flange on the upper portion of the humerus called the deltopectoral crest, which provided attachment areas for a large arm musculature. This crest was longer than in related genera, extending for ca. 60% of the length of the bone, which is a distinguishing feature. The lower arm was proportionally short, with the ulna measuring around 60% of the length of the humerus, which is another distinguishing feature. Like Plateosaurus, it had five digits on each hand and foot. The hand was short and wide, with a large sickle-shaped thumb claw used for feeding or defence against predators. The thumb was the longest finger in the hand, while the fourth and fifth digits were tiny, giving the hands a lopsided look. The phalangeal formula of the hand, which states the number of finger bones from the thumb to the fifth digit, was 2-3-4-3-2. The foot also had a large claw on the first digit, which was curved and flattened laterally (side-to-side). The claws on the middle three digits instead were smaller, less curved, and flattened dorsoventrally (top to bottom). The fifth toe only had a single toe bone and no claw. The phalangeal formula of the foot was 2-3-4-5-1.

== Classification ==
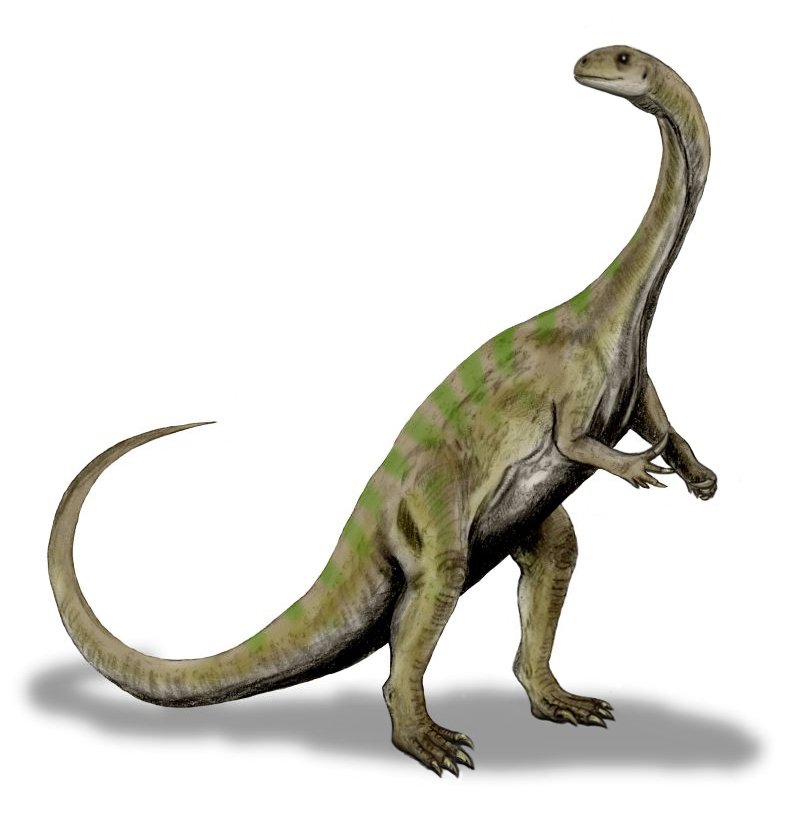
Life restoration of a bipedal adult Massospondylus carinatus

Described in 1854, Massospondylus was one of the first named dinosaurs from the Southern Hemisphere. Although Owen himself had named the group Dinosauria twelve years earlier in 1842, he did not recognise Massospondylus as a dinosaur. Instead, he attributed it to "large extinct carnivorous Reptiles" of uncertain classification, noting similarities with crocodilians, lizards, and dinosaurs. In an 1860 book, Owen classified Massospondylus as a crocodilian but did not explain this decision. In 1888, Lydekker demonstrated that Massospondylus is a genus of dinosaur, and classified it in the family Anchisauridae, within Theropoda. Seeley, in his 1895 revision, also found Massospondylus to be a theropod (a "megalosaurian saurischian"). Huene, in his 1906 redescription of the Orpen fossils, classified Massospondylus as a member of Thecodontosauridae, together with Thecodontosaurus and Anchisaurus. In 1914, von Huene instead named a new family, Massospondylidae, to accommodate M. carinatus, M. harriesi, and Aetonyx palustris, but in 1932 returned to his former classification of Massospondylus within Thecodontosauridae.

In 1920, von Huene named the new group Prosauropoda to unite the early long-necked dinosaurs including Massospondylus. In 1932, he also named the new group Sauropodomorpha, which contained his Prosauropoda as well as Sauropoda, abandoning the traditional classification of Massospondylus and related genera within Theropoda. Yet, the relationships between Theropoda and Prosauropoda remained contested until 1965, when Alan J. Charig argued that Prosauropoda was more closely related to Sauropoda. Charig divided Prosauropoda into three families, following earlier studies: the small-sized Thecodontosauridae, which still included Massospondylus; the medium-sized Plateosauridae; and the large-sized Melanorosauridae. This division of Prosauropoda into three families was generally upheld during the following decades, although several studies classified Massospondylus within the Plateosauridae or within another family, the Anchisauridae. In the 1990 edition of the encyclopedia The Dinosauria, Galton recognised additional prosauropod families including a resurrected Massospondylidae that contained Massospondylus as its only member. Massospondylidae has since been recognised by a majority of studies. The name "Prosauropoda" meanwhile fell into disuse as some prosauropods were closer to sauropods than to other prosauropods. Massospondylidae is instead classified within the group Plateosauria, which also includes the Plateosauridae, the Riojasauridae, and, depending on the study, may or may not include sauropods. Adam Yates, in 2007, named the group Massopoda as a sub-group of Plateosauria that includes Massospondylidae and sauropods but not Plateosauridae.

Besides Massospondylus itself, Massospondylidae typically includes Adeopapposaurus, Coloradisaurus, Leyesaurus, and Lufengosaurus. Glacialisaurus has also been consistently recovered as a member of Massospondylidae, and Pradhania, Ignavusaurus, and Ngwevu might also be members. The following cladogram shows the position of Massospondylus according to Oliver Rauhut and colleagues, 2020:

Interactive 3D scan of the elongated neck vertebrae of the neotype specimen; the long vertebrae gave Massospondylus ('longer vertebra') its name

- Massopoda
  - - Eucnemesaurus
    - Riojasaurus
  - - Sarahsaurus
    - - Sauropodiformes
      - Massospondylidae
        - - Yunnanosaurus
          - - Jingshanosaurus
            - Seitaad
        - - - Coloradisaurus
            - - Glacialisaurus
              - Lufengosaurus
          - - Massospondylus
            - - Adeopapposaurus
              - Leyesaurus

== Palaeobiology ==
=== Diet and feeding ===
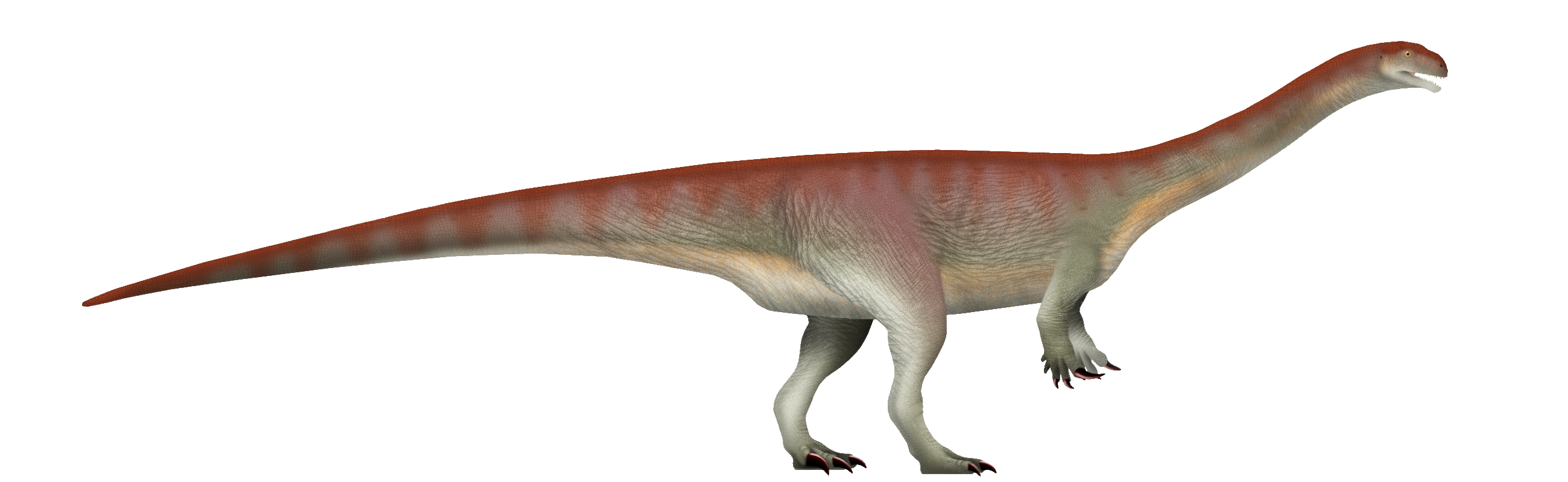
Life restoration of Massospondylus carinatus

Basal sauropodomorphs such as Massospondylus may have been herbivorous or omnivorous. As recently as the 1980s, palaeontologists debated the possibility of carnivory in basal sauropodomorphs. However, the hypothesis of carnivorous sauropodomorphs has been discredited, and all recent studies favour a herbivorous or omnivorous lifestyle for these animals. In 2004, Galton and Upchurch found that cranial characteristics (such as jaw articulation) of most basal sauropodomorphs are closer to those of herbivorous reptiles than those of carnivorous ones, and the shape of the tooth crown is similar to those of modern herbivorous or omnivorous iguanas. The maximum width of the crown was greater than that of the root, resulting in a cutting edge similar to those of extant herbivorous or omnivorous reptiles. In 2000, Barrett proposed that basal sauropodomorphs supplemented their herbivorous diets with small prey or carrion.

Like other basal sauropodomorphs, Massospondylus was an orthal feeder (its jaws made simple up-and-down movements). In their 1986 study, Alfred Crompton and John Attridge suggested that Massospondylus and Plateosaurus had weak bites because their skulls were lightly constructed and had long tooth rows. (Note: A longer tooth row would distribute the available bite force over a larger area, resulting in a weaker bite.) However, the jaw joint was lowered with respect to the tooth row, which increased muscle leverage and therefore led to a stronger bite. In 2019, Ali Nabavizadeh suggested that Massospondylus and Anchisaurus had a stronger bite than other basal sauropodomorphs because of the more anterior position of the jaw joint, resulting in a more vertical action of the palatal muscles (Musculus pterygoideus).

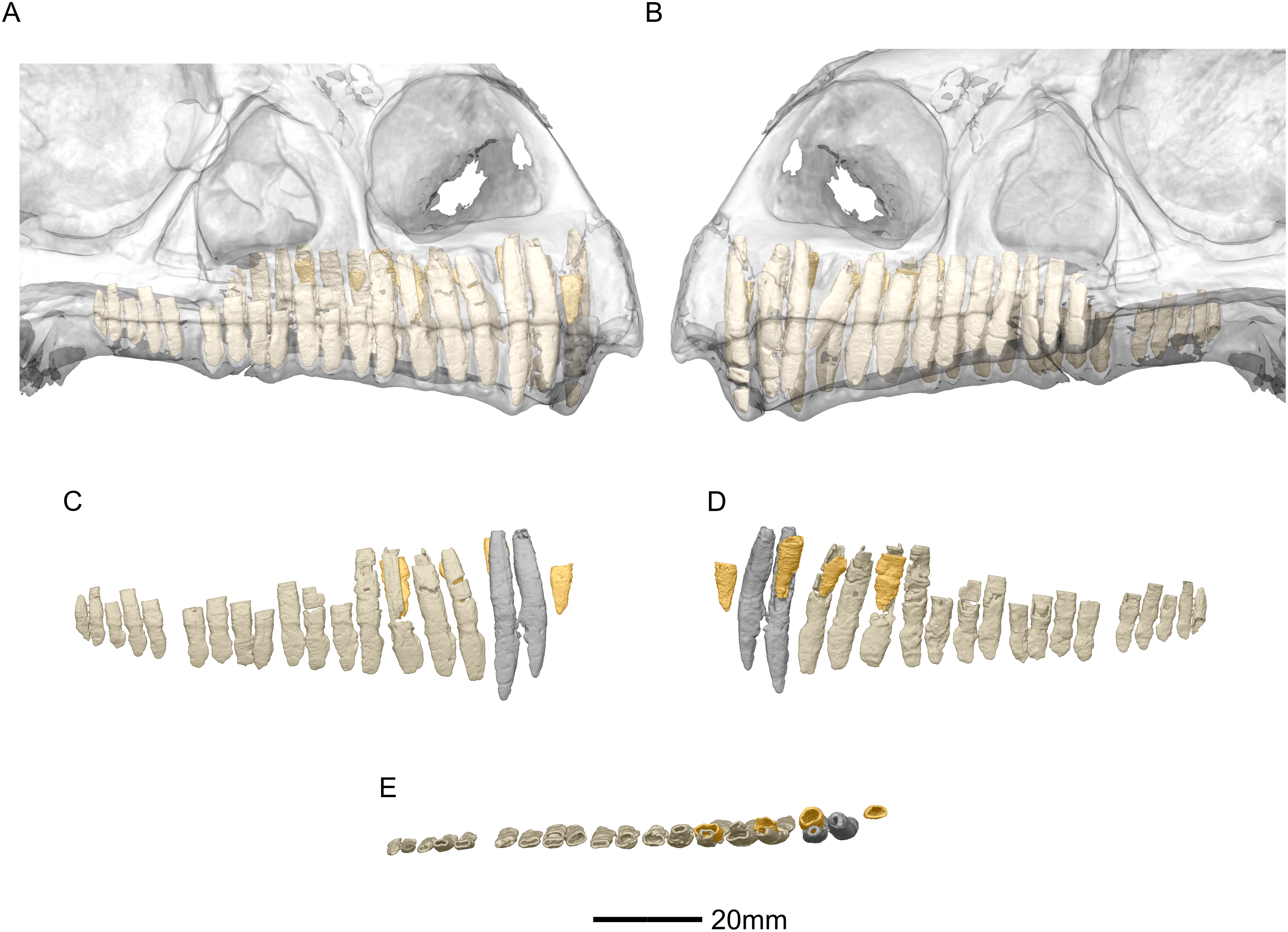
CT scan of the teeth within the upper jaw of the neotype skull; replacement teeth are shown in orange.

As with other basal sauropodomorphs, it has been proposed that Massospondylus had fleshy cheeks, as there were few but large holes for blood vessels on the surfaces of the jaw bones, unlike the numerous small holes present on the jaws of cheekless reptiles. The cheeks would have prevented food from spilling out when Massospondylus ate. However, in the early 2020s, Nabavizadeh argued that cheeks in dinosaurs are speculative and unlikely. In 1986, Crompton and Attridge described skulls of Massospondylus as possessing pronounced overbites and suggested the presence of a horny beak on the tip of the lower jaw to make up the difference in length. However, the difference in length may be a misinterpretation and caused by crushing of the skull in a top–bottom plane, and more recent studies consider the possession of a beak as unlikely. Gow, in 1990, suggested that the articulation between the premaxilla and the maxilla allowed for some degree of cranial kinesis (movement between skull bones), and that the same was true for the articulation between the quadrate and the quadratojugal, a condition known as streptostyly. However, a later study found these articulations to be relatively rigid. Gastroliths (gizzard stones) have been found in association with three Massospondylus fossils from the Forest Sandstone in Zimbabwe. In one of these specimens, the preserved gastroliths made up ca. 1% of the body mass. Until recently, scientists believed that these stones functioned as a gastric mill to aid ingestion of plant material, compensating for their inability to chew, as is the case in many modern birds. However, Oliver Wings and Martin Sander showed in 2007 that the polished nature and the abundance of those stones precluded their use as an effective gastric mill in most non-theropod dinosaurs, including Massospondylus.

=== Posture, range of motion, and function of thumb claw ===
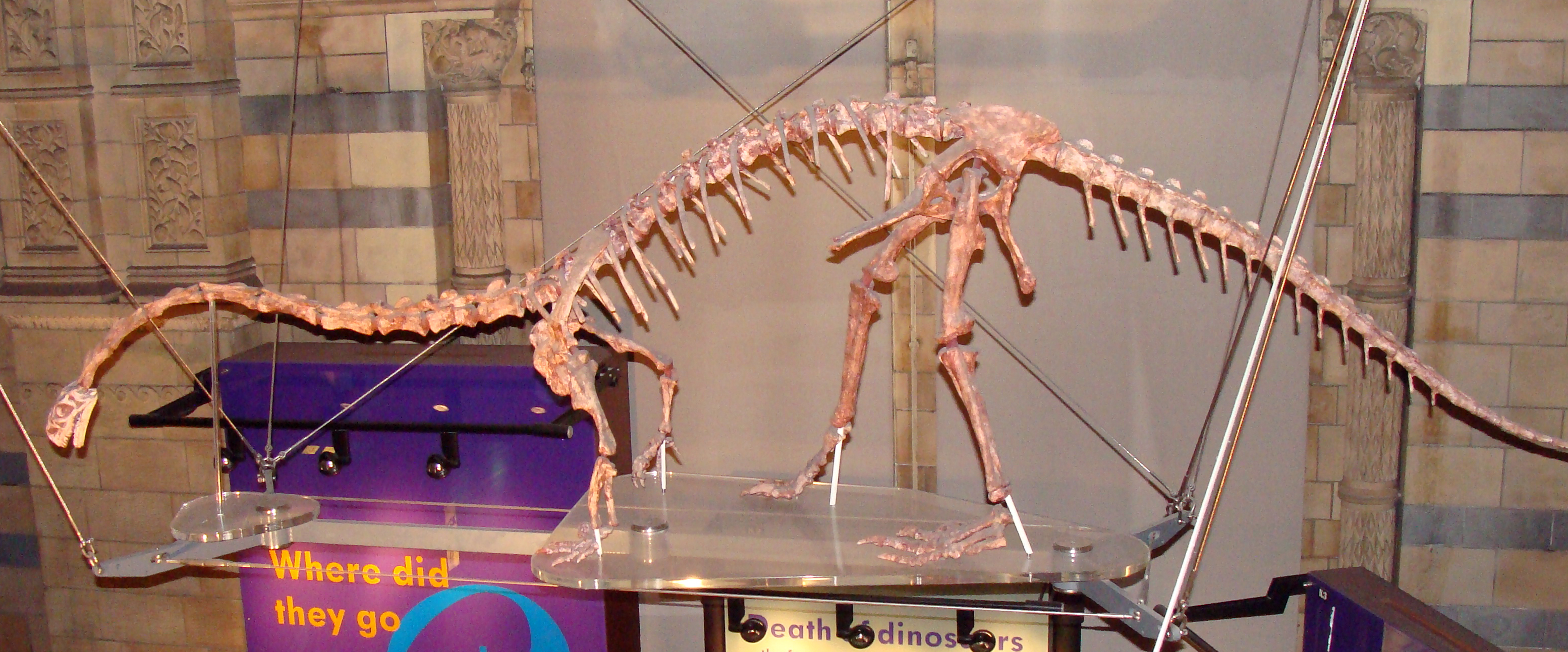
Mounted Massospondylus skeleton cast (NHMUK PV R8171) at the Natural History Museum, London, showing an outdated quadrupedal pose

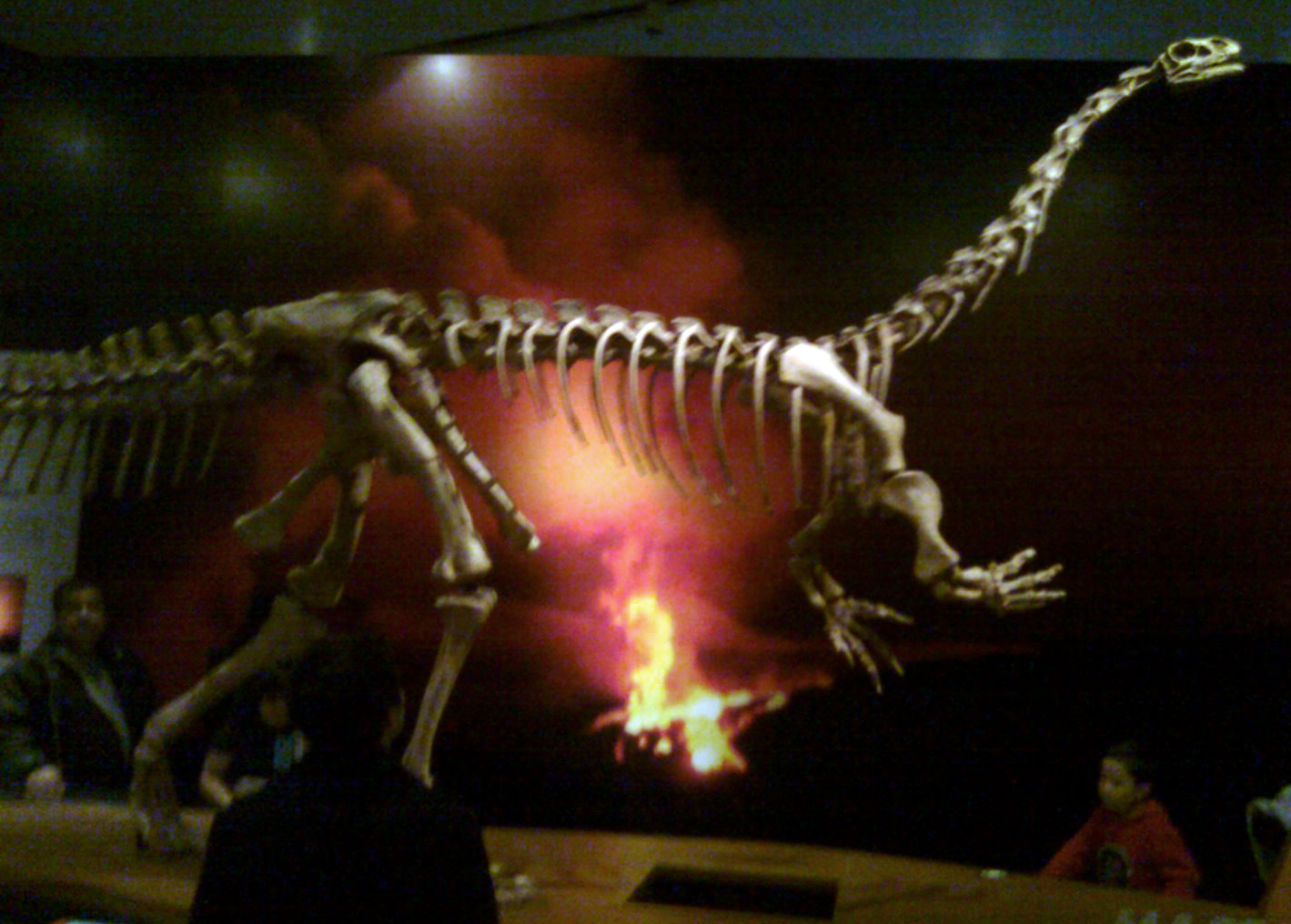
Mounted skeleton in modern, bipedal pose, Royal Ontario Museum

Although long assumed to have been quadrupedal (four-legged), Matthew Bonnan and Phil Senter questioned this in 2007, arguing that the animal was restricted to bipedal (two-legged) gaits. Neither could the forelimb swing forward and behind in a fashion similar to the hindlimbs, nor could the hand be pronated (rotated so that the fingers face forwards when the forelimb is vertical). This inability to pronate the hand is also supported by findings of articulated (still-connected) arms that always show palmar surfaces facing each other. The study also ruled out the possibility of knuckle-walking that would make effective locomotion possible without the need to pronate the hand. Bonnan and Senter suggested that some bipedal trackways of the ichnogenus Otozoum might have been produced by Massospondylus or similar bipedal sauropodomorphs.

It was often assumed that the large thumb claw of Massospondylus and other basal sauropodomorphs was used in defence against predators. In their 2007 study, Bonnan and Senter questioned this because the humerus could not swing forwards past the vertical. However, using the thumb claw for defence would have been possible if the animal reared up by using the tail as a third "leg". Although the hand could not reach the mouth, the thumb claw was probably used for feeding, such as for disrooting vegetation or, when rearing up, for pulling down branches. In 2025, Mooney and colleagues observed that the thumb claw is sickle-shaped in adult individuals but only slightly curved in the hatchling SAM-PK-K413 and relatively straight in one of the embryos. In the embryo, the thumb was already ossified while most other parts of the hands and feet were unossified, which might suggest that it had important functions already at early developmental stages.

Since the discovery of rudimentary and nonfunctional clavicles in ceratopsians, it was assumed that these shoulder bones were reduced in all dinosaurs that did not have true furculae. In 1987, Robert Bakker suggested that this would have allowed the shoulder blades to swing with the forelimbs in quadrupedal dinosaurs, increasing their functional forelimb length. This would have reduced the discrepancy of length between fore- and hindlimbs in a quadrupedal Massospondylus. However, the Massospondylus specimen BP-1-5241 preserves well-developed clavicles that are joined in a furcula-like arrangement, showing that they acted as a clasp between the right and left shoulder blades, prohibiting any rotation of these bones. According to a 2005 study by Yates and Cecilio Vasconcelos, the specimen indicates that clavicle reduction is limited to the evolutionary line leading to the ceratopsians. It also indicates that the furcula of birds is derived from clavicles.

In 1981, Michael Cooper argued that the zygapophyses (projections that form joints between vertebrae) of the neck were inclined, impeding horizontal neck movements and forcing the animal to move its entire body instead. This was contradicted by Barrett and Upchurch in 2007, who noted that only the hindmost cervicals showed inclined zygapophyses, allowing sufficient horizontal movement of the neck as a whole.

=== Growth ===
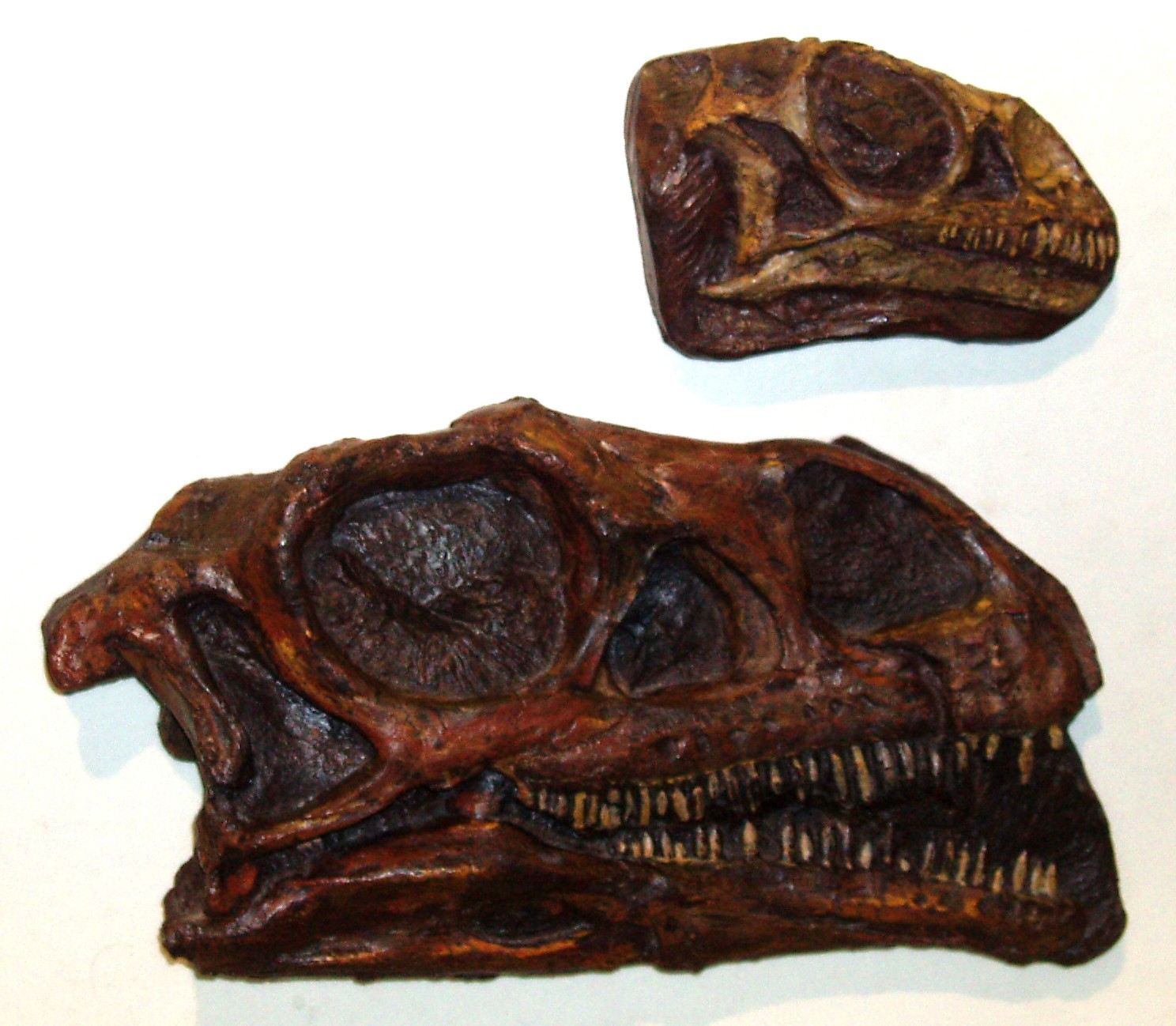
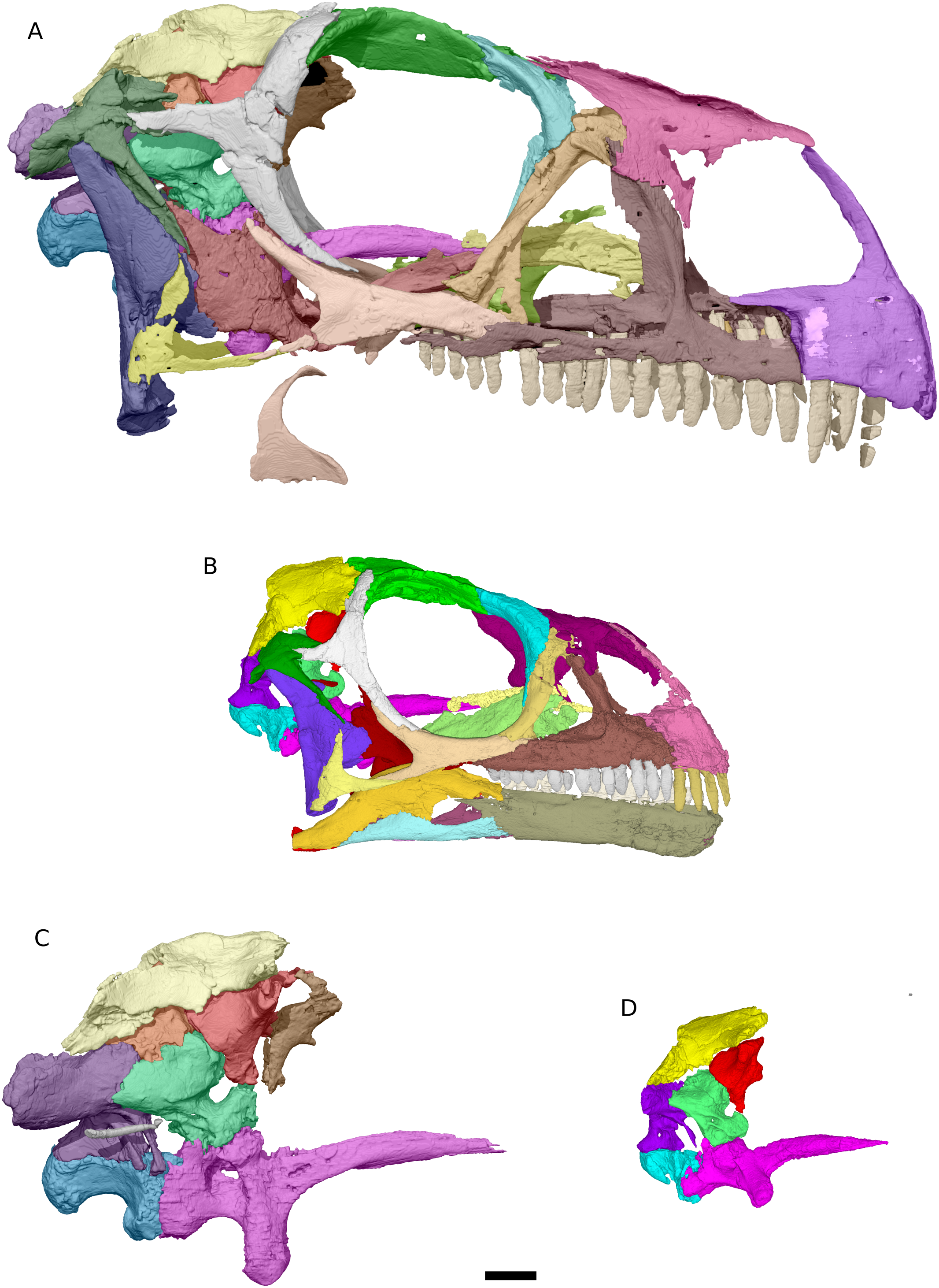
Top: Growth series from hatchling (left) to adult (right) skulls. Bottom left: Skulls casts of the juvenile specimen BP/1/4376 compared to an adult skull (the neotype specimen). Bottom right: 3D reconstructions of the same juvenile skull and the adult and juvenile braincase.

Growth in dinosaurs can be reconstructed using thin sections of bones that reveal growth rings, similar to the growth rings in trees. The first such study for Massospondylus was conducted in 1993 by Anusuya Chinsamy-Turan who, based on femora of different sizes, found that growth was cyclic, with one growth ring formed each year. Because an external fundamental system (tightly packed growth rings that indicate that growth had stopped) was absent, she suggested that Massospondylus had indeterminate growth (growth throughout life). This suggests that the physiology of Massospondylus was intermediate between ectothermy ("cold-bloodedness") and endothermy ("warm-bloodedness"). In a 2001 study, Gregory M. Erickson and colleagues indicated that Massospondylus grew at a maximum rate of 34.6 kg per year and were still growing at around 15 years of age.

A 2005 study by Martin Sander and Nicole Klein indicated that the related Plateosaurus adjusted its growth according to environmental conditions: when food was plentiful or when the climate was favourable, Plateosaurus exhibited accelerated growth. Consequently, body size is only weakly correlated with age. This pattern of growth is called "developmental plasticity" and is common in ectothermic animals but uncommon in endothermic animals. According to Sander and Klein, developmental plasticity is absent in Massospondylus, which they found to grow along a specific growth trajectory with little variation in the growth rate and ultimate size of an individual. In 2022, Chapelle and colleagues analysed multiple different bones from 27 Massospondylus specimens and instead found substantial growth variation as in Plateosaurus, suggesting that developmental plasticity was widespread in basal sauropodomorphs. These authors also argue that Massospondylus had determinate growth, contradicting the 1993 study of Chinsamy that suggested that growth was indeterminate. Growth had stopped in the oldest analysed specimen, which was estimated at 20 years old.

=== Eggs and embryos ===
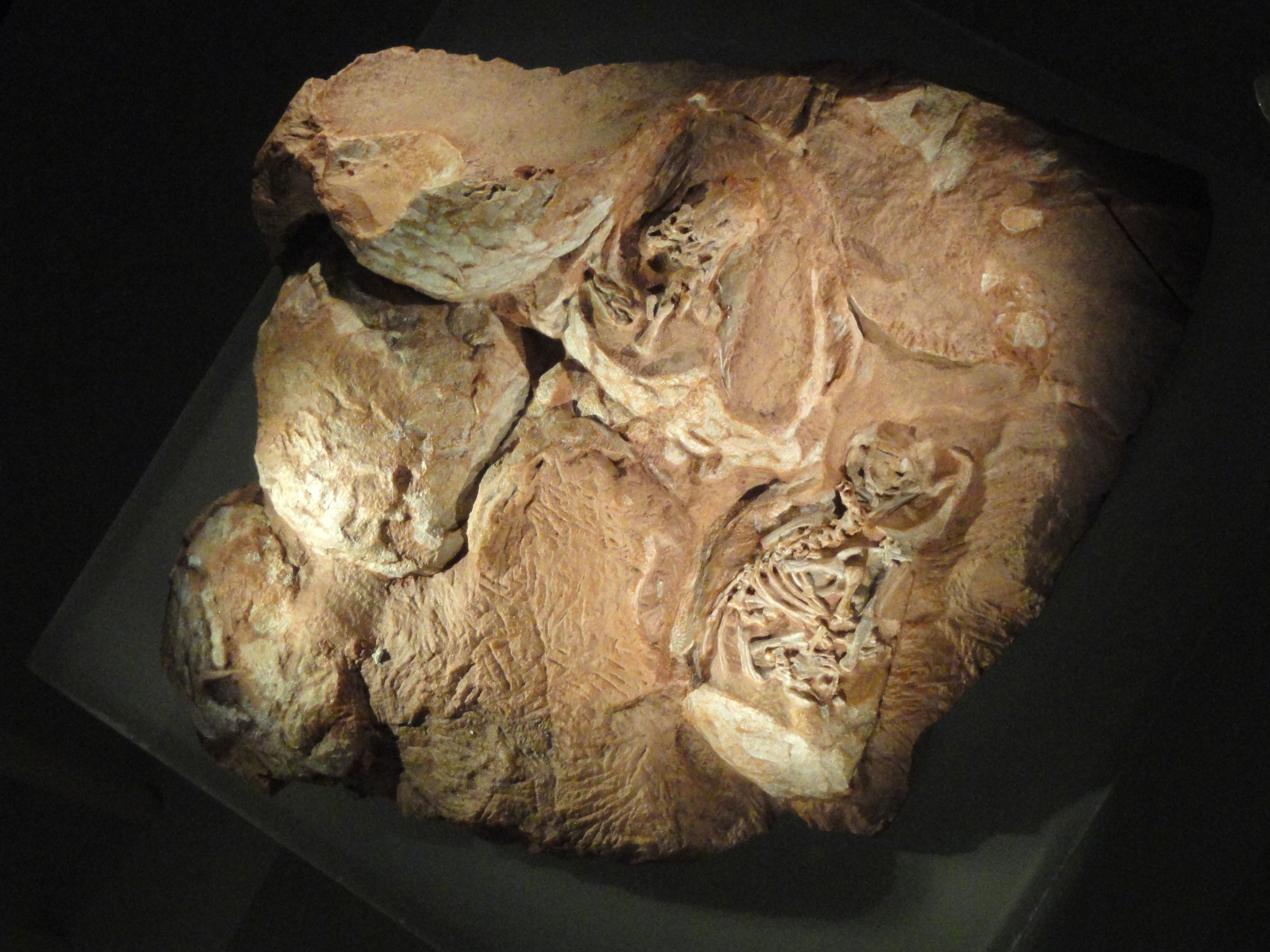
Cast of eggs and an embryo, Royal Ontario Museum

Although the Rooidraai nesting site was already discovered by Kitching in 1976, the embryos were not described before 2005. After additional excavations at the site between 2005 and 2012, Reisz and colleagues reported that 10 egg clutches from at least four fossiliferous horizons had been found, with up to 34 eggs per clutch, and that more clutches are likely present at the site. According to these authors, this indicates that this breeding site was used repeatedly by groups of animals, representing the oldest evidence of these behaviours. Sedimentary structures indicate that the breeding area was in the vicinity of a lake and has been repeatedly flooded. The arrangement of the eggs in tight rows might indicates that the eggs were pushed into this position by the adults, but nest structures are not preserved.

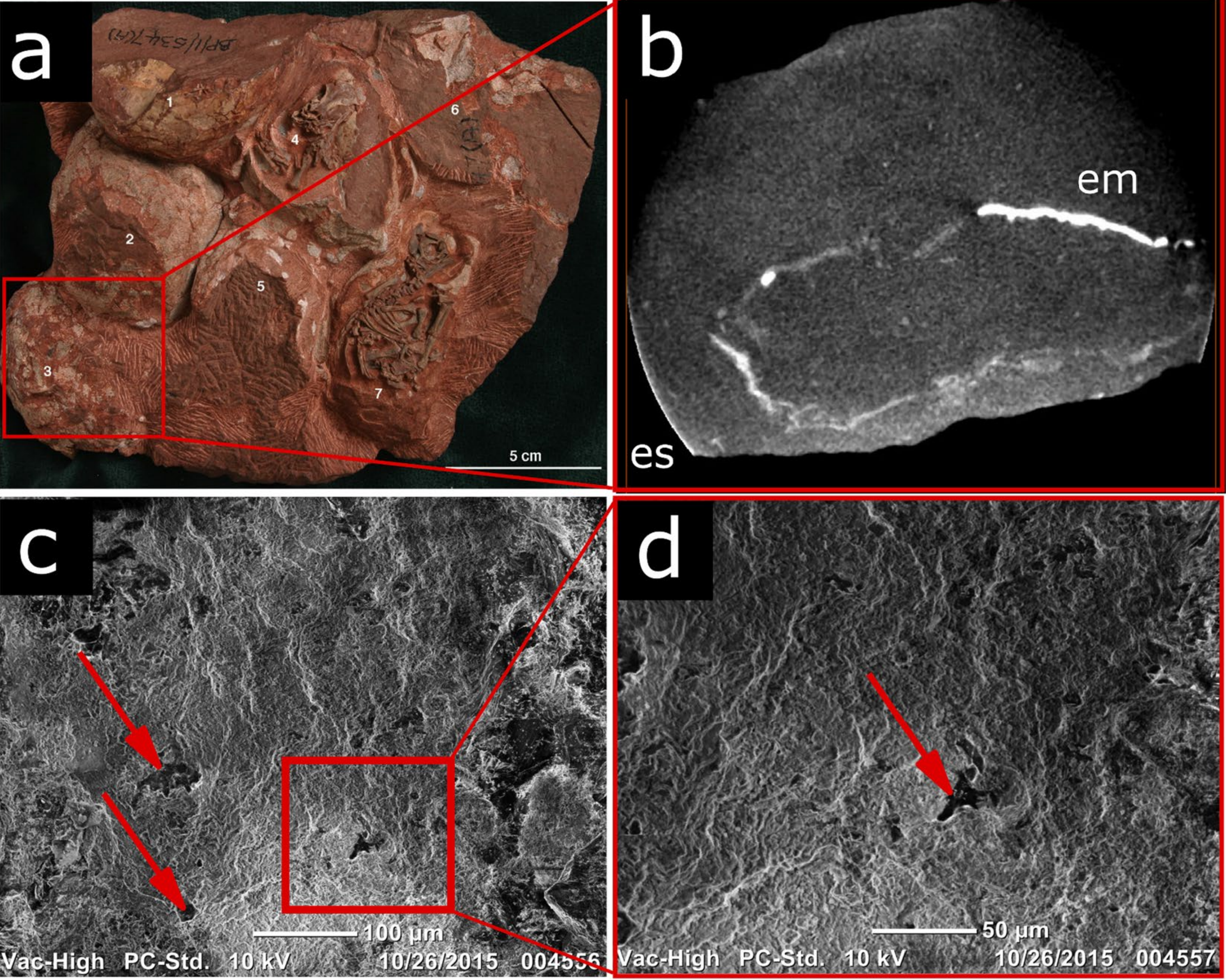
Clutch with eggs (a), CT scan of egg with eggshell labelled "es" (b), and scanning electron microscope images of eggshell with arrows indicating the pores (c–d)

Massospondylus eggs are amongst the oldest known amniote eggs from the fossil record, together with the roughly contemporaneous eggs of Lufengosaurus and Mussaurus. The eggshell consisted of a thick membrane covered by a layer of calcite that was very thin, less than 0.1 mm (0.0039 in), and had a rugged surface with few, unevenly distributed pores. Later dinosaurs had much thicker calcite layers, which must have evolved independently in the different groups. According to a 2019 study by Koen Stein and colleagues, the eggs were probably rigid rather than flexible despite their thin calcitic layers. This is because the calcite crystals interlocked with each other, and because the fossil eggshells retained their original shape. In contrast, a 2020 study by Mark Norell and colleagues argued that the eggshell of early dinosaurs such as Massospondylus was soft, as the eggshell microstructure resembles that of the soft eggs of modern turtles. The thin shells allowed for gas exchange even in a low-oxygen and carbon dioxide-rich environment, which indicates that the eggs were at least partly buried in the substrate.

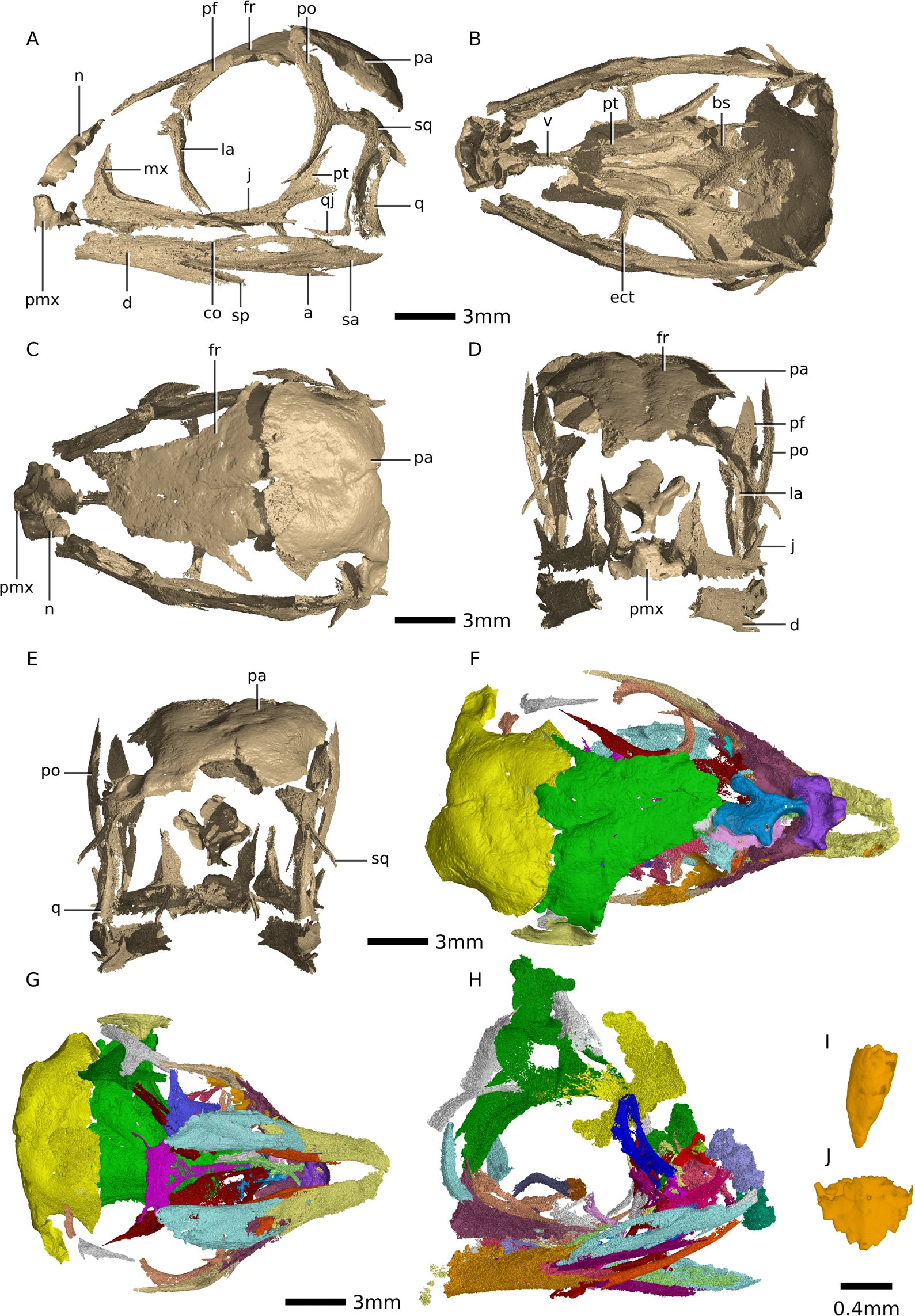
Digital reconstructions of embryonic Massospondylus skulls

The embryos are amongst the oldest dinosaur embryos ever found. (Note: Embryos of similar age, possibly belonging to the related Lufengosaurus, have since been discovered in China.) The most complete embryonic skeleton is still articulated and belonged to an individual measuring about 8.1 cm (3.2 in) in snout-vent length (body length excluding the incompletely preserved tail). In 2010, Reisz and colleagues stated that five of the seven eggs contained embryonic remains, but in 2020, Chapelle and colleagues determined that such remains are present in only three of the eggs. The empty eggs could have resulted from various factors such as lack of fertilisation, death of the embryo before the skeleton ossified, or loss during fossilisation. While the skeletal features of the embryos were similar to those of the adults, the body proportions were very dissimilar. The head was big with a short snout and very large orbits, whose diameter amounts to 39% of the entire skull length. The neck was short, in contrast to the very long neck in the adults. Girdle bones and tail vertebrae were relatively tiny. The forelimbs were of equal length to the hindlimbs and the head was proportionally very large.

In their 2005 study, Reisz and colleages suggested that the embryos were close to hatching based on their size in relation to the size of the eggs and their advanced ossification. Because the embryos lacked well-developed teeth and probably could not move around efficiently due to their body proportions, these authors proposed that they had no way of feeding themselves after hatching and possibly required parental care. In their 2020 study, Chapelle and colleagues found that the Massospondylus embryos only completed about 60% of their incubation period, as modern animals show a comparable degree of ossification of various skull bones at this stage. These researchers also detected null-generation teeth – small and simple teeth without function that would be replaced by functional teeth before hatching – again suggesting an early developmental stage of the embryos. In 2025, Ethan Mooney and colleagues described an additional clutch of embryo-containing eggs that had already been collected by Kitching but not yet been prepared and analysed. These embryos are slightly larger and more developed than the other embryos from the site, but their eggs had thinner shells, suggesting that eggshell was gradually resorbed as the embryo grew, as is the case with modern birds.

=== Possible postural shift ===
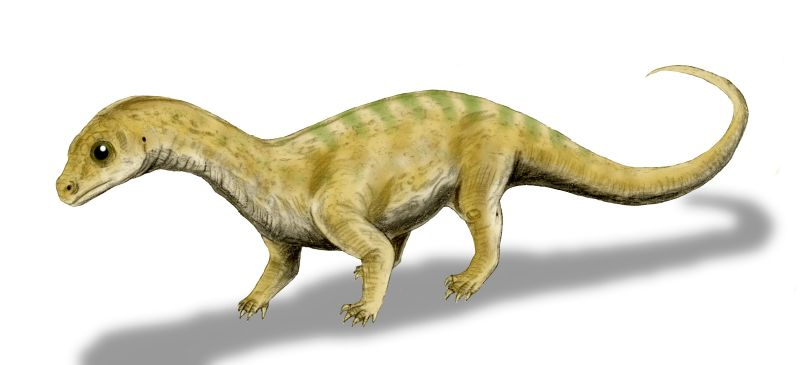
Restoration of a Massospondylus hatchling in a hypothetical quadrupedal posture

In 2005, Reisz and colleagues suggested that newly hatched Massospondylus must have been quadrupedal due to their long forelimbs and large heads, unlike the bipedal adults. The quadrupedality of the hatchings suggests that the quadrupedal posture of later sauropods may have evolved from retention of juvenile characteristics in adult animals, an evolutionary phenomenon known as paedomorphosis. Hatchlings are known from a second sauropodomorph, Mussaurus; these remains resemble those of the embryonic Massospondylus, suggesting that quadrupedality was present in newly hatched Mussaurus and presumably other basal sauropodomorphs as well. In 2012, Reisz and colleagues suggested that tracks at the same site at which the embryos were discovered were produced by juvenile Massospondylus. These tracks include both pes (hindfoot) and manus (hand) tracks, with the manus tracks rotated outwards, suggesting a quadrupedal trackmaker with unpronated hands. Only the base of the thumb is impressed, suggesting that the enlarged thumb claw was held clear off the ground. The tracks vary in size but reach up to 15 mm (0.59 in) in length, larger than the estimated 7 mm (0.28 in) of a freshly hatched individual. Reisz and colleagues therefore speculated that Massospondylus hatchlings remained at the nest sites at least until they had doubled in size.

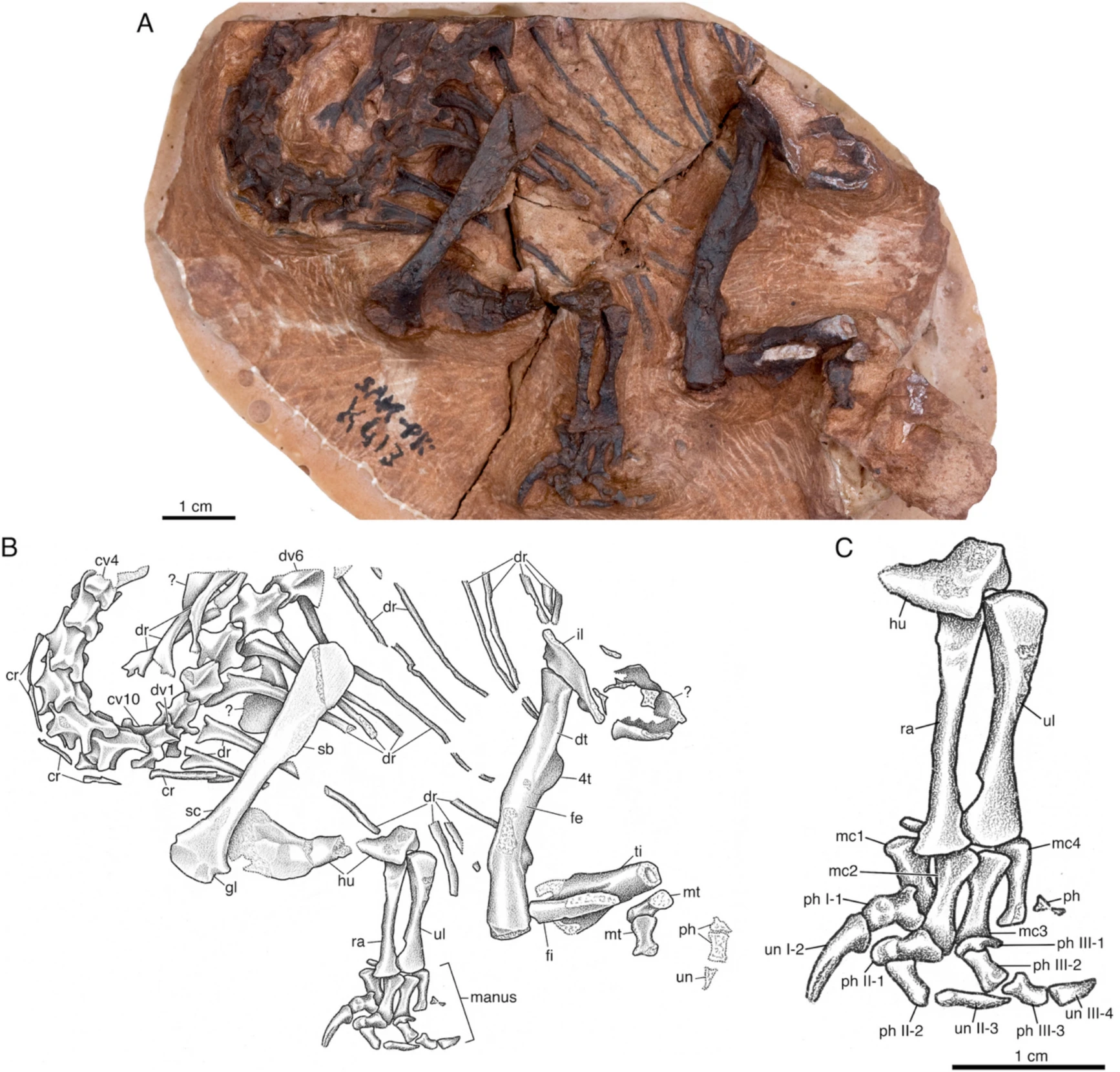
The hatchling SAM-PK-K413

In 2019, James Neenan and colleagues tested the postural shift hypothesis by analysing the bony labyrinth of the inner ear based on computed microtomography scans of eight skulls covering the age spectrum from embryo to adult. The labyrinth houses the sense of balance, and one of its three canals (the lateral semicircular canal) is roughly horizontal when the head is in an alert posture in modern animals. Since Neenan and colleagues did not observe a change in orientation of this canal during growth, no support for a postural shift was found. In a 2020 study, Chapelle and colleagues also presented evidence against the postural shift hypothesis. These researchers argued that limb length ratios cannot reliably predict posture, and instead proposed an alternative method based on the minimum circumferences of the humeri and femora. Although the posture of the analysed Massospondylus embryo was found to be ambiguous, the hatchling (SAM-PK-K413) was found to be bipedal. This hatchling would have been the size of a newly hatched individual, suggesting that Massospondylus was bipedal at all ages. Mussaurus, in contrast, was confirmed to show a postural shift from juvenile to adult. In their 2025 study, Mooney and colleagues argued that the humerus shaft of the hatchling is incompletely preserved, so that posture cannot be reliably estimated based on minimum shaft circumferences for this key individual. These authors estimated that the forelimb is 71% of the hindlimb length in a smaller embryo, 69% in their newly described larger embryo, 58% in the smallest hatchling, and 44% in the neotype specimen, the largest known individual. These estimates suggest that the forelimb shortened during growth, which supports the postural shift hypothesis.

== Palaeoecology ==
=== Distribution and abundance ===
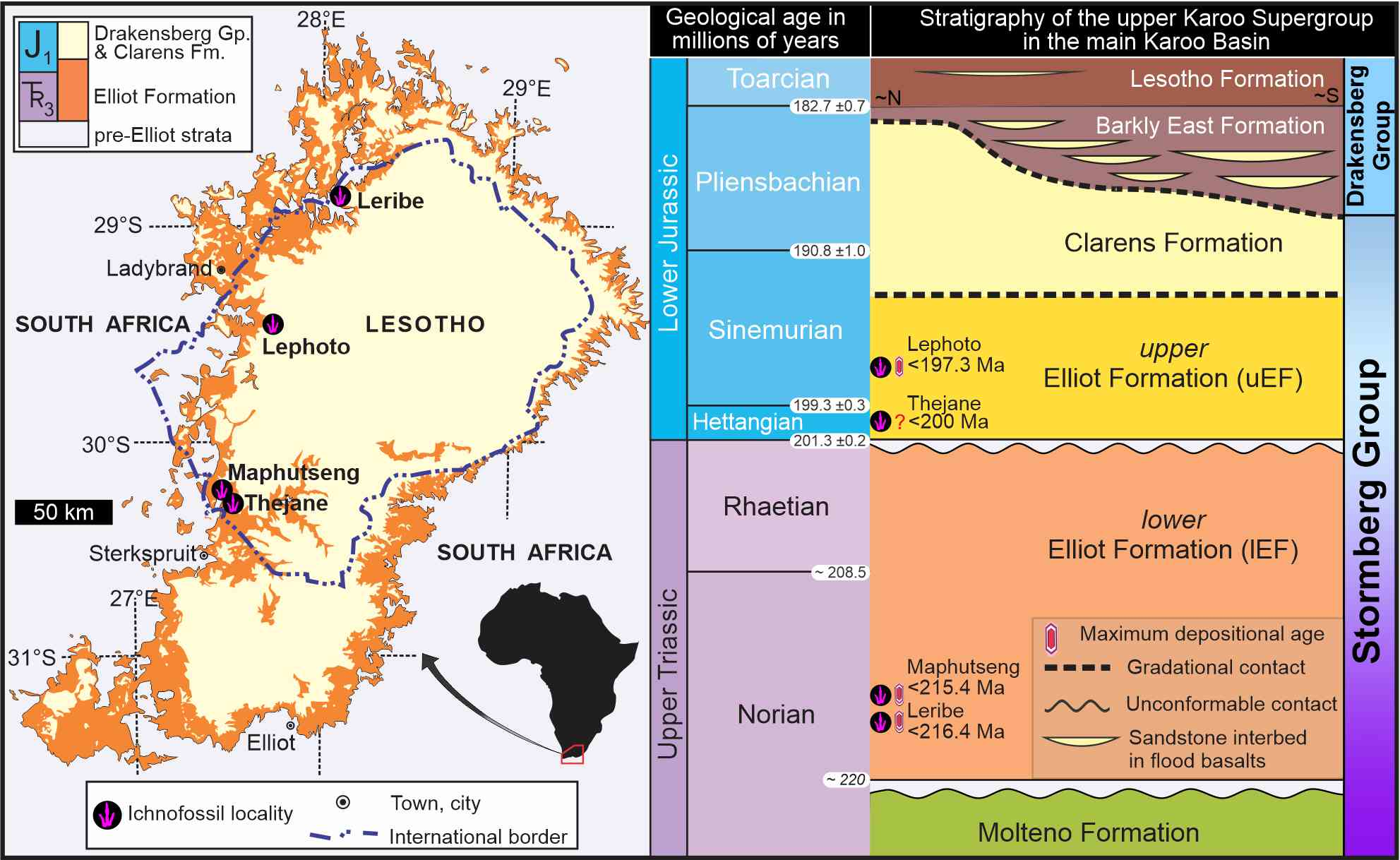
Stratigraphy of the Stormberg Group of South Africa and Lesotho. Massospondylus is found in the upper Elliot and Clarens formations.

Most Massospondylus remains have been found in the upper Elliot Formation and the Clarens Formation of South Africa and Lesotho, which are part of the Stormberg Group within the Karoo Supergroup. These formations were deposited during the Hettangian, Sinemurian, and Pliensbachian ages of the Early Jurassic, ca. 201–184 million years ago. Massospondylus has also been found in the Forest Sandstone and the Mpandi Formation of Zimbabwe, which are thought to be contemporaneous with the upper Elliot and Clarens formations.

Massospondylus is known from numerous almost complete skeletons, including at least 13 reasonably complete skulls and thousands of isolated bones and fragments. This wealth of material makes Massospondylus one of the best-known sauropodomorphs from the Early Jurassic. Because of its great abundance, it is used as the defining taxon of a biozone, the Massospondylus Range Zone, which is the uppermost such zone in the Karoo Supergroup. The presence of its fossils has been used to determine the relative ages of sedimentary rocks.

=== Palaeoenvironment ===
During the deposition of the Stormberg Group, the climate became gradually drier. The oldest part of the group (the Molteno Formation) consists of sandstones that were deposited by rivers and show evidence of heavy rainfall. As the Elliot Formation was deposited, the climate became semi-arid and the environment was characterised by short-lived rivers and lakes that deposited sandstones and mudstones. During deposition of the upper Elliot Formation, aeolian (wind) erosion and sedimentation created depressions in which playa lakes formed. The overlying Clarens Formation consists mostly of aeolian sandstones deposited by dunes in a desert environment.

The faunas and floras of the Early Jurassic were similar worldwide, with conifers adapted for hot weather becoming the common plants; basal sauropodomorphs and theropods were the main constituents of a worldwide dinosaur fauna. Massospondylus was a contemporary of temnospondyli; turtles; a sphenodont; early crocodylomorphs; cynodonts; and early mammaliforms. Predatory dinosaurs included the small theropod Megapnosaurus as well as the 6-metre-long theropod Dracovenator, which might have preyed on the sauropodomorphs. Several genera of early ornithischians are known, such as Lesothosaurus and the heterodontosaurids Abrictosaurus, Heterodontosaurus, Lycorhinus and Pegomastax. Until recently, M. carinatus was regarded as the only known sauropodomorph from the upper Elliot and Clarens formations. However, newer finds revealed a diverse contemporary sauropodomorph fauna with at least seven additional species from the upper Elliot Formation, including Aardonyx celestae, Antetonitrus ingenipes, Ignavusaurus rachelis, Arcusaurus pereirabdalorum, Pulanesaura eocollum, Ngwevu intloko, as well as a second species of Massospondylus, M. kaalae.
