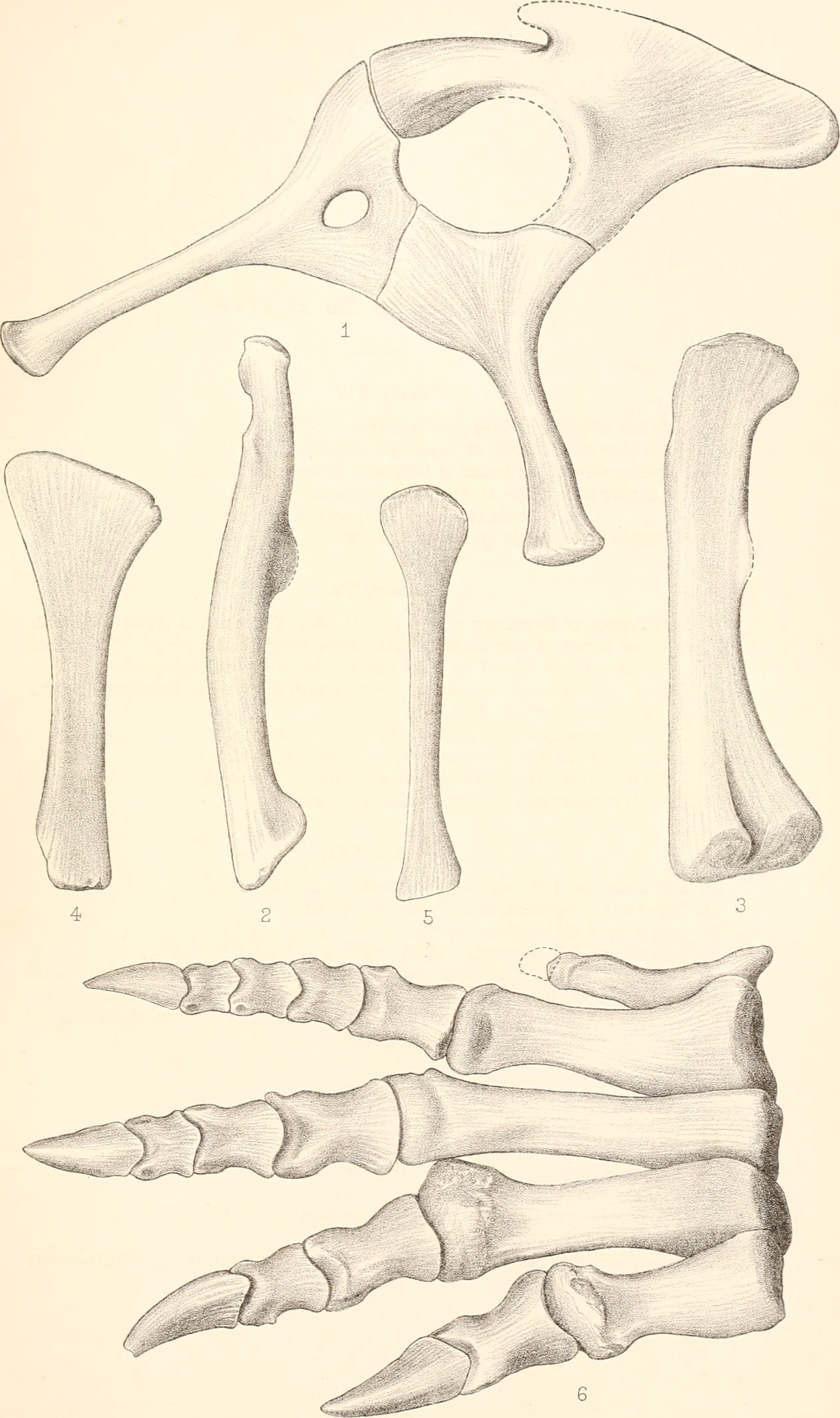
- Part of the holotype

Scientific classification
- Kingdom: Animalia
- Phylum: Chordata
- Class: Reptilia
- Clade: Dinosauria
- Clade: Saurischia
- Clade: †Sauropodomorpha
- Clade: †Massopoda
- Family: †Gryponychidae; Huene, 1932
- Genus: †Gryponyx; Broom, 1911
- Species: †G. africanus

Binomial name
- †Gryponyx africanus Broom, 1911

= Gryponyx =

Gryponyx Temporal range: Lower Jurassic Hettangian–Sinemurian

Extinct genus of dinosaur from early Jurassic South Africa

Gryponyx (meaning "hooked-claw") is a genus of massopod sauropodomorph from the Lower Jurassic of southern Free State, central South Africa.

== Description ==
Gryponyx africanus is known from the holotype SAM 3357-59, a nearly complete postcranial skeleton which includes partial vertebral column, pelvis, both forelimbs and both hindlimbs. Gryponyx has been estimated to have been about 5 m (16 ft) in length. It was collected from the Upper Elliot Formation of the Stormberg Group (Karoo Basin), dating to the Hettangian to Sinemurian stages of the Lower Jurassic period.

It was originally described by Broom (1911) as a theropod. Huene (1932) named the family Gryponychidae to contain Gryponyx and Aetonyx and placed it within Carnosauria. Galton and Cluver synonymized G. africanus with Massospondylus harriesi in 1976, which was in turn synonymized by Michael Cooper in 1981 with Massospondylus carinatus (and today M. harriesi is considered to be a nomen dubium). However, Vasconcelos and Yates (2004) found Gryponyx to be distinctive enough from other basal sauropodomorphs to be placed in its own genus. They found that it differs from other taxa by the following characteristics: total length of metacarpal I exceeds maximum proximal width and a long, narrow pubic apron with straight lateral margins. Although this publication wasn't formal, they conducted a cladistic analysis using Yates (2004) sauropodomorph matrix and found Gryponyx to be the most basal massospondylid. The same result was found by Lü Junchang et al. (2010). Yates et al. (2010) recovered Gryponyx in a trichotomy with Massospondylidae and Anchisauria. However, Gryponyx has yet to be formally redescribed.

Two additional species of Gryponyx have been described: G. transvaalensis was described on the basis of finger bones and the anterior limb metatarsals from the Late Triassic Bushveld Sandstone Formation, Transvaal. G. taylori was described on the basis of sacral and pelvic rim from the Upper Elliot Formation, southern Free State. Galton and Cluver (1976) synonymized G. taylori with M. harriesi and considered G. transvaalensis to be a nomen dubium. Both G. taylori and G. transvaalensis were synonymized by Michael Cooper (1981) with M. carinatus and Galton and Upchurch (2004) considered them to be dubious.

== Etymology ==
Gryponyx was first named by Robert Broom in 1911 and the type species is Gryponyx africanus. The generic name is derived from grypos, Greek for "hooked" and onyx, Greek for "claw". The specific name refers to Africa, where the holotype was discovered.
