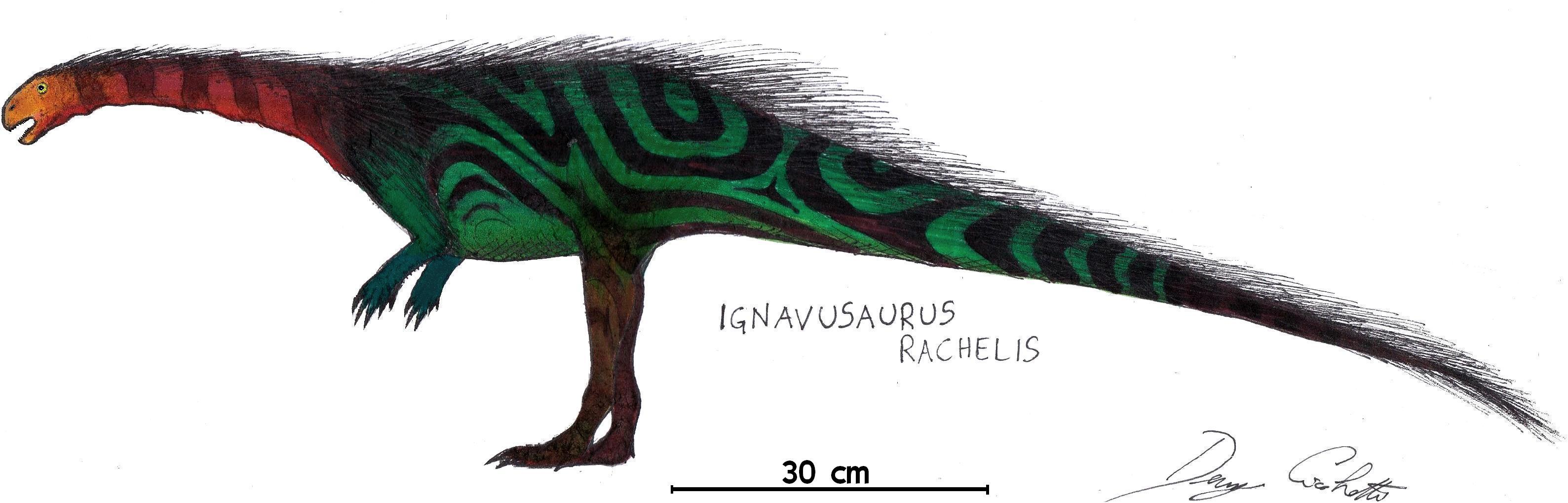
- Life reconstruction of Ignavusaurus rachelis

Scientific classification
- Kingdom: Animalia
- Phylum: Chordata
- Class: Reptilia
- Clade: Dinosauria
- Clade: Saurischia
- Clade: †Sauropodomorpha
- Clade: †Massopoda
- Genus: †Ignavusaurus; Knoll, 2010
- Species: †I. rachelis

Binomial name
- †Ignavusaurus rachelis Knoll, 2010

= Ignavusaurus =

Ignavusaurus Temporal range: Early Jurassic, 200 Ma

Extinct genus of dinosaurs from the early Jurassic in southern Africa

Ignavusaurus is an extinct monospecific genus of basal sauropodomorph dinosaur that lived during the Early Jurassic in what is now Lesotho. Its fossils were found in the Upper Elliot Formation which is probably Hettangian in age around 200 million years ago. It was described on the basis of a partial, well preserved articulated skeleton. The type species, Ignavusaurus rachelis, was described in 2010 by Spanish palaeontologist F. Knoll.

== Discovery ==
The holotype was discovered in southern Lesotho near Ha Ralekoala. The fossils were discovered in a mostly articulated state, although the skull was badly damaged, having broken into more than 120 fragments. An unpublished 2002 Ph. dissertation referred to the remains, but they were not formally described for several years, and the find remained unpublished.

In 2010, the fossils were described by F. Knoll of the Museo Nacional de Ciencias Naturales-CSIC in Madrid as a new taxon, Ignavusaurus rachelis. The fossils were brought to the National Museum of Natural History in Paris, where they were provisionally catalogued as BM HR 20; the plan was to return the fossils to Lesotho upon the opening of the Lesotho National Museum.

== Etymology ==
The generic name Ignavusaurus is derived from the Latin word ignavus ("coward") and Ancient Greek sauros ("lizard"). It refers to the type locality – Ha Ralekoala, that literally means "The place of the father of the coward". The specific name of the type species, rachelis, honours Spanish palaeontologist Raquel López-Antoñanzas.

== Description ==
The holotype had a body length of about 1.5 metres (4.9 ft) and weighed about 22.5 kilograms (50 lb). Histological analysis of the humerus and femur indicates that BM HR 20 was fast-growing individual, maybe less than one year old, based on age determination studies.

Like other early sauropodomorphs, Ignavusaurus had a long, slender neck and tail. It generally resembled Massospondylus and Melanorosaurus, two other sauropodomorphs from southern Africa, although the shape and position of the teeth, among other factors, led Knoll to conclude that the remains belong to a previously unknown genus.

== Classification ==
Ignavusaurus is a basal sauropodomorph, a member of the long-necked, herbivorous, saurischian dinosaurs. Although originally recovered as more primitive than Plateosauria by Knoll (2010), Yates et al. (2011) noted that some characters used to place Ignavusaurus outside Massopoda are reflective of juvenile status and instead are more similar to juvenile Massospondylus, considering Ignavusaurus probably synonymous with Massospondylus. Meanwhile, a cladistic analysis presented by Apaldetti et al. (2011) found Ignavusaurus to be a valid genus which is most closely related to Sarahsaurus within Massopoda, somewhat agreeing with Yates et al. that Ignavusaurus is not as primitive as originally thought. A cladistic analysis conducted by Chapelle and Choiniere (2018) in their paper updating knowledge of the skull of Massospondylus recovered Ignavusaurus along with Sarahsaurus in Massospondylidae, as did the cladistic analysis of Chapelle et al. (2019).
