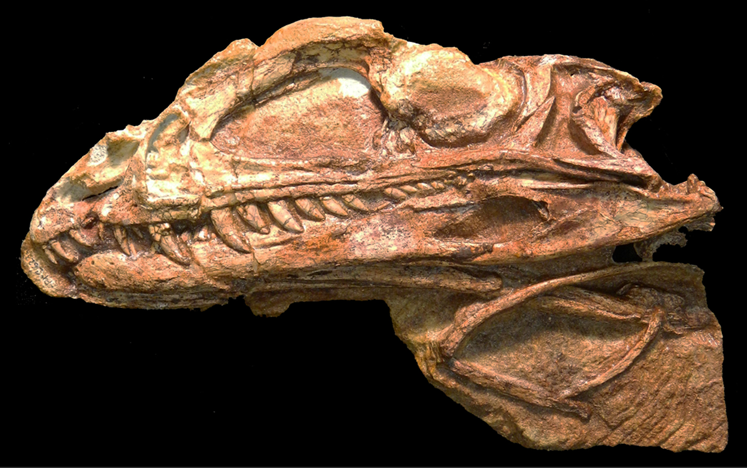
- Holotype skull MNA V2623

Scientific classification
- Kingdom: Animalia
- Phylum: Chordata
- Class: Reptilia
- Clade: Dinosauria
- Clade: Saurischia
- Clade: Theropoda
- Superfamily: †Coelophysoidea
- Genus: †Coelophysis (?)
- Species: †C.? kayentakatae

Binomial name
- †Coelophysis? kayentakatae (Rowe, 1989)

Synonyms
- Syntarsus kayentakatae Rowe, 1989 (preoccupied); Coelophysis kayentakatae (Rowe, 1989) Bristowe and Rowe, 2004; Megapnosaurus kayentakatae (Rowe, 1989) Ivie et al., 2001; Kayentavenator elysiae? Gay, 2010

= Coelophysis? kayentakatae =

Coelophysis? kayentakatae Temporal range: Early Jurassic

Extinct species of dinosaur

Coelophysis? kayentakatae is an extinct species of coelophysoid theropod dinosaur that lived approximately 200–196 million years ago during the early part of the Jurassic Period in what is now the southwestern United States. It was originally named Syntarsus kayentakatae, but the genus Syntarsus was found to be preoccupied by a colydiine beetle, so it was moved to the genus Megapnosaurus, and then to Coelophysis. A 2022 reassessment suggests that this species may require a new genus name.

== Discovery ==
The holotype of "S." kayentakatae (MNA V2623) was recovered in the Silty Facies Member of the Kayenta Formation in Arizona. This material was collected in 1977 from carbonaceous sandstone deposited during the Sinemurian and Pliensbachian stages of the Jurassic period. Specimen UCMP 128659 was discovered in 1982 and referred to Megapnosaurus kayentakatae by Rowe (1989), as a subadult gracile individual, which later agreed by Tykoski (2005). Gay (2010) described the specimen as the new tetanurine taxon Kayentavenator elysiae.

The species epithet of "S." kayentakatae refers to Dr. Kathleen Smith, nicknamed "Kayenta Kay" for her extensive work in the Kayenta Formation, which included the discovery of the type specimen of this species.

== Description ==
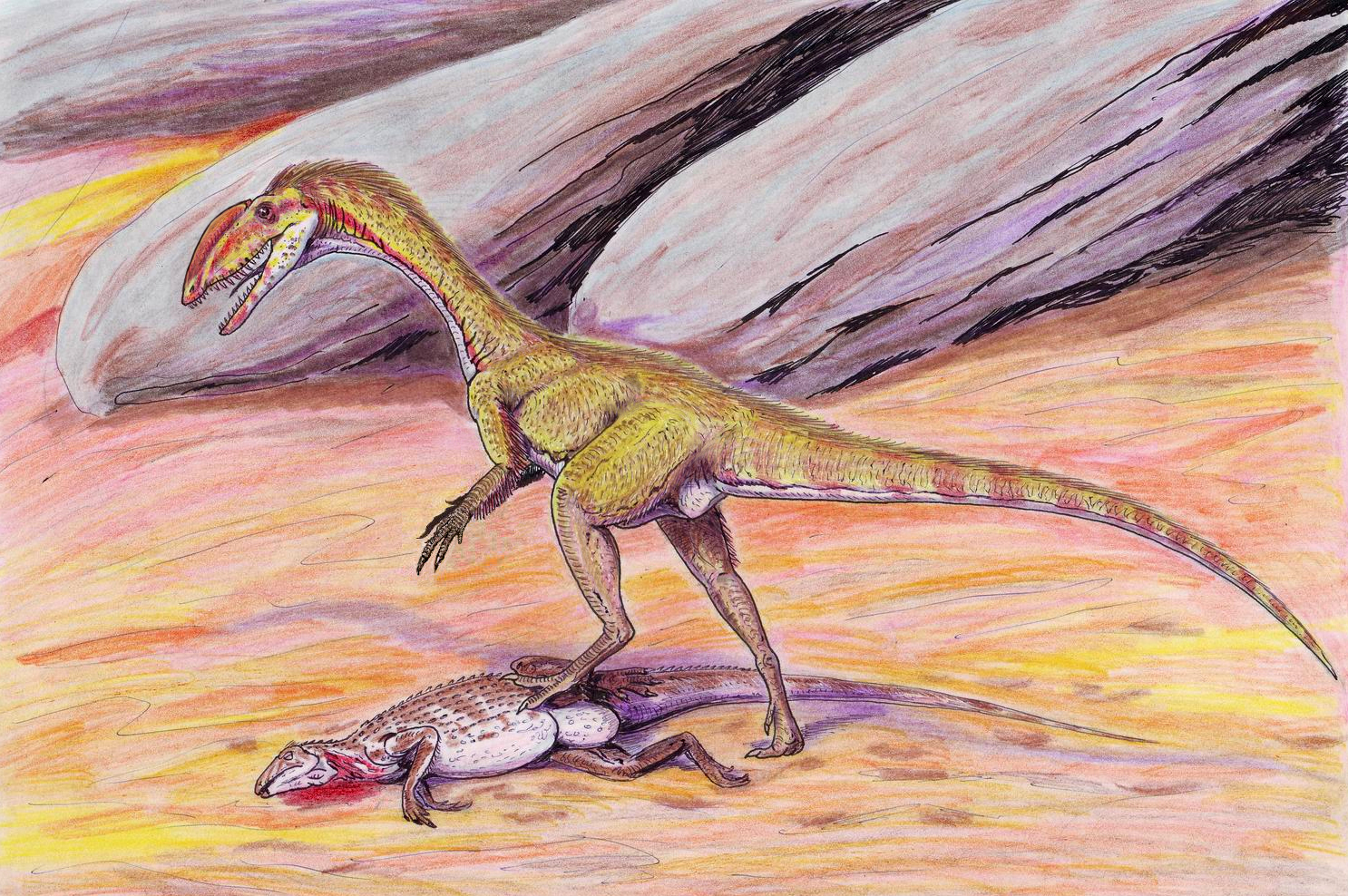
Restoration of C.? kayentakatae feeding on a Scutellosaurus

S. kayentakatae was a relatively small dinosaur, reaching 2.5 m (8.2 ft) in length and 30 kg (66 lb) in body mass. It had two small, parallel crests which may demonstrate an evolutionary step toward later and larger neotheropods, such as the more advanced and larger Dilophosaurus. Both possess a "weak joint" between the premaxillary and the maxillary bones, creating a hooked premaxillary jaw.

Specimen UCMP 128659 was discovered in 1982 and referred to Syntarsus kayentakatae by Rowe in 1989 as a subadult gracile individual, which was later agreed by Tykoski (2005). Gay (2010) classified the specimen as tetanurine Kayentavenator elysiae. Mortimer (2010) pointed out the uncertainty of whether Kayentavenator is a validly named taxon based on the rules of ICZN and the absence of published evidence that Kayentavenator is the same taxon as S. kayentakatae, while questioning whether Kayentavenator is a tetanurine. In the 2012 conference abstract, Martin Ezcurra treated Kayentavenator as a junior synonym of S. kayentakatae based on his unpublished phylogenetic matrix. In 2017, Ezcurra treated the holotype of Kayentavenator as a specimen of S. kayentakatae.

According to Tykoski and Rowe (2004) Syntarsus kayentakatae can be distinguished based on the following characteristics:

- the presence of nasal crests on the skull
- the frontal bones on the skull are separated by a midline anterior extension of the parietal bones

Furthermore, they list a transverse groove on the anterior astragalar surface, as an additional autapomorphy, however, it's also present in Coelophysis bauri and the Shake-n-Bake coelophysid.

== Classification ==
It was originally included in the genus Syntarsus along with type species Syntarsus rhodesiensis, but the name is preoccupied by a junior synonym of beetle genus Cerchanotus. The dinosaur genus was renamed Megapnosaurus in 2001. In 2004, Bristowe and Raath first proposed the synonymy of both species of Syntarsus with Coelophysis, though they were uncertain whether S. kayentakatae belonged to this genus, referring it to as ?C. kayentatakatae.

Marsh and Rowe (2020) retain the generic name Syntarsus for both QG 1 and MNA V2623, and the respective specimens assigned to these taxa, as opposed to Coelophysis or Megapnosaurus, due to systematic relationships within Coelophysoidea in flux. As such, congenericity or the need for Megapnosaurus would not be supported if Coelophysis bauri, Megapnosaurus rhodesiensis, and "Syntarsus" kayentakatae do not form respective clades, as evidenced by their phylogenetic analyses.

Ezcurra et al. (2021) found that "Syntarsus" kayentakatae was a member of the superfamily Coelophysoidea but outside the family Coelophysidae, not closely related to Coelophysis bauri or to Megapnosaurus rhodesiensis. Zhang et al. (2026) also recovered this taxon within Coelophysoidea outside Coelophysidae.

== Paleoecology ==
The Kayenta Formation is part of the Glen Canyon Group that includes formations not only in northern Arizona but also parts of southeastern Utah, western Colorado, and northwestern New Mexico. The formation was primarily deposited by rivers, with the silty facies created by the slower, more sluggish part of the river system. A definitive radiometric dating of this formation has not yet been made, and the available stratigraphic correlation has been based on a combination of radiometric dates from vertebrate fossils, magnetostratigraphy and pollen evidence.

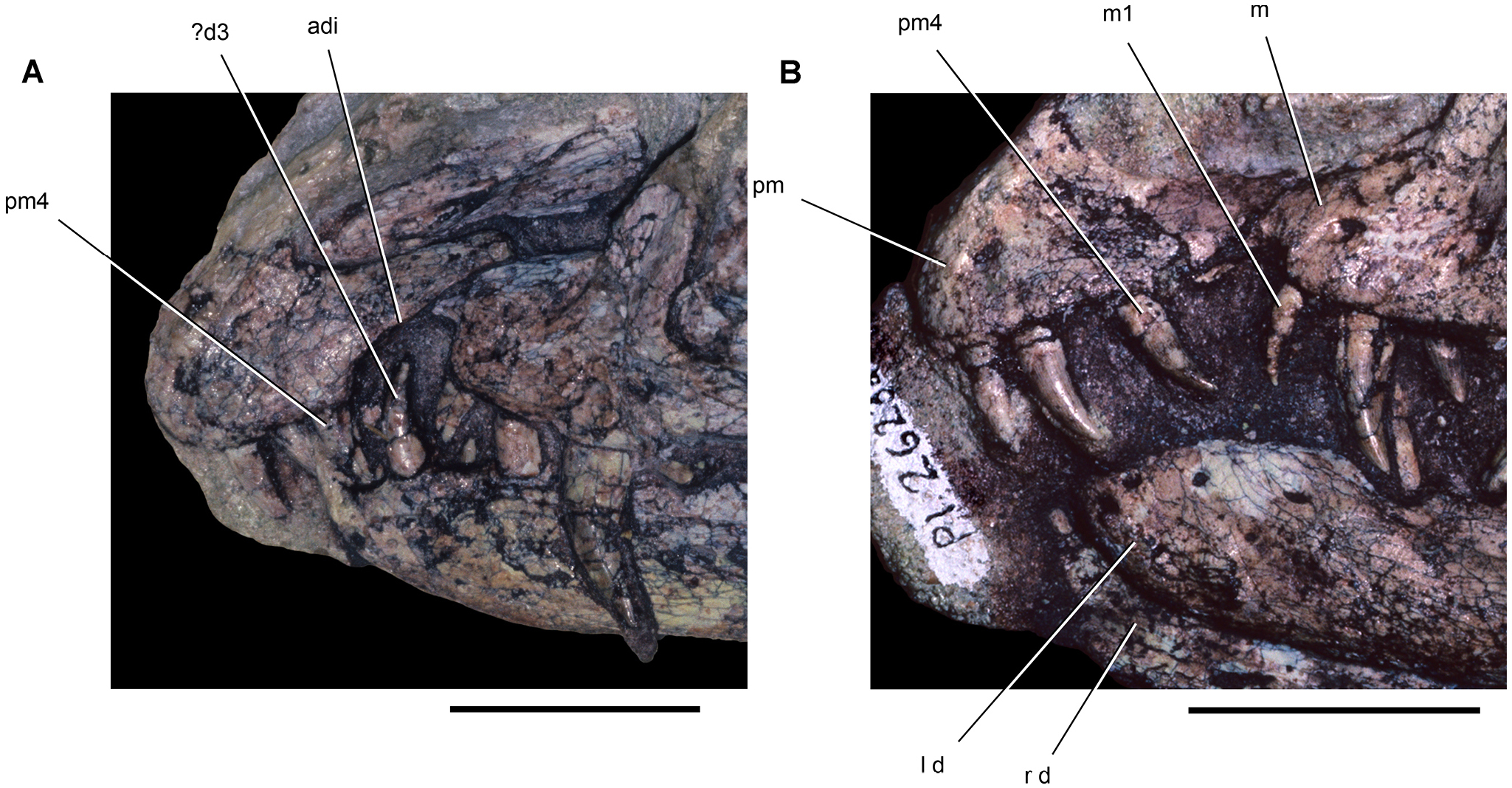
Snout and front teeth of C. bauri and C.? kayentakatae

During the Early Jurassic period, the land that is now the Kayenta Formation experienced rainy summers and dry winters. By the Middle Jurassic period it was being encroached upon from the north by a sandy dune field that would become the Navajo Sandstone. The animals here were adapted to a seasonal climate and abundant water could be found in streams, ponds and lakes. Syntarsus kayentakatae shared its paleoenvironment with other dinosaurs, such as several theropods including Dilophosaurus, Kayentavenator, the "Shake-N-Bake" theropod, the basal sauropodomorphs Sarahsaurus and Anchisaurus, heterodontosaurids, and the armored dinosaurs Scelidosaurus and Scutellosaurus. The Kayenta Formation has produced the remains of three coelophysoid taxa of different body size, representing the most diverse ceratosaur fauna yet known. The formation has also yielded a small but growing assemblage of organisms. Vertebrates present in the Kayenta Formation at the time of S. kayentakatae included hybodont sharks, indeterminate bony fish, lungfish, salamanders, the frog Prosalirus, the caecilian Eocaecilia, the turtle Kayentachelys, a sphenodontian reptile, various lizards, and the pterosaur Rhamphinion. Also present were the synapsids Dinnebitodon, Kayentatherium, Oligokyphus, morganucodontans, the possible early true mammal Dinnetherium, and a haramiyid mammal. Several early crocodylomorphs were also present, including Calsoyasuchus, Eopneumatosuchus, Kayentasuchus, and Protosuchus. Vertebrate trace fossils from this area include coprolites and the tracks of therapsids, lizard-like animals, and dinosaurs. Non-vertebrates in this ecosystem included microbial or "algal" limestone, freshwater bivalves, freshwater mussels and snails, and ostracods. The plant life known from this area included trees that became preserved as petrified wood.

=== Taphonomy ===
The holotype (MNA V2623) of "Syntarsus" kayentakatae came to rest on its left side and was partially buried. This served to stabilize the bones on the left side of the skull; however, the right side of the skull was likely exposed to water currents as it began to decompose. Some of the loosely connected bones on this side drifted out of place before the entire skull was finally buried. Later, the great weight of overlying sediment served to distort the specimen.
