= Kayentavenator =

Kayentavenator Temporal range: Early Jurassic, 189 Ma

Scientific classification
- Kingdom: Animalia
- Phylum: Chordata
- Class: Reptilia
- Clade: Dinosauria
- Clade: Saurischia
- Clade: Theropoda
- Clade: Tetanurae
- Genus: †Kayentavenator; Gay, 2010
- Species: †K. elysiae

Binomial name
- †Kayentavenator elysiae Gay, 2010

Extinct genus of dinosaurs

Kayentavenator (meaning "Kayenta hunter") is a genus of small carnivorous tetanuran dinosaur that lived during the Early Jurassic Period. Fossils were recovered from the Kayenta Formation of northeastern Arizona, and were described in 2010.

== Description ==
The holotype specimen of K. elysiae is a juvenile, as shown by unfused neural spines and would have stood about 0.5 metres (1.6 ft) high at the hip. The adult size of Kayentavenator is unknown. The inclusion of a pubic fenestra is one of the characteristics that Gay uses to set Kayentavenator apart from the contemporaneous, and better known Dilophosaurus. As Dilophosaurus lacks a pubic fenestra as a subadult or an adult, it is unlikely that it had one during any stage of ontogeny. Apomorphies include an ellipsoid acetabulum, the greater trochanter and the head of the femur having been fused, a mediodistal crest that extends 50% of the length of the femur, as well as a prominent accessory condyle on the medial femoral condyle, a groove in dorsal surface of the femoral head that extends out from the centerline of the body, and highly constricted ("waisted") caudal vertebra centra.

=== Discovery ===
The only known fossils of Kayentavenator were excavated by the University of California Museum of Paleontology from the Navajo Reservation in Arizona. It was briefly described in 2003 and was fully described in 2010 based on a partial fossil skeleton, consisting of part of the pelvis, partial hindlimbs, and vertebrae.

Cladogram of Theropods (Gay 2010)

- - Theropoda
    - Herrerasaurus
    - Ceratosauria
      - - void
          Coelophysidae
        - - Carnotaurus
          - Dilophosaurus
          - Ceratosaurus
    - - Tetanurae
        - void
          Kayentavenator
        - - - void
              Allosaurus
            - Tyrannosauridae
            - Dromaeosauridae
            - Aves

=== Classification ===
Timothy Rowe originally assigned the holotype specimen of Kayentavenator to the coelophysoid Syntarsus kayentakatae (now Megapnosaurus kayentakatae or Coelophysis kayentakatae). It is unlikely that Kayentavenator is actually congeneric with Megapnosaurus kayentakatae due to the number of tetanuran characters that Kayentavenator possesses and M. kayentakatae lacks, such as the pubic fenestra and a sharp ridge on the medial side of the tibia. A cladistic analysis of the remains showed Kayentavenator to lie outside of Coelophysidae, and was closer to Allosaurus. This would make Kayentavenator the oldest known tetanuran from North America. The fragmentary remains of Kayentavenator make this open to further interpretation.

Mortimer (2010) noted the uncertainty of whether Kayentavenator is a validly named taxon based on the rules of ICZN and the absence of published evidence that Kayentavenator is the same taxon as S. kayentakatae, while questioning whether Kayentavenator is a tetanurine. In the 2012 conference abstract, Martin Ezcurra treated Kayentavenator as a junior synonym of S. kayentakatae based on his unpublished phylogenetic matrix. In 2017, Ezcurra treated the holotype of Kayentavenator as a specimen of S. kayentakatae.

== Paleoecology ==
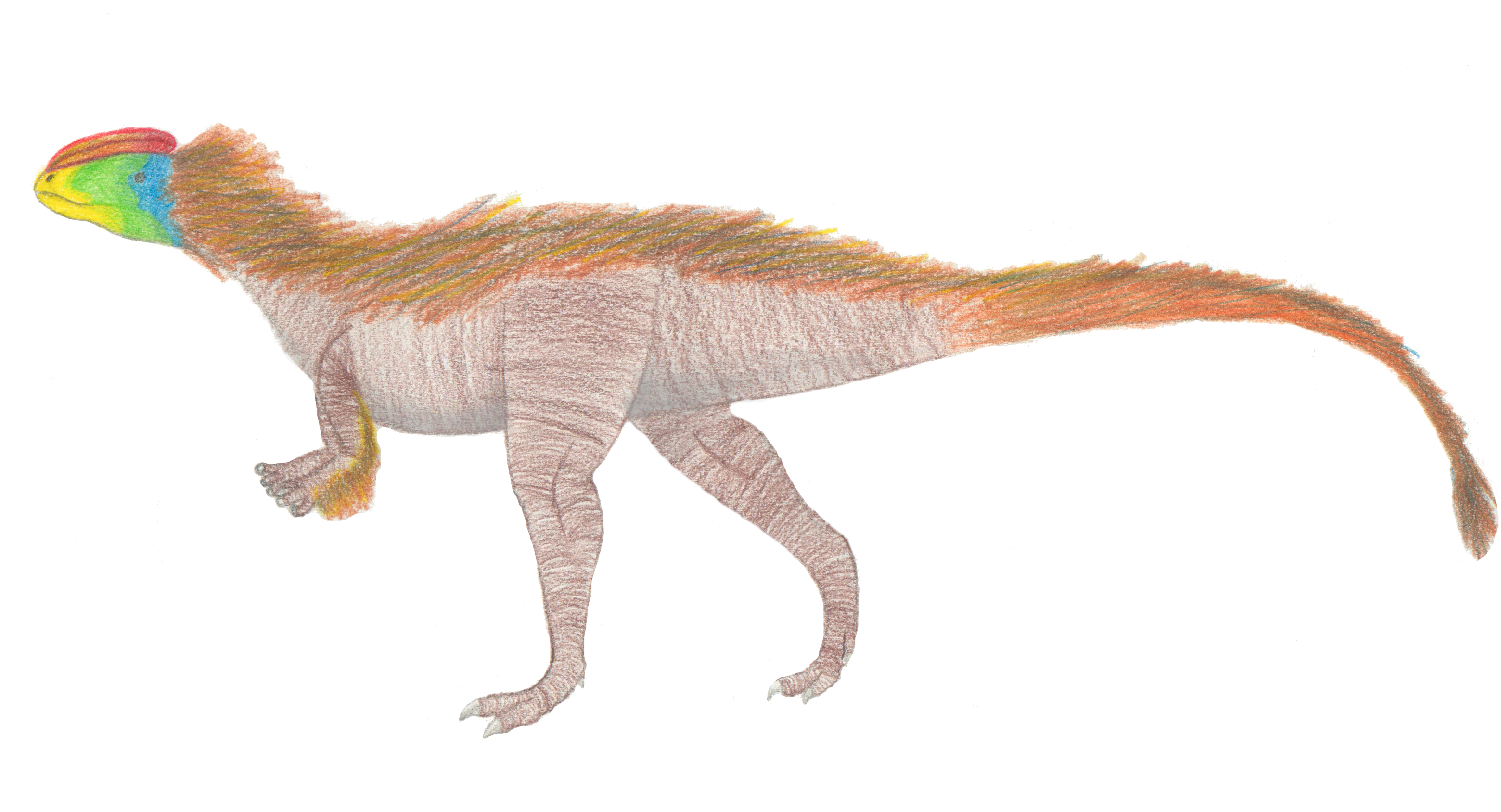
Hypothetical life reconstruction

=== Habitat ===
The only known specimen of Kayentavenator, UCMP V128659, was recovered from the Silty Facies Member of the Kayenta Formation, in northeastern Arizona. A definitive radiometric dating of this formation has not yet been made, and the available stratigraphic correlation has been based on a combination of radiometric dates from vertebrate fossils, magnetostratigraphy, and pollen evidence. It has been surmised that the Kayenta Formation was deposited during the Sinemurian and Pliensbachian stages of the Early Jurassic Period or approximately 199 to 182 million years ago. The Kayenta Formation is part of the Glen Canyon Group that includes formations not only in northern Arizona but also parts of southeastern Utah, western Colorado, and northwestern New Mexico. The formation was primarily deposited by rivers. During the Early Jurassic period, the land that is now the Kayenta Formation experienced rainy summers and dry winters. By the Middle Jurassic period it was being encroached upon from the north by a sandy dune field that would become the Navajo Sandstone. The animals were adapted to a seasonal climate and abundant water could be found in streams, ponds and lakes.

=== Paleofauna ===
Kayentavenator shared its paleoenvironment with other dinosaurs, such as several theropods including Dilophosaurus, Coelophysis kayentakatae, and the "Shake N Bake" theropod, the basal sauropodomorph Sarahsaurus, heterodontosaurids, and the armored dinosaurs Scelidosaurus and Scutellosaurus. The Kayenta Formation has produced the remains of three coelophysoid taxa of different body size, representing the most diverse ceratosaur fauna yet known. The Kayenta Formation has yielded a small but growing assemblage of organisms. Vertebrates present in the Kayenta Formation at the time of Kayentavenator included hybodont sharks, indeterminate bony fish, lungfish, salamanders, the frog Prosalirus, the caecilian Eocaecilia, the turtle Kayentachelys, a sphenodontian reptile, various lizards, and the pterosaur Rhamphinion. Also present were the synapsids Dinnebitodon, Kayentatherium, Oligokyphus, morganucodontids, the possible early true mammal Dinnetherium, and a haramiyid mammal. Several early crocodylomorphs were present including Calsoyasuchus, Eopneumatosuchus, Kayentasuchus and Protosuchus.

Vertebrate trace fossils from this area included coprolites and the tracks of therapsids, lizard-like animals, and dinosaurs, which provided evidence that these animals were also present. Non-vertebrates in this ecosystem included microbial or "algal" limestone, freshwater bivalves, freshwater mussels and snails, and ostracods. The plant life known from this area included trees that became preserved as petrified wood.
