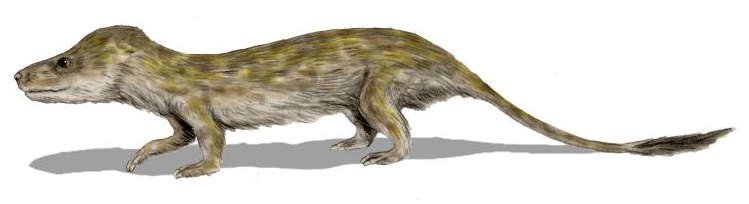
- Life restoration of O. triserialis

Scientific classification
- Kingdom: Animalia
- Phylum: Chordata
- Clade: Synapsida
- Clade: Therapsida
- Clade: Cynodontia
- Family: †Tritylodontidae
- Genus: †Oligokyphus; Hennig, 1922

Type species
- Oligokyphus triserialis Hennig E, 1922

Species
- †O. triserialis Hennig E, 1922; †O. major Kühne WG, 1956; †O. lufengensis Luo Z & Sun A, 1994

Synonyms
- Chalepotherium plieningeri; Mucrotherium; Uniserium

= Oligokyphus =

Oligokyphus Temporal range: Late Triassic–Early Jurassic

Extinct genus of mammaliamorphs

Oligokyphus ("few cusps") is an extinct genus of herbivorous tritylodontid cynodont known from the Late Triassic to Early Jurassic of Europe, Asia and North America.

== Discovery and naming ==
Oligokyphus was named by Edwin Hennig in 1922 on the basis of two teeth from Württemberg, Germany. The name of the genus is derived from Greek ὀλιγος "few" and κυφος "hump", and is a calque of Paucituberculata, the group in which Oligokyphus was initially classified, from Latin into Greek. Like Tritylodon, Oligokyphus was originally classified as a mammal. Hennig initially recognized two species, which he named Oligokyphus triserialis and Oligokyphus biserialis based on the number of rows of cusps, though he acknowledged this distinction as provisional.

The next discoveries of Oligokyphus were made in the United Kingdom. The German paleontologist Walter Georg Kühne traveled to the United Kingdom in 1938 with the goal of collecting early mammal specimens. The outbreak of World War II led to Kühne's internment on the Isle of Man, during which time he prepared and studied the collected material. Kühne initially identified the specimens as Tritylodon. His discovery that the specimens lacked the dentary-squamosal jaw joint, at the time viewed as the defining characteristic of mammals, led him to conclude that tritylodontids were "mammal-like reptiles", though he recognized that they were close to the origin of mammals. Kühne's detailed description of the material was published in 1956, and made Oligokyphus the best-known tritylodontid. Kühne regarded two different size classes of adult as being present. Though he acknowledged the differences could be due to sexual dimorphism, he proposed that they represented two distinct species, which he named Oligokyphus major and Oligokyphus minor. In 1985, the genus was reported from the Early Jurassic Kayenta Formation in the United States. In 1994, the species O. lufengensis was described from the Lower Jurassic Lufeng Formation of China. In 2015, indeterminate remains of the genus were described from the McCoy Brook Formation of eastern Canada, dating to the latest Triassic (Rhaetian).

== Description ==
Oligokyphus were relatively small tritylodontids, with a skull up to 90 mm long and an estimated body mass of 3.4 kg. There may have been some sexual dimorphism in size.

=== Skull and jaw ===
The teeth of the upper and lower jaw contain bump rows that fit together perfectly in order to maintain an accurate bite. Oligokyphus had a face similar to that of modern mammals, although there were differences in the cheekbones and eye sockets. It had a bony secondary palate and double-rooted cheek teeth. Unlike mammals, the teeth of Oligokyphus did not occlude. The jaw was double jointed, and the neck was flexible, with an atlas and axis and a double occipital condyle.

The teeth were different from those of related cynodonts; there were no canine teeth, and unusually large, rodent-like incisors. There is a large gap, or diastema, separating the cheek teeth from the incisors. The lower jaw of these animals moved back and forth when the mouth was shut so that the food could be chopped up. Oligokyphus had no premaxilla, but did have a lateral extension of the maxilla.

While the postcanines in non-mammalians, such as Oligokyphus, are difficult to differentiate from canines, the lower postcanines of Oligokyphus (also considered to be pre-molars) are defining from other Tritylodonts. On lower postcanine teeth of Trityldonts, two cusps can be found per row; however, Oligokyphus have two rows with three cusps in each row. These cusps, specific to Oligokyphus Tritylodonts, allowed for a well-fitting bite that was particularly good at shredding plant material dense in fiber. The foremost incisors are similar to those of today's rodents, extremely intensified and enlarged. The typical location of canine teeth is left empty with Oligokyphus. Instead, a gap is inserted in this area of the jaw as Oligokyphus lack the teeth commonly known as canines.

== Cladistics/phylogeny ==
Oligokyphus is in the family Tritylodontidae. The family is named after the shape of their teeth. Tritylodontidae means "three knob teeth". The members of this family were all small to medium-sized advanced synapsids with combined specialized structures for herbivorous eating. The first Tritylodont was found in South Africa in upper Jurassic rocks. It was first thought to be one of the earliest mammals. This classification has since been adjusted. These non-mammals became progressively more mammal-like. They are now classified as the closest relatives to the mammals and this is supported by their high, flat, crested jaw, large zygomatic arches, well developed secondary palate, and specialized dentition.

There have also been comparisons between the cranial nerves of Tritylodonts and mammals. The shoulder girdle and forelimb structures were suggestive of digging animals. These animals were extremely active and burrowed in leaf litter and dirt, which suggests characteristics of rodents and rabbits. They naturally had a metabolism that was partially or completely endothermic. They were thought to be driven out by relatives such as mammals competing for the same ecological niches. Another reason that this animal could have gone extinct was due to new plant developments. Some flowering plants, or angiosperms, could have been detrimental to these animals since they may not have been used to eating them.

== Paleoecology ==
=== Habitat ===
Oligokyphus were small tetrapod, terrestrial animals. They have long been considered as mammaliomorphs, a link between earlier synapsids and modern mammals. It is believed these animals were primarily land dwelling, living amongst small shrubs or bushes. It is also thought that Oligokyphus fed on seeds or nuts, as their teeth resemble those of modern animals that also feed on seeds and nuts. It is rather difficult to estimate the social behaviors of Oligokyphus as most of it does not preserve in the fossil record. However, considering the conditions on the planet during the times that Oligokyphus was alive and thriving (late Triassic and early Jurassic) and also the locations of which fossils of these animals were found, some educated predictions can be made about their metabolism and feeding habits. Oligokyphus, with its conveniently placed leg and hip structures, likely was quick-moving and fed off of low-lying plant life. With its long weasel-like body, it may have even been possible for Oligokyphus to reach higher vegetation simply by standing on its hind legs. It probably had good use of its hands to manipulate seeds and other digestively pleasing foods. There has not been any support showing Oligokyphus had the ability to climb vertically, as some rodents are capable of doing today.

A definitive radiometric dating of the area preserved in the formation where Oligokyphus lived has not yet been made, and the available stratigraphic correlation has been based on a combination of radiometric dates from vertebrate fossils, magnetostratigraphy and pollen evidence. It has been surmised that the Kayenta Formation was deposited during the Sinemurian and Pliensbachian stages of the Early Jurassic Period or approximately 199 to 182 million years ago. This formation is part of the Glen Canyon Group that includes formations not only in northern Arizona but also parts of southeastern Utah, western Colorado, and northwestern New Mexico. The formation was primarily deposited by rivers. During the Early Jurassic period, the land that is now the Kayenta Formation experienced rainy summers and dry winters. By the Middle Jurassic period it was being encroached upon from the north by a sandy dune field that would become the Navajo Sandstone. The animals here were adapted to a seasonal climate and abundant water could be found in streams, ponds and lakes.

=== Paleofauna ===
==== North America ====
Oligokyphus lived beneath the feet of dinosaurs, such as the theropods Dilophosaurus, Kayentavenator Coelophysis? kayentakatae, the basal sauropodomorph Sarahsaurus, heterodontosaurids, and the armored dinosaur Scutellosaurus (the same applied for Europe and Asia). The Kayenta Formation has produced that remains of three coelophysoid taxa of different body size, which represents the most diverse ceratosaur fauna yet known. The Kayenta Formation has yielded a small but growing assemblage of organisms. Vertebrates present here at the time of Oligokyphus included hybodont sharks, bony fish known as osteichthyes, lungfish, salamanders, the frog Prosalirus, the caecilian Eocaecilia, the turtle Kayentachelys, a sphenodontian reptile, and various lizards. Also present were the synapsids Dinnebiton and Kayentatherium, several early crocodylomorphs including Calsoyasuchus, Eopneumatosuchus, Kayentasuchus, and Protosuchus), and the pterosaur Rhamphinion. The possible presence of the early true mammal Dinnetherium, and a haramyid mammal has also been proposed, based on fossil finds. Vertebrate trace fossils from this area included coprolites and the tracks of therapsids, lizard-like animals, and dinosaurs, which provided evidence that these animals were also present. Non-vertebrates in this ecosystem included microbial or "algal" limestone, freshwater bivalves, freshwater mussels and snails, and ostracods. The plant life known from this area included trees that became preserved as petrified wood.
