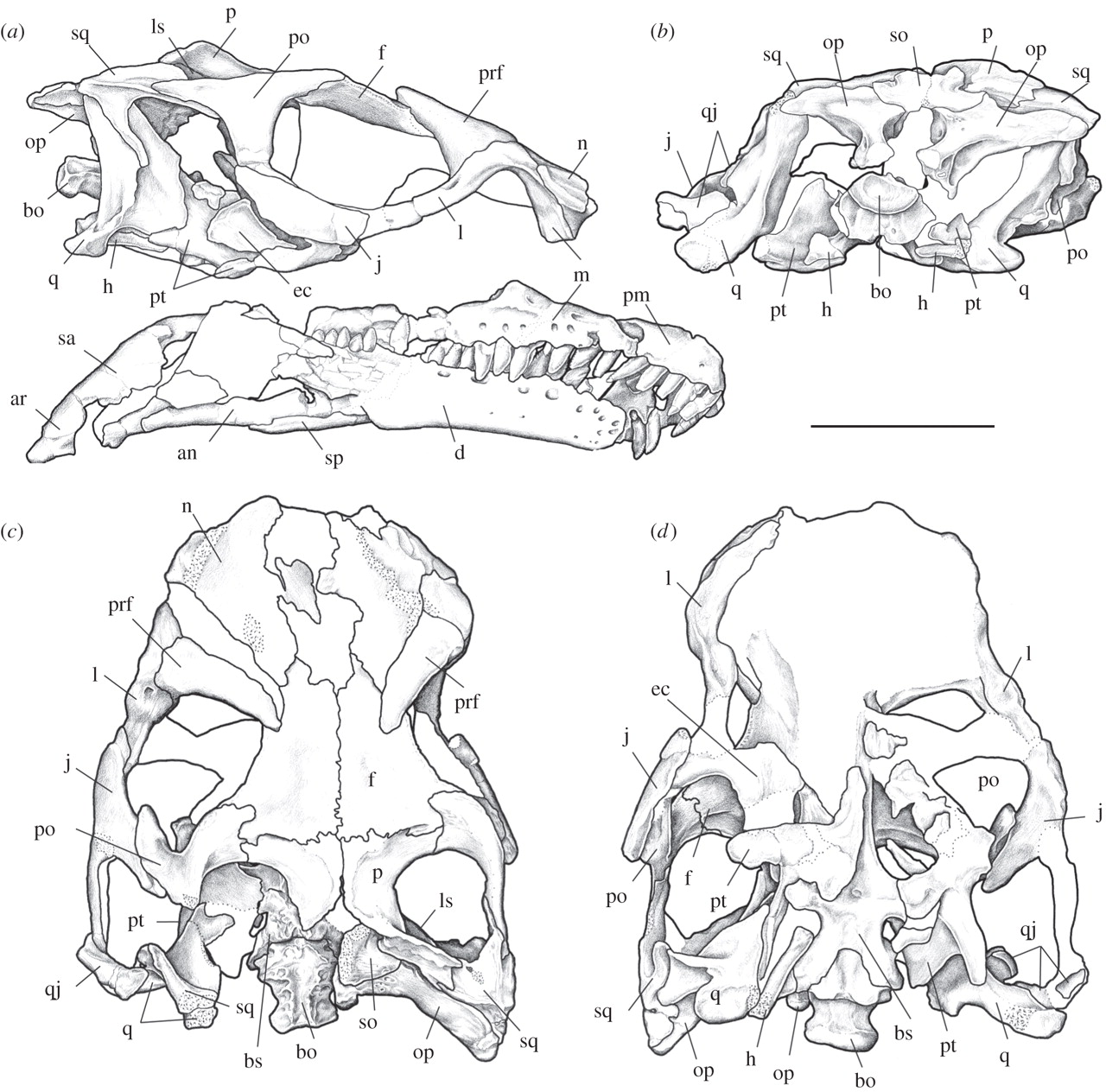
- Illustration of the skull in multiple views

Scientific classification
- Kingdom: Animalia
- Phylum: Chordata
- Class: Reptilia
- Clade: Dinosauria
- Clade: Saurischia
- Clade: †Sauropodomorpha
- Clade: †Massopoda
- Genus: †Sarahsaurus; Rowe, Sues & Reisz, 2011
- Species: †S. aurifontanalis

Binomial name
- †Sarahsaurus aurifontanalis Rowe, Sues & Reisz, 2011

= Sarahsaurus =

Sarahsaurus Temporal range: Early Jurassic, 199.3–182.7 Ma

Extinct genus of dinosaurs

Sarahsaurus is a genus of basal sauropodomorph dinosaur which lived during the Early Jurassic period in what is now northeastern Arizona, United States.

== Discovery and naming ==
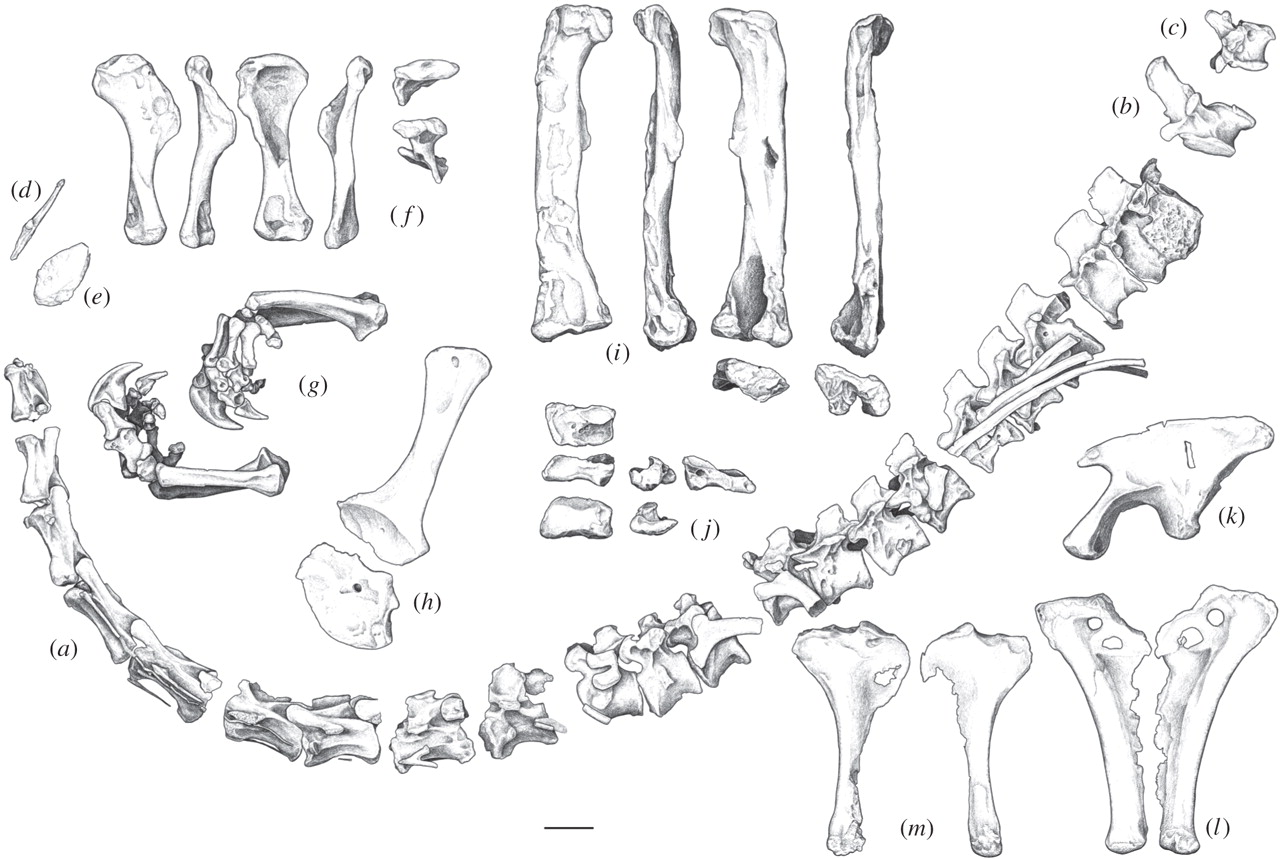
Illustration of the bones in the holotype

All specimens of Sarahsaurus were collected from the Lower Jurassic Kayenta Formation near Gold Spring, Arizona. The genus is based on a nearly complete and articulated (with bones still connected to each other) skeleton with a fragmentary and disarticulated skull (holotype, specimen number TMM 43646-2). In addition, a partial skeleton (specimen number TMM 43646-3) as well as a nearly complete skull (specimen number MCZ 8893) was assigned to the genus. The latter specimen was originally referred to as Massospondylus sp. The complete skull is crushed and split horizontally, separating the skull roof from the palate; this split was caused by periodic swelling and shrinkage of the surrounding clay after burial. While the holotype individual was mature, the second skull indicates a less mature individual as indicated by open suture lines that separate skull bones of the braincase (the bones enclosing the brain).

Sarahsaurus was first described by Timothy B. Rowe, Hans-Dieter Sues and Robert R. Reisz in 2011; the type species is Sarahsaurus aurifontanalis. The generic name honours Sarah (Mrs. Ernest) Butler, an Austin philanthropist. She helped fund the "Dino Pit" exhibit at the Austin Nature and Science Center, which Rowe helped create; he was quoted as saying "I told [Sarah] if she really raised a million dollars to build the Dino Pit, I'd name a dinosaur after her.". The specific name is derived from aurum (Latin), "gold", and fontanalis (Latin), "of the spring" in reference to Gold Spring, Arizona, where the holotype was found. Sarahsaurus is the fourth basal sauropodomorph dinosaur to have been officially identified in North America; the other three are Anchisaurus and Ammosaurus from the Early Jurassic of the Connecticut River Valley, and Seitaad of the later Navajo Sandstone of Early Jurassic Utah; a genus of basal sauropodmorph from Early Jurassic deposits around Nova Scotia called Fendusaurus remains undescribed. It is thought to have appeared through a dispersal event that originated in South America and was separate from those of the other two sauropodomorphs. The animal is notable for possessing very large, powerful hands, possibly suggesting that it was an omnivore.

== Description ==
Sarahsaurus was a basal (or "primitive") member of the sauropodomorph lineage, which also included the more derived (or "advanced") sauropods – giant four-legged herbivores (plant-eaters) with long necks and tails. Basal sauropodomorphs such as Sarahsaurus already resemble sauropods in a number of aspects, including the elongated neck and robust build, but are reminiscent of the ancestral dinosaurs in others: Sarahsaurus was bipedal (two-legged), with forelimbs that were much shorter than the hind limbs and equipped with powerful grasping hands. Sarahsaurus was mid-sized for a basal sauropodomorph, with its vertebral column measuring more than 3.1 metres (10 ft) in length. Paleontologist Gregory Paul, in a 2016 popular book, estimated its length at 4 metres (13 ft) and its body weight at 200 kilograms (440 lb).

=== Skull ===
The external naris (skull opening for the nostril) was less than half the size of the orbit (eye socket). It was bordered by the nasal, premaxilla, and, to a small extent, the maxilla, the latter two forming the upper jaw. Between the premaxilla and maxilla there was a large opening, the subnarial foramen. The antorbital fossa, an additional skull opening seen in most dinosaurs that was situated between the external naris and orbit, was less than half the length of the orbit. Much of the upper margin of the orbit was formed by the frontal bone of the skull roof; this bone, however, did not contribute to the front margin of the upper temporal fenestra at the rear end of the skull roof. Instead, this front margin was formed by the postorbital and parietal bones, with the front part of the parietal being forked to connect with the latter. Between the parietal and the supraoccipital, which follows behind the parietal at the back of the skull, was another opening, the postparietal fenestra, which was large in Sarahsaurus. A unique feature of the genus can be found on the underside of the braincase, where a shallow ridge spanned between the basipterygoid processes, bony downwards projections of the braincase that brace the latter against the palate. The lower jaw curved downwards towards its tip, and the jaw joint was located well below the level of the tooth row. There is no evidence for a beak.

Each side of the upper jaw was lined with 20 teeth – four in the premaxilla, the front bone of the upper jaw, and 16 in the maxilla which followed behind. The dentary bone of the lower jaw likewise had 20 teeth. The teeth were moderately heterodont, i.e., tooth shape varied within the jaw, and sat slightly obliquely in the jaw, slightly overlapping each other. Their cutting edges were serrated with up to 20 denticles per tooth.

=== Postcranium ===
The spine comprised 10 cervical (neck) vertebrae; 14 dorsal (trunk) vertebrae; three sacral (hip) vertebrae; and ca. 50 caudal (tail) vertebrae. In contrast to the later sauropods, the sides of the dorsal vertebrae did not show deep cavities caused by air sacs invading the bone (postcranial skeletal pneumaticity). The scapula (shoulder blade) was hourglass-shaped. In the holotype specimen, the scapula and coracoid were unfused, probably connected only via cartilage; this might indicate that the individual was not yet fully mature. The holotype specimen includes the sternum (breastbone) and the clavicle (collarbone), which are rarely found with dinosaur skeletons. The clavicula is a rod-like bone that articulates with the lower end of the scapula in an immobile joint. It has been controversial if the left and right clavicles of sauropodomorphs were attached to each other at their ends, thus connecting the left and right shoulder girdles, or if they were pressed against their scapulae along their lengths. The orientation of the clavicle in Sarahsaurus confirms that the former was the case; the ends of both clavicles would probably have been connected to each other by a ligament, though they were not fused. In side view, the scapula was tilted between 45° and 65° relative to the horizontal. This would have allowed the left and right coracoids to almost touch each other at the body midline, while the left and right sterna, which were attached to each other at the midline, would have been located directly behind the coracoids.

The humerus (upper arm bone) was more than half the length of the femur (upper thigh bone), and had a large crest on its front side for muscle attachment, the deltopectoral crest, which extended for half the length of the bone and had an S-shaped edge. In the hand, the ungual (claw bone) of the first finger was the largest.

In the hip, the ilium had two downwards-facing bony projections, the ischial and pubic peduncle, which connected to the two lower hip bones, the ischium and the pubis, respectively, as in other dinosaurs. In Sarahsaurus, the ischial peduncle was only half the length of the pubic peduncle. The acetabulum (hip joint) was formed by all three hip bones, as in other dinosaurs, though in Sarahsaurus the ischium contributed less than half as much as the pubis. The pubis was unique in having two separate openings, the obturator foramen and the pubic foramen; the latter was lacking in most other archosaurs. The femur was straight and elliptical in cross-section. The tibia (shin bone) reached 84% of the length of the femur.

== Classification ==
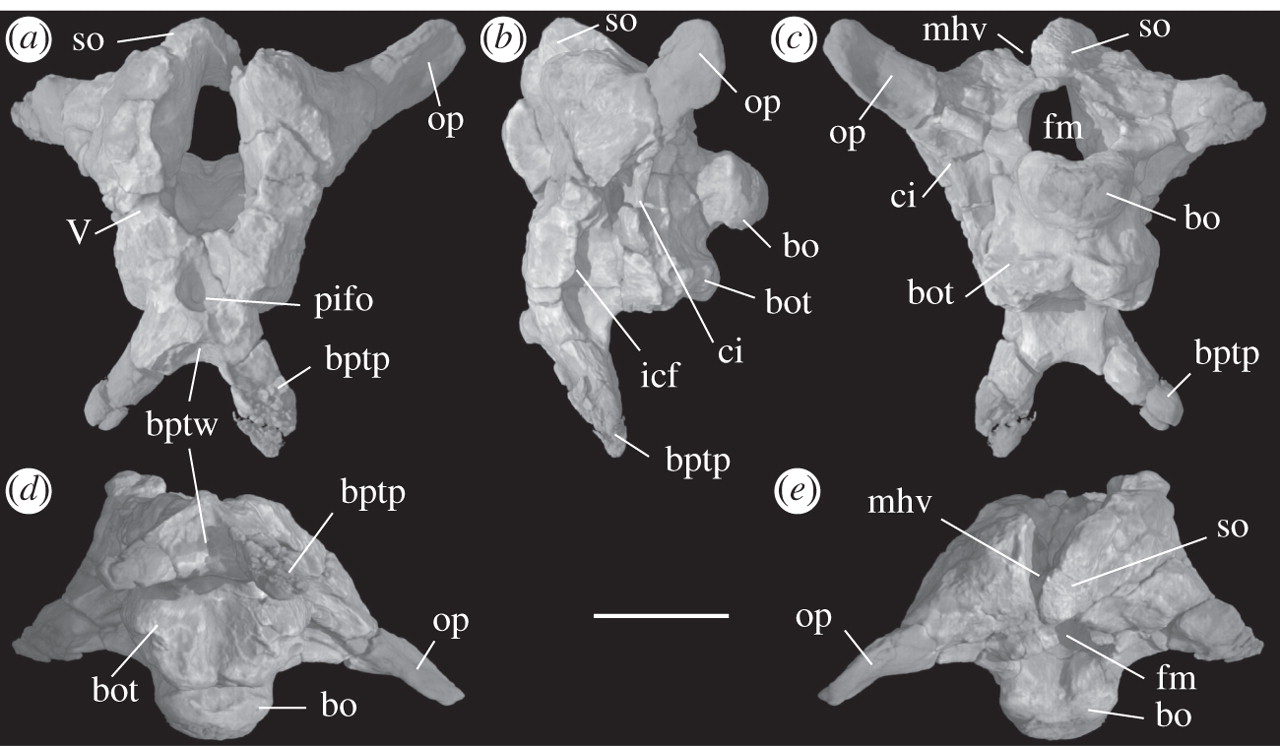
Holotype braincase in multiple views

In a cladistic analysis, presented by Apaldetti and colleagues in November 2011, Sarahsaurus was found to be most closely related to Ignavusaurus within Massopoda. Their group was found to be intermediate between plateosaurids and massospondylids, being more derived than the former and more primitive than the latter. A 2018 cladistic analysis by Chapelle and Choiniere recovered Sarahsaurus and Ignavusaurus as massospondylids, mirroring the original assignment of Sarahsaurus to Massospondylus.

- Plateosauria
  - Plateosauridae
    - Unaysaurus
    - Plateosaurus
  - - Riojasauridae
      - Riojasaurus
      - Eucnemesaurus
    - - - Sarahsaurus
        - Ignavusaurus
      - - Massospondylidae
          - - Massospondylus
            - - Leyesaurus
              - Adeopapposaurus
          - - Coloradisaurus
            - Glacialisaurus
            - Lufengosaurus
        - - Jingshanosaurus
          - - Yunnanosaurus
            - - Seitaad
              - Anchisauria

== Paleoecology ==
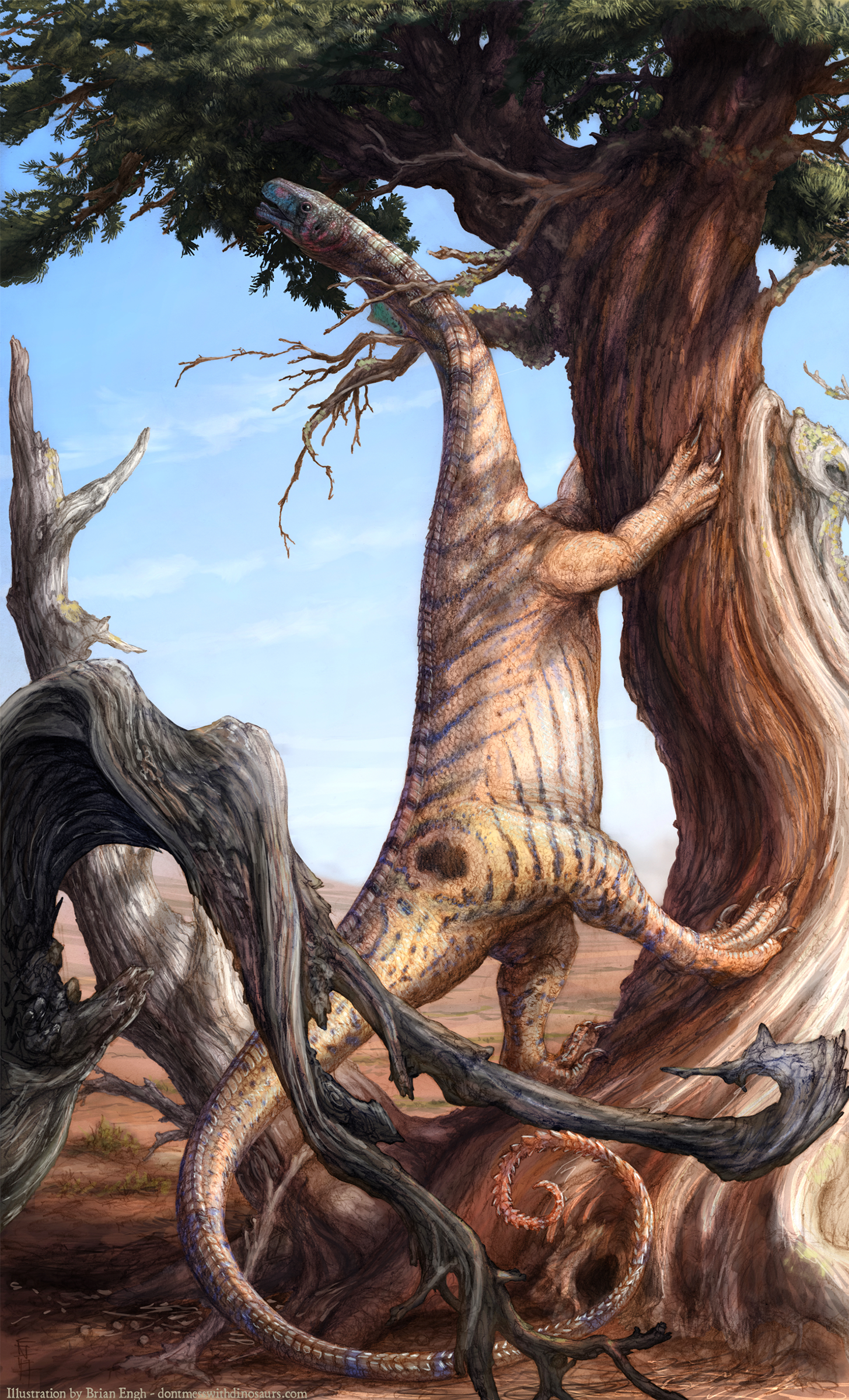
Restoration

=== Age and habitat ===
A definitive radiometric dating of the Kayenta Formation has not yet been made, and the available stratigraphic correlation has been based on a combination of radiometric dates from vertebrate fossils, magnetostratigraphy and pollen evidence. It has been surmised that the Kayenta Formation was deposited during the Sinemurian and Pliensbachian stages of the Early Jurassic period, approximately 199 to 182 million years ago. The Kayenta Formation is part of the Glen Canyon Group that includes formations not only in northern Arizona but also parts of southeastern Utah, western Colorado, and northwestern New Mexico. The formation was primarily deposited by rivers. During the Early Jurassic, the land that is now the Kayenta Formation experienced rainy summers and dry winters. By the Middle Jurassic period it was being encroached upon from the north by a sandy dune field that would become the Navajo Sandstone. The animals here were adapted to a seasonal climate and abundant water could be found in streams, ponds and lakes.

=== Paleofauna ===
Sarahsaurus shared its paleoenvironment with other dinosaurs, such as several theropods including Dilophosaurus, Kayentavenator, Coelophysis kayentakatae, and the "Shake N Bake" theropod, and the armored dinosaurs Scelidosaurus and Scutellosaurus. The Kayenta Formation has yielded a small but growing assemblage of organisms. Vertebrates present in the Kayenta Formation at the time of Sarahsaurus included hybodont sharks, indeterminate bony fish, lungfish, salamanders, the frog Prosalirus, the caecilian Eocaecilia, the turtle Kayentachelys, a sphenodontian reptile, various lizards, and the pterosaur Rhamphinion. Also present were the synapsids Dinnebitodon, Kayentatherium, Oligokyphus, morganucodontids, the possible early true mammal Dinnetherium, and a haramiyid mammal. Several early crocodylomorphs were present including Calsoyasuchus, Eopneumatosuchus, Kayentasuchus, and Protosuchus. Vertebrate trace fossils from this area included coprolites and the tracks of therapsids, lizard-like animals, and dinosaurs, which provided evidence that these animals were also present. Non-vertebrates in this ecosystem included microbial or "algal" limestone, freshwater bivalves, freshwater mussels and snails, and ostracods. The plant life known from this area included trees preserved as petrified wood.
