= Kayenta Formation =

Jurassic sandstone formation of the southwestern United States

- Stratigraphic range: Sinemurian-Toarcian; ~198.0–178.8 Ma
- Kayenta Formation, Capitol Reef National Park, Utah.
- Type: Geological formation
- Unit of: Glen Canyon Group
- Underlies: Navajo Sandstone
- Overlies: Wingate Sandstone
- Thickness: 100 to 120 metres (330 to 390 ft)

Lithology
- Primary: Sandstone
- Other: Siltstone, Limestone

Location
- Coordinates: 37.8°N 110.6°W
- Country: United States
- Extent: northern Arizona, northwest Colorado, Nevada, and Utah

Type section
- Named for: Kayenta, Arizona

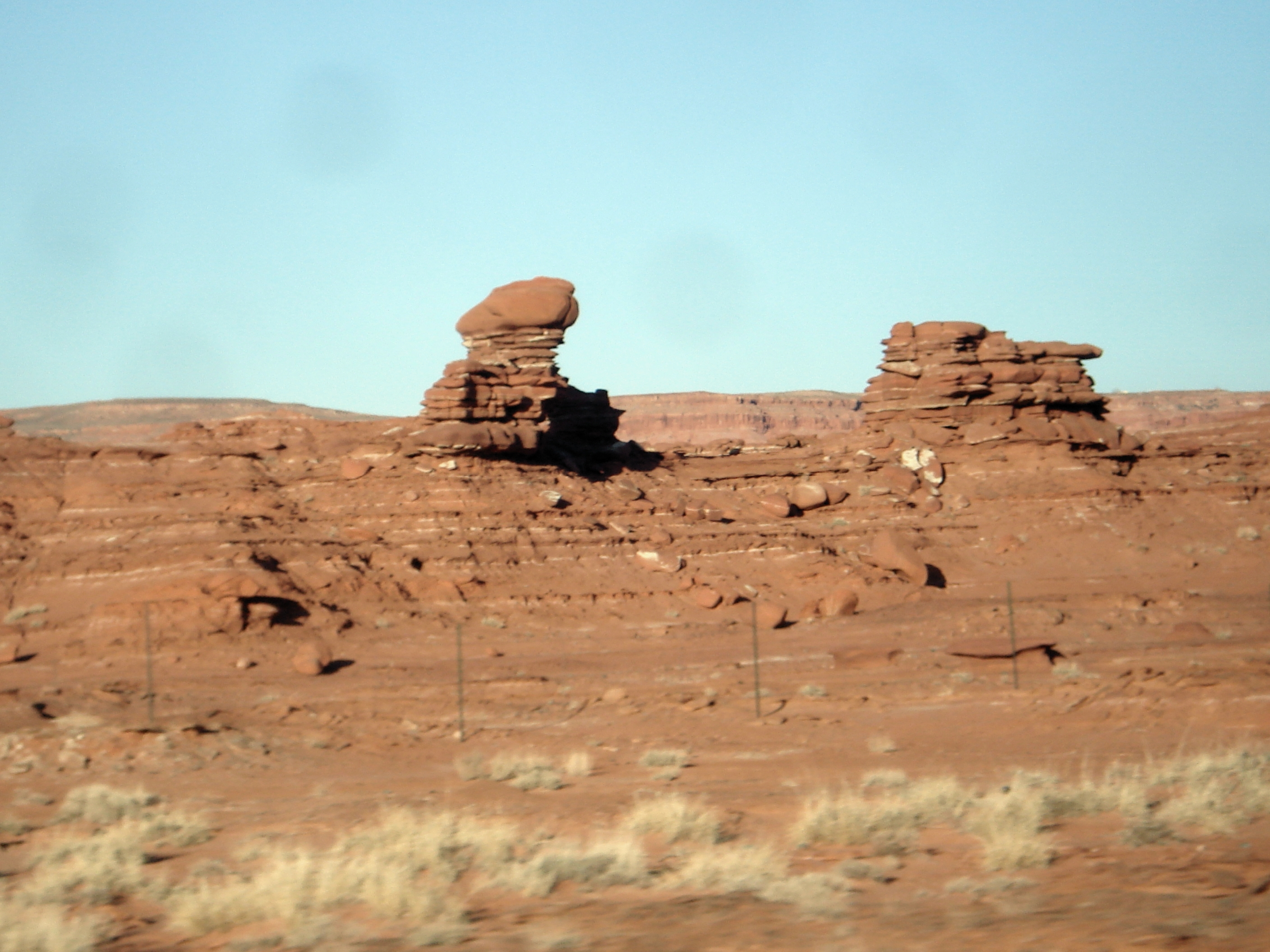
Kayenta Formation west of Tuba City, Arizona.

The Kayenta Formation is a geological formation in the Glen Canyon Group that is spread across the Colorado Plateau area of the United States, including northern Arizona, northwest Colorado, Nevada, and Utah. Originally suggested as being Sinemurian-Pliensbachian, but more recent dating of detrital zircons has yielded a depositional age of 183.7 ± 2.7 Ma, thus a Pliensbachian-Toarcian age is more likely. A previous depth work recovered a solid "Carixian" (Lower-Middle Pliensbachian) age from measurements done in the Tenney Canyon. More recent works have provided varied datations for the layers, with samples from Colorado and Arizona suggesting 197.0±1.5-195.2±5.5 Ma (Middle Sinemurian), while the topmost section is likely Toarcian or close in age, maybe even recovering terrestrial deposits coeval with the Toarcian Oceanic Anoxic Event. This last age assignation also correlated the Toarcian Vulcanism on the west Cordilleran Magmatic Arc, as the number of grains from this event correlate with the silt content in the sandstones of the upper layers.

This rock formation is particularly prominent in southeastern Utah, where it is seen in the main attractions of a number of national parks and monuments. These include Zion National Park, Capitol Reef National Park, the San Rafael Swell, and Canyonlands National Park.

The Kayenta Formation frequently appears as a thinner dark broken layer below Navajo Sandstone and above Wingate Sandstone (all three formations are in the same group). Together, these three formations can result in immense vertical cliffs of 600 metres (2,000 ft) or more. Kayenta layers are typically red to brown in color, forming broken ledges.

== Kayenta Formation in Utah ==
=== Southeast Utah ===
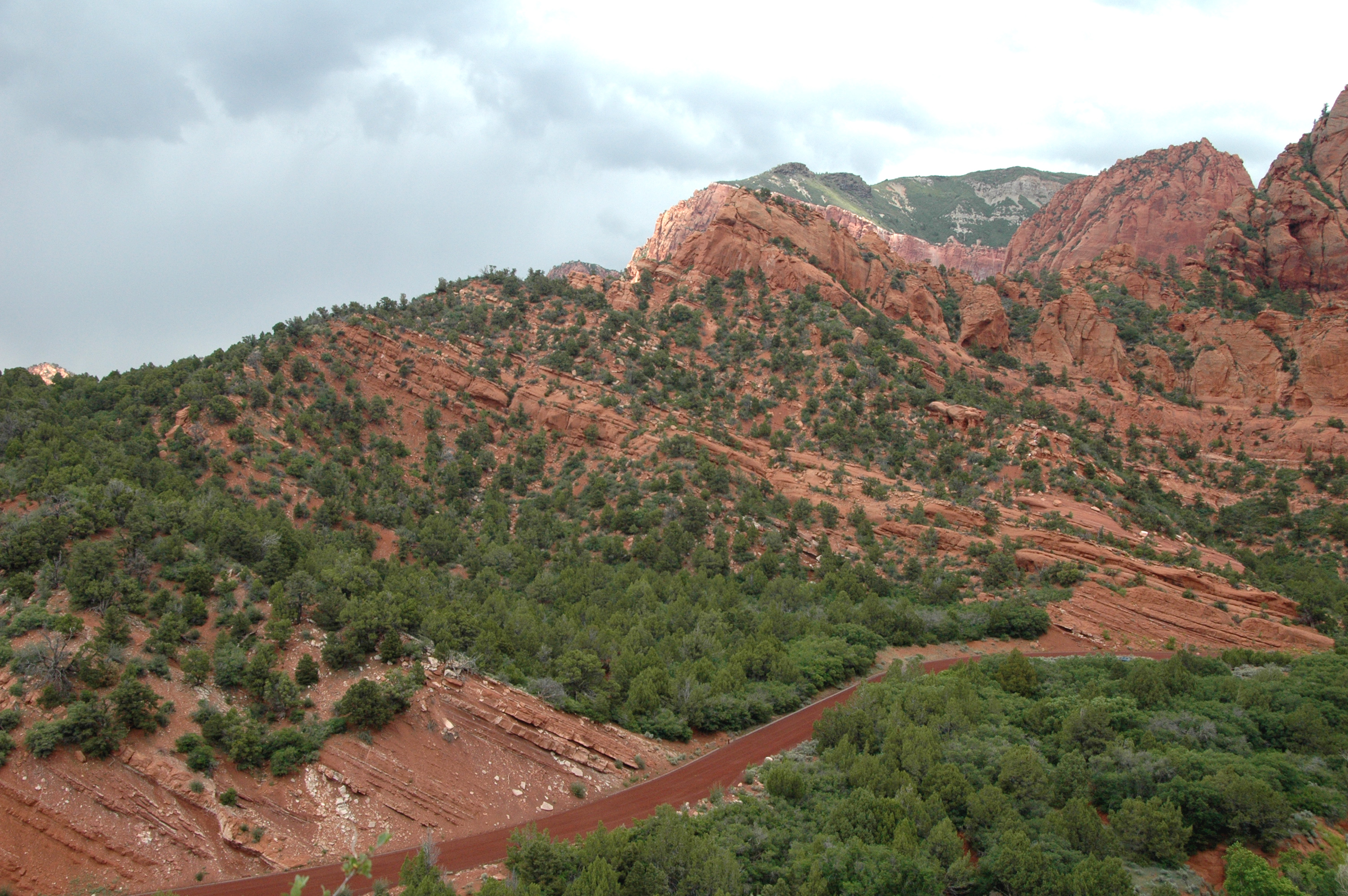
Redbeds including the Kayenta Formation and the Navajo Sandstone in Kolob Canyons, Zion National Park, Utah, USA

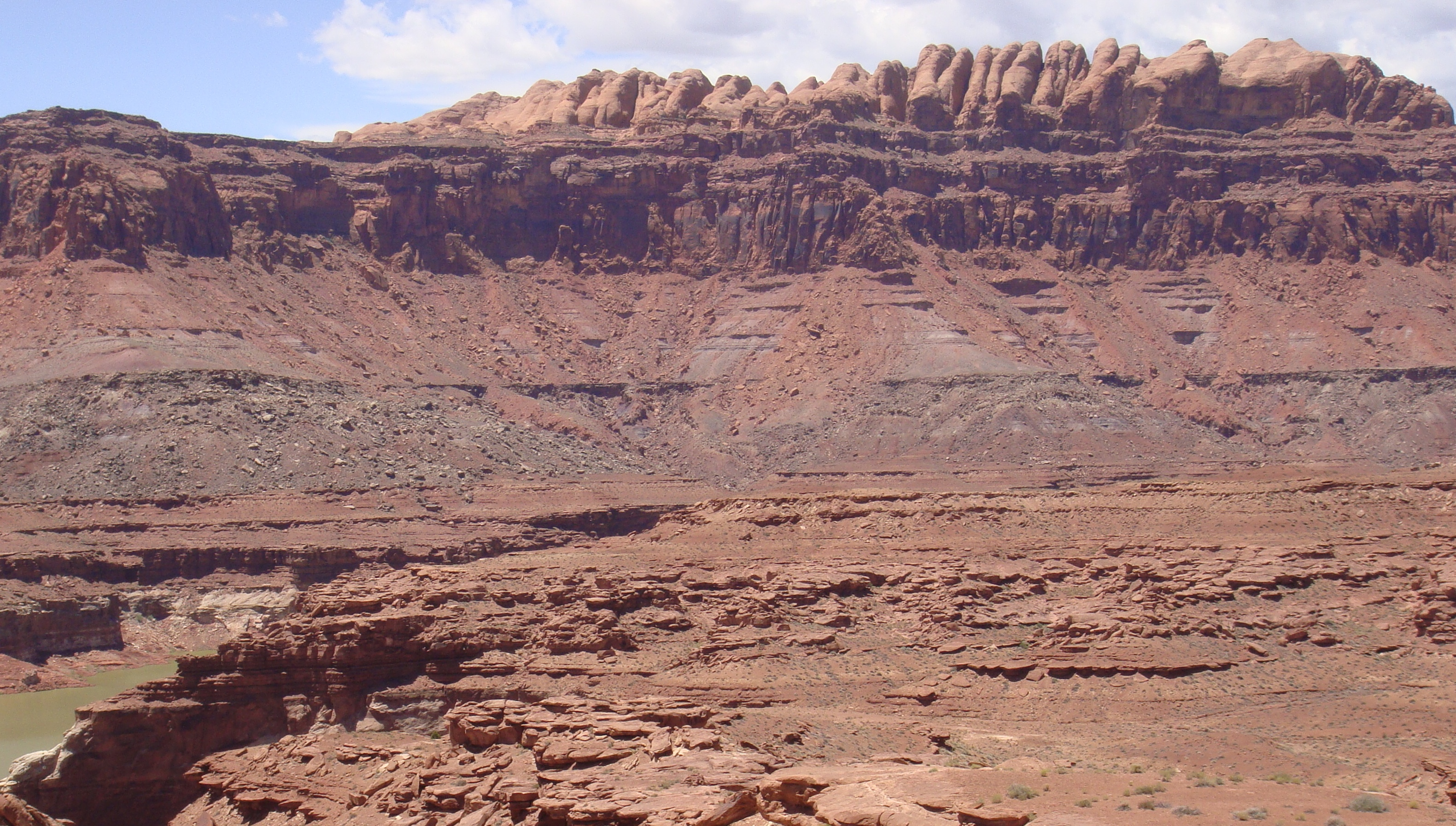
The Permian through Jurassic stratigraphy of the Colorado Plateau area of southeastern Utah that makes up much of the famous prominent rock formations in protected areas such as Capitol Reef National Park and Canyonlands National Park. From top to bottom: Rounded tan domes of the Navajo Sandstone, layered red Kayenta Formation, cliff-forming, vertically jointed, red Wingate Sandstone, slope-forming, purplish Chinle Formation, layered, lighter-red Moenkopi Formation, and white, layered Cutler Formation sandstone. Picture from Glen Canyon National Recreation Area, Utah.

In most sections that include all three geologic formations of the Glen Canyon group the Kayenta is easily recognized. Even at a distance it appears as a dark-red, maroon, or lavender band of thin-bedded material between two thick, massive, cross bedded strata of buff, tan, or light-red color. Its position is also generally marked by a topographic break. Its weak beds form a bench or platform developed by stripping the Navajo sandstone back from the face of the Wingate cliffs. The Kayenta is made up of beds of sandstone, shale, and limestone, all lenticular, uneven at their tops, and discontinuous within short distances. They suggest deposits made by shifting streams of fluctuating volume. The sandstone beds, from less than 25 millimetres (1 in) to more than 3 metres (10 ft) thick, are composed of relatively coarse, well-rounded quartz grains cemented by lime and iron. The thicker beds are indefinitely cross bedded. The shales are essentially fine-grained, very thin sandstones that include lime concretions and balls of consolidated mud. The limestone appears as solid gray-blue beds, a few inches to a few feet thick, and as lenses of limestone conglomerate. Most of the limestone lenses are less than 8 metres (25 ft) long, but two were traced for nearly 150 metres (500 ft) and one for 500 metres (1,650 ft).

Viewed as a whole, the Kayenta is readily distinguished from the geologic formations above and below it. It is unlike them in composition, color, manner of bedding, and sedimentary history. Obviously the conditions of sedimentation changed in passing from the Wingate Sandstone formation to the Kayenta and from the Kayenta to the Navajo sandstone, but the nature and regional significance of the changes have not been determined. In some measured sections the transition from Wingate to Kayenta is gradual; the material in the basal Kayenta, beds seems to have been derived from the Wingate immediately below and redeposited with only the discordance characteristic of fluviatile sediments. But in many sections the contact between the two formations is unconformable; the basal Kayenta consists of conglomerate and lenticular sandstone that fills depressions eroded in the underlying beds. In Moqui Canyon near Red Cone Spring nearly 3 metres (10 ft) of Kayenta limestone conglomerate rests in a long meandering valley cut in Wingate. Likewise, the contact between the Kayenta and the Navajo in places seems to be gradational, but generally a thin jumbled mass of sandstone and shales, chunks of shale and limestone, mud balls, and concretions of lime and iron, lies at the base of the fine-grained, cross bedded Navajo. Mud cracks, a few ripple marks, and incipient drainage channels were observed in the topmost bed of the Kayenta on Red Rock Plateau; and in west Glen Canyon, wide sand-filled cracks appear at the horizon. These features indicate that, in places at least, the Wingate and Kayenta were exposed to erosion before their overlying geologic formations were deposited, are it may be that the range in thickness of the Kayenta thus in part (is) accounted for.

=== Southwest Utah ===
The red and mauve Kayenta siltstones and sandstones that form the slopes at base of the Navajo Sandstone cliffs record the record of low to moderate energy streams. Poole (1997) has shown that the streams still flowed toward the east depositing from 150 to 210 m (500 to 700 ft) of sediment here. The sedimentary structures showing the channel and flood plain deposits of streams are well exposed on switchbacks below the tunnel in Pine Creek Canyon.

In the southeastern part of Zion National Park a stratum of cross bedded sandstone is found roughly halfway between the top and bottom of the Kayenta Formation. It is a "tongue" of sandstone that merges with the Navajo formation east of Kanab, and it shows that desert conditions occurred briefly in this area during Kayenta time. This tongue is the ledge that shades the lower portion of the Emerald Pool Trail, and it is properly called Navajo, not Kayenta.

Fossil mudcracks attest to occasional seasonal climate, and thin limestones and fossilized trails of aquatic snails or worms mark the existence of ponds and lakes. The most interesting fossils, however, are the dinosaur tracks that are relatively common in Kayenta mudstone.

These vary in size, but all seem to be the tracks of three-toed reptiles that walked upright, leaving their tracks in the muds on the flood plains. Unfortunately, so far no bone materials have been found in Washington County that would enable more specific identification.

Apparently, during Kayenta time Zion was situated in a climatic belt like that of Senegal with rainy summers and dry winters at the southern edge of a great desert. The influence of the desert was about to predominate, however, as North America drifted northward into the arid desert belt.

== Glen Canyon ==
The Kayenta Formation is approximately 120 metres (400 ft) thick and consists of a fine-grained sandstone interbedded with layers of siltstone. The alternation of these units generally produces a series of ledges and slopes between the cliffs of the Navajo and Moenave formation. Dinosaur tracks are fairly common in the siltstone, and fresh water mussels and snails occur but are rare. The Kayenta Formation is colored pale red and adds to the splendor of the Vermilion Cliffs. It accumulated as deposits of rivers.

== Fossils ==
Color key: Taxon / Reclassified taxon / Taxon falsely reported as present / Dubious taxon or junior synonym / Ichnotaxon / Ootaxon / Morphotaxon

Notes
Uncertain or tentative taxa are in small text
~~crossed out~~ taxa are discredited.

=== Invertebrates ===
Genus	Species	Location	Stratigraphic position	Material	Notes	Images
Darwinula	D. magna; D.sarytirmensis	Gold Spring Quarry 1	Base of the "typical facies"	Valves	A freshwater (lacustrine or fluvial) ostracod, type member of the family Darwinulidae. Kayenta specimens have a distinctive columnar calcitic layer. The Kayenta fauna is similar to the Sinemurian faunas of the Toutunhe Formation of Xinjiang, China.	
Liratina	L. sp.	Gold Spring Quarry 1	Base of the "typical facies"	Single shell	A freshwater (lacustrine or fluvial) snail, incertae sedis inside Mesogastropoda. Differs considerably from the species from the Upper Jurassic Morrison Formation, Liratina jurassicum	
Lymnaea	L. hopii	Colorado Plateau	Base of the "typical facies"	Shells	A freshwater (lacustrine or fluvial) snail, member of the family Lymnaeidae.	
Scabriculocypris	S. n. sp	Gold Spring Quarry 1	Base of the "typical facies"	Valves	A freshwater (lacustrine or fluvial) ostracod, incertae sedis inside Cypridacea. Differs from all other described species of the genus in being more elongate and from most in being spinose.	
Unio	U. dumblei; U. dockumensis; U. iridoides	South of Moab	Base of the "typical facies"	Shells	A freshwater (lacustrine or fluvial) Bivalve, member of the family Unionidae.	
Valvata	V. gregorii	Colorado Plateau	Base of the "typical facies"	Shells	A freshwater (lacustrine or fluvial) snail, member of the family Valvatidae.	

=== Fishes ===
The "Kayenta Fish Fauna" is the last one recovered from the Glen Canyon Group sequence and it is delimited mostly to the silty facies of the Lower-Middle Part of the formation. This Fauna is rather scarce and delimited to several concrete locations with proper lacustrine or fluvial deposition, and are also scarce due to preservation bias. Another aspect that can explain the lack of fish fossils found is the use of different research techniques than used on the Chinle Formation.

==== Chondrichthyes ====
Taxon	Species	Location	Stratigraphic position	Material	Notes	Images
Hybodontoidea	Indeterminate	Shonto Trading Post, Segi Canyon; Ward Terrace	Base of the "typical facies"	UCMP 136104, 136105 + ten uncatalogued specimens, teeth	A freshwater (lacustrine or fluvial) non-neoselachian shark, incertae sedis inside Hybodontoidea. The remains of sharks are rather rare on the formation and limited to several locations with typical lacustrine or fluvial floodplain deposition.	
Toarcibatidae (= "Archaeobatidae")	Indeterminate	Gold Spring Quarry 1	Base of the "typical facies"	Isolated Tooth	A freshwater (lacustrine or fluvial) toarcibatid. Related originally with Micropristis or Libanopristis, and stated to be reworked from younger Cretaceous deposits, was found due to its asymmetrical cusp to fit within the definition of Toarcibatis, being more likely to be native of the formation.	

==== Actinopterygii ====
Taxon	Species	Location	Stratigraphic position	Material	Notes	Images
Lophionotus	L. kanabensis	Washington Dome; Ward Terrace; Warner Valley; Zion National Park	Base of the "typical facies"	Fragmentary Specimens, Isolated Teeth and Scales	A freshwater (lacustrine or fluvial) semionotid semionotiform.	
"Palaeoniscidae"	Indeterminate	Utah Route 7 near St.George; Warner Valley	Base of the "typical facies"	Isolated Ganoid Scales& Teeth	A freshwater (lacustrine or fluvial) palaeoniscid palaeonisciform.	
Semionotidae	Indeterminate	Utah Route 7 near St.George; Downtown Moab; Warner Valley; Washington Dome; Ward Terrace; Warner Valley; Zion National Park; Desert Tortoise tracksite 1	Base of the "typical facies"	Large (1 m) Complete specimen; Isolated Ganoid Scales & Teeth	A freshwater (lacustrine or fluvial) semionotid semionotiform, probably related to the genus Semionotus. Semionotiformes are the only properly identified bony fishes from the formation, including a large specimen exposed at the Dan O'Laurie Museum.	Semionotus is probably related to the Kayenta Seminotiformes

==== Sarcopterygii ====
Genus / Taxon	Species	Location	Stratigraphic position	Material	Notes	Images
Ceratodus	C. stewarti	Goblin Valley State Park	Middle "Silty Facies"	OMNH 69332, left pterygopalatine plate	A freshwater (lacustrine or fluvial) ceratodontid dipnomorph (lungfish).	Ceratodus
Coelacanthidae	Indeterminate	Tsegi Canyon; Warner Valley	Base of the "typical facies"	Isolated remains & Scales	A freshwater (lacustrine or fluvial) coelacanthid Coelacanthiform. Coelacanths are quoted from this zone, but their remains have not been studied.	
Potamoceratodus	P. guentheri	Tsegi Canyon?; Little Colorado River Valley on Ward Terrace	Middle "Silty Facies"	Single dipnoan tooth plate (MCZ 13865)	A freshwater (lacustrine or fluvial) ceratodontid dipnomorph (lungfish). Was described as C. felchi, know from the Upper Jurassic Morrison Formation. Other dipnoan specimens have been cited but never described.	

=== Amphibia ===
Genus / Taxon	Species	Location	Stratigraphic position	Material	Notes	Images
Anura	Indeterminate	Gold Spring Quarry 1	Silty Facies Member	MCZ 9019, distal humerus; MCZ 9020–24, ilia	An early frog, incertae sedis relationships	
Eocaecilia	E. micropodia	Gold Spring Quarry 1	Silty Facies Member	MNA V8066 (type), Nearly complete skull and lower jaw; Isolated multiple specimens, cranial and postcranial: MNA V8053, 8054, 8055...	A genus whose relationships are controversial, being considered one of the earliest gymnophionans as a close relative of caecilians	Eocaecilia
Lissamphibia	Indeterminate	Gold Spring Quarry 1	Silty Facies Member	MCZ 9025–9028, jaws; MCZ 9031, 9032, vertebrae; MCZ 9035, atlas vertebra; MCZ 9034 + 4 uncatalogued specimens, proximal femora; MCZ 9066, 9067, proximal humeri; MCZ 9068–9072, proximal limb bones, possibly humeri	Incertae sedis relationships	
Prosalirus	P. bitis	Gold Spring Quarry 1	Silty Facies Member	MNA V 8725, associated disarticulated remains of 2 individuals; referred MCZ 9324 A & MCZ 9323 A	An early frog, probably related to Notobatrachidae	Prosalirus
Urodela	Indeterminate	Gold Spring Quarry 1	Silty Facies Member	MCZ 9017, 9018, atlas vertebrae	A possible stem-salamander, incertae sedis inside Urodela. The oldest record of an urodelan from North America	

=== Reptilia ===
==== Rhynchocephalia ====
Taxon	Species	Location	Stratigraphic position	Material	Notes	Images
Navajosphenodon	N. sani	Gold Springs Quarry; Silty Facies Main Quarry; Adeii Eechii Cliffs	Silty Facies	MNA.V.12442, a fully articulated skeleton, including the skull, mandibles, axial and appendicular skeleton; Referred multiple specimens MCZ VP 9098, MCZ VP 101562, MCZ VP 9099, MCZ VP 101564, MCZ VP 101575, MCZ VP 9094, MCZ VP 9102, MCZ VP 9103, MCZ VP 101569, MCZ VP 101563, MNA.V.8726, MNA.V.8727	An Advanced Sphenodont, member of Sphenodontinae. The skeleton of N. sani shows a large number of similarities with the modern tuatara S. punctatus, clustering them closely together in the morphospace of sphenodontians and early lepidosaurs.	Navajosphenodon
Rhynchocephalia	Indeterminate	Airhead West	Silty Facies	Uncertain Fragments	Rhynchocephalians of uncertain assignment	
Sphenodontia	Indeterminate	Gold Spring Quarry 1	Silty Facies	MCZ 9036 through 9040, jaw fragments	An indeterminate sphenodont	

==== Testudinatans ====
Genus / taxon	Species	Location	Stratigraphic position	Material	Notes	Images
Cryptodira	Indeterminate	Red Knob	Silty Facies	Uncertain fragments	Cryptodirans of uncertain assignment	
Kayentachelys	K. aprix; K. spp.	Gold Spring Quarry 1; Gold Spring South; Gold Spring General; Gold Spring Wash; Hummingbird Canyon; Ted's Turtle Town; Gerald's Turtle	Silty Facies Member	MNA V1558, complete skull only lacking the right temporal arch and mandible; Referred multiple cranial and postcranial material: MNAV2664, TMM 436701–3, TMM 43656-1...	A mesochelydian	Kayentachelys
Testudinata	Indeterminate	Airhead West; Gold Spring General; Moenkopi Point; Valley of the Buttes; Paiute Canyon General; East Paiute Valley	Silty Facies	Uncertain fragments	Testudinatans of uncertain assignment	

==== Crocodylomorphs ====
Genus / Taxon	Species	Location	Stratigraphic position	Material	Notes	Images
Calsoyasuchus	C. valliceps	Adeii Eechii Cliffs, Navajo Nation	Silty Facies	TMM 43631-1 (holotype), partial skull	A terrestrial member of the Hsisosuchidae. Alternatively can be a relative of Thalattosuchia	
Crocodylomorpha	"Undescribed new genus"; Indeterminate	Utah Route 7 near St.George; Airhead West; Moenkopi Point, Pumpkin Patch; Blue layer, Silty Facies; Gold Spring Quarry 1	Silty Facies	Teeth (+30); UCMP 97639, 97640; MCZ 9044, dermal armor fragment; MCZ 9199, fragment of pseudosuchian dermal scute; MCZ 9200, dermal scute, probably Eopneumatosuchus; UCMP 136102, fragment of lower jaw	Indeterminate crocodylomorphs. Includes a new taxon with skull similar to Orthosuchus stormbergi.	
Eopneumatosuchus	E. colberti	Blue layer, Silty Facies	Silty Facies	MNA P1.2460, partial skull; Isolated Jaw	An early terrestrial or semiterrestrial protosuchid crocodylomorph	
Kayentasuchus	K. walkeri	Warner Valley; Willow Springs 13	Silty Facies	UCMP 131830, nearly complete skeleton; UMNH VP 21923	An early terrestrial or semiterrestrial crocodylomorph	Kayentasuchus, preserved bones in white
Protosuchidae	"Gomphosuchus wellesi"; "Edentosuchus-like taxon"	Moenkopi Point, Pumpkin Patch; Blue layer, Silty Facies	Silty Facies	MCZ 8816, mandible; UCMP 97638, A skull and articulated mandible; UCMP 125395: A cranium.; UCMP 125871: Skull with mandibles and one epibranchial lacking the dorsal part of the braincase, articulated with the atlas, axis, and 2 cervical vertebrae.; UCMP 125358; UCMP 125359: An eroded compressed braincase.; UCMP 125872: A right jugal and maxilla in articulation in a large block of unprepared material.; UCMP 125870: A very well-preserved braincase; UCMP 130082	Early terrestrial or semi-terrestrial herbivorous Crocodylomorphs. Includes two taxa similar to the Cretaceous Edentosuchus tienshanensis, one that has been referred to informally as "Gomphosuchus" (including UCMP 97638 and UCMP 125871) and another unnamed taxon (including UCMP 130082). Previously considered one taxon (the 'Kayenta form') in older literature.	

==== Dinosaurs ====
Indeterminate ornithischian remains located in Arizona, USA. Ornithischian tracks located in Arizona, USA. Indeterminate theropod remains located in Arizona, US. Theropod tracks located in Arizona and Utah, US. Possible theropod tracks located in Arizona, Colorado, and Utah, US.

===== Ornithischians =====
Genus / Taxon	Species	Location	Stratigraphic position	Material	Notes	Images
Heterodontosauridae	Indeterminate	Gold Springs	Silty Facies	MCZ 9092, complete upper and lower dentitions, many other portions of the skull, vertebrae from all portions of the axial column, and portions of fore and hind girdles and limbs	A heterodontosaurid of uncertain placement. Appears to have been an insectivore downsized to a degree not seen before among early dinosaurs.	
Ornithischia	Laquintasaura-like; Indeterminate	Utah Route 7 near St.George; Gold Spring Quarry	Silty Facies	MNA.V.109, a large left femur; Isolated Teeth (+20)	A uncertain placement large ornithischian and teeth from diverse type of genera. The femur was assigned to Dilophosaurus wetherilli. The femur resembles that of the early neornithischian Lesothosaurus.	
Scelidosaurus	S. sp. (S. "arizonensis")	Valley of the Buttes	Silty Facies	UCMP 130056, scutes	A controversial thyreophoran, resembles the osteoderms of S. harrisonii.	
Scutellosaurus	S. lawleri	Paiute North; West Moenkopi Plateau; Paiute Canyon General; East Paiute Valley; Southwest Paiute Canyon; Rock Head; Willow Spring General; Gold Spring General; Gold Spring Quarry; Gold Spring South; Gerald's Turtle; Ted's Turtle Town; Hummingbird Canyon	Silty Facies	MNA P1.175, almost complete skeleton (holotype); MNA P1.1752, partial skeleton (paratype); Referred multiple specimens: TMM 43669-5/6, TMM 43661-1, TMM 43691-18, TMM 43691-20, TMM 43648-13, TMM 43663-1, TMM 43664-1, 2, TMM 47001-1, TMM 43690-6, TMM 43687-13, 117, 123...	A basal thyreophoran, the most abundant dinosaur of the formation	Scutellosaurus

===== Sauropodomorphs =====
Genus / Taxon	Species	Location	Stratigraphic position	Material	Notes	Images
Sarahsaurus	S. aurifontanalis	Gold Springs; Rock Head	Silty Facies	TMM 43646–2 partially articulated skeleton; TMM 43646–3, partial skeleton; MCZ 8893, articulated skull with fragmentary postcranial elements	A sauropodomorph, a member of the family Massospondylidae. Originally thought to be Massospondylus	Sarahsaurus

===== Theropods =====
Genus / Taxon	Species	Location	Stratigraphic position	Material	Notes	Images
Coelophysidae	Unnamed, informally known as the "Shake-N-Bake" coelophysid	Rock Head (Bowl Area); Shake-N-Bake	Silty Facies	MCZ 8817 dorsal, cervical, caudal vertebra, partial sacrum, partial pelvis, partial tooth, partial caudal centrum, proximal femur, distal tibiotarsus, distal fibula, partial astragalus, partial scapulocoracoid; MCZ 9442; sacrum, partial ilia, proximal pubes, proximal ischia; MCZ 9463; distal tibiotarsus; TMM 43689-4; proximal tarsometatarsus; MNA V3181; pubis	A coelophysid neotheropod.	
Coelophysis	C. kayentakatae	Rock Head (Bowl Area); Gold Spring Wash; Shake-N-Bake	Silty Facies	MNI; MNA V2623; TMM 43669-3; MNA V100, V140	A coelophysid neotheropod. Referred to as Syntarsus by Weishampel et al. Formerly known as Megapnosaurus.	Coelophysis kayentakatae
Dilophosaurus	D. wetherilli	Tuba City, Silty Facies; Dilophosaurus Quarry; Gold Spring East; Gold Spring General; Rock Head (Bowl Area); Moenkopi Point, Pumpkin Patch	Silty Facies	UCMP 37302 (holotype), nearly complete skeleton; UCMP 37303, partial skeleton; third skeleton eroded and not collected; MNA V3145, distal end of R femur; Referred TMM 43687-52; UCMP 77270; UCMP 130053; TMM 43646-0, 1; TMM 47006-1	An advanced neotheropod, type member of the family Dilophosauridae. Dilophosaurus is the main identified dinosaur from the formation, being both the most known and studied. It was among the largest theropods present locally, and very likely an active hunter, rather than a fisher.	Dilophosaurus
Kayentavenator	K. elysiae	Willow Springs	Silty Facies	UCMP V128659, six proximal caudal centra, three centra, two partial neural arches, fragmentary ilium, proximal pubes, pubic shaft fragments, incomplete femora, proximal tibiae, proximal fibula, fragments	A neotheropod of uncertain relationships, probably a coelophysoid. Originally referred to M. kayentakatae by Rowe.	Kayentavenator
Theropoda	Indeterminate	ARCH 71v, near the Garden of Eden; Utah Route 7 near St.George; Airhead West; Gold Spring General; Gold Spring Wash	Silty Facies	ARCH 4012, fragmentary skeletal; Isolated Teeth (+50); TMM 43669-10; TMM 43687-10, 58, 60, 71, 85, 91, 98, 102, 105, 119	Incertae sedis within Theropoda, probably Neotheropoda	

==== Pterosauria ====
Genus / Taxon	Species	Location	Stratigraphic position	Material	Notes	Images
Pterosauria	Indeterminate	Utah Route 7 near St.George	Silty Facies	Teeth	Possible pterosaur teeth	
Rhamphinion	R. jenkinsi	Airhead West; MCZ 23/78A, Foxtrot Mesa	Silty Facies, Ward Mesa	MNA V 4500 (holotype), skull fragments; UCMP 128227, left fourth wing metacarpal	A pterosaur, considered a member of the family Dimorphodontidae. Was originally classified as a "rhamphorhynchoid", represents the only major pterosaur identified from the formation and one of the oldest from North America.	

=== Synapsida ===
Genus / Taxon	Species	Location	Stratigraphic position	Material	Notes	Images
Dinnebitodon	D. amarali; D. spp.	Dinnebito Wash; Hummingbird Canyon; Gold Spring General	Silty Facies	MNA V3222 (Type, partial skull and associated postcrania); Referred MNA V3223, partial skull and scapula; MCZ 8831 includes two left dentaries; MCZ 8830, Crushed snout; TMM 43647-3, 4, TMM 43687-7	A relatively large and common tritylodont	
Dinnetherium	D. nezorum	Gold Spring Quarry 1	Silty Facies	MNA V3221; MCZ 20870-20877	A mammaliaform, member of the family Megazostrodontidae	
Haramiyidae	Indeterminate	Gold Spring Quarry 1	Silty Facies	MCZ 20879	Incertae sedis, a possible haramiyid	
Kayentatherium	K. wellesi; K. spp.	MCZ, The Landmark; Hummingbird Canyon; Gold Spring General; Gold Spring wash; Willow Spring General; Rock Head, general area	Silty Facies	MCZ 8812, well-preserved partial skeleton of a large individual; Referred TMM 43669-9; MCZ 8842; TMM 43647-9, 10; TMM 43687-111	A Large tritylodont, with a suggested semiaquatic mode of life. A specimen has been recovered with several associated perinates.	Kayentatherium
Morganucodon	M. sp.	Gold Spring Quarry 1	Silty Facies	MCZ 20878	A mammaliaform, member of the family Morganucodontidae	Morganucodon
Oligokyphus	O. sp.; cf. O. sp.	Gold Spring General; Gold Spring Quarry 1	Silty Facies	TMM 43687-86; Referred > 42 specimens	A tritylodont, also present on coeval deposits from Asia and Europe.	Oligokyphus
Tritylodontidae	Indeterminate	Airhead West; MCZ, The Landmark; Rock Head, general area; Willow springs; Gold Spring General; Gold Spring 1	Silty Facies	Teeth	Indeterminate tritylodontid remains	

=== Ichnofossils ===
Genus	Species	Location	Material	Type	Origin	Notes	Images
Anomoepus	A. scambus; A. shingi; A. moabensis; A. isp.	Moenkopi Wash; Lisbon Valley Oilfield tracksite; Hamblin tracksite; Warner Valley tracksite; Utah Route 7 near St.George; Poison Spider Mesa tracksite	Footprints	Moving Tracks	Ornithischians	Ornithischian Footprints of the ichnofamily Moyenisauropodidae.	
Batrachopus	B. isp.	Desert Tortoise tracksite	Tracks	Moving Tracks	Crocodylomorphs	Pseudosuchia Footprints of the ichnofamily Batrachopodidae.	
Characichnos	C. isp.	Utah Route 7 near St.George	Tracks	Moving Trails	Dinosaurs	Dinosaur Traces left while swimming	
Dilophosauripus	D. williamsi; D. isp.	Moenkopi Wash 4 tracksite; Moenave Road Tracksite; Goldtooth Spring tracksite; Cameron tracksite	Footprints	Moving Tracks	Theropods (Dilophosaurus?)	Theropod Footprints of the ichnofamily Grallatoridae.	Dinosaur track in the Kayenta formation at the Moenave Road site.
Dinosauropedida	Indeterminate	North Creek tracksite; Parunuweap-West Temple tracksite; Tenmile Canyon tracksite	Footprints	Moving Tracks	Dinosaurs	Possible Dinosaur Footprints, non assigned to any concrete ichnogenus	Example of Indeterminate Dinosaur Footprint from the Kayenta Formation
Eubrontes	E. giganteus; E. isp.	Washington City Water Tank tracksite 1; Flat Iron Mesa tracksite; Trout Water Canyon tracksite; Grapevine Pass Wash Tracksite; Warner Valley tracksite; Desert Tortoise tracksite; Flag Point I tracksite; Rainbow Bridge tracksite; Explorer's Canyon tracksite; Mike's Mesa tracksite (Kayenta); Utah Route 7 near St.George; Cactus Park track site	Footprints	Moving Tracks	Theropods (Dilophosaurus?)	Theropod Footprints of the ichnofamily Grallatoridae. This type of tracks match with Dilophosaurus pes	
Grallator	G. tenuis; G. isp.	Lisbon Valley Oilfield tracksite; Washington City Water Tank tracksite 1; Exit 13 North tracksite; Exit 13 South tracksite; Desert Tortoise site; Warner Valley tracksite; Desert Tortoise tracksite; Flag Point II tracksite; Utah Route 7 near St.George; Flat Iron Mesa tracksite; Cactus Park track site	Footprints	Moving Tracks	Theropods (Coelophysoids?)	Theropod Footprints of the ichnofamily Grallatoridae. Likely from smaller local theropods	
Kayentapus	K. hopii; K. soltykovensis; K. isp.	Moenkopi Wash; Trout Water Canyon tracksite; Desert Tortoise tracksite; Flag Point I tracksite; Flag Point II tracksite; Flat Iron Mesa tracksite	Footprints	Moving Tracks	Theropods	Theropod Footprints of the ichnofamily Grallatoridae.	
Limulidae	Indeterminate	Lisbon Valley Oilfield tracksite	Trackways	Moving Tracks	Limuloids; Insects?	Saltwater/Blackish-linked tracks with resemblance with extant Xiphosuran traces	
Moyenisauropus	M. isp.	Utah Route 7 near St.George	Footprints	Moving Tracks	Thyreophorans	Ornithischian Footprints of the ichnofamily Moyenisauropodidae.	
Otozoum	O. isp.	Flat Iron Mesa tracksite; Poison Spider Mesa tracksite	Footprints	Moving Tracks	Sauropodomorphs	Theropod Footprints of the ichnofamily Otozoidae. Includes tracks referable to bipedal Sauropodomorphs	
Planolites	P. isp.	Near St. George, Washington County	Cylindrical burrows	Pascichnia	Annelids	Burrow-like ichnofossils. It is referred to vermiform deposit-feeders. It is controversial, since is considered a strictly a junior synonym of Palaeophycus.	Example of Planolites fossil
Skolithos	S. isp.	Near St. George, Washington County	Cylindrical to subcylindrical Burrows	Domichnia	Annelids; Crustaceans; Fishes	Burrow-like ichnofossils. Ichnofossils done by organisms advancing along the bottom surface. Very narrow, vertical or subvertical, slightly winding unlined shafts filled with mud. Interpreted as dwelling structures of vermiform animals, more concretely the Domichnion of a suspension-feeding Worm or Phoronidan, with certain Skolithos representing entrance shafts to more complicated burrows.	Skolithos ichnofosil reconstruction, with possible fauna associated
Synapsidipedia	Indeterminate	Lisbon Valley Oilfield tracksite	Tracks	Moving Tracks	Mammaliformes; Tritylodonts	Possible Synapsid Footprints, non assigned to any concrete ichnogenus	
Taenidium	T. isp	Near St. George, Washington County	Unlined meniscate burrows	Fodinichnia	Deposit-feeding Sipuncula; Annelids	Saltwater/Blackish burrow-like ichnofossils. Taenidium is a meniscate backfill structure, usually considered to be produced by an animal progressing axially through the sediment and depositing alternating packets of differently constituted sediment behind it as it moves forward.	
Theropodipedia	Indeterminate	Lisbon Valley Oilfield tracksite; Hamblin tracksite; South Gate tracksite; Long Canyon tracksite; Washington City Water Tank tracksite 2; Lion's Back tracksite	Footprints	Moving Tracks	Theropods	Possible Theropod Footprints, non assigned to any concrete ichnogenus	Example of Indeterminate Theropod Footprint from the Kayenta Formation
Undichna	U. isp.	Utah Route 7 near St.George	Trails	Moving Trails	Bony Fishes	Fish-swimming fossil trail left as a fossil impression on a substrate	

=== Plants ===
Genus	Species	Stratigraphic position	Material	Notes	Images
Clathropteris	C. sp.	Utah Route 7 near St.George	Leaflets	Affinities with Dipteridaceae inside Polypodiales.	Example of Clathropteris meniscioides specimen
Cycadidae	Indeterminate	Utah Route 7 near St.George	Leaflets	Affinities with Cycadidae inside Cycadopsida.	Example of extant cycad, Encephalartos longifolius
Otozamites	O. sp.	Utah Route 7 near St.George	Leaflets	Affinities with Williamsoniaceae inside Bennettitales.	
Pinopsida	Indeterminate	Utah Route 7 near St.George	Leave Compressions; Isolated Cones	Affinities with Pinopsida inside Pinaceae.	
Zamites	Z. powellii	Utah Route 7 near St.George	Leaflets	A member of Williamsoniaceae inside Bennettitales. It has been interpreted as a cycad in the family Cycadaceae or a Bennettitalean plant, and also a late surviving member of Noeggerathiales.	Example of Zamites mandelslohi specimen

== See also ==
- Kayenta, Arizona
- List of dinosaur-bearing rock formations
- List of fossil sites (with link directory)
