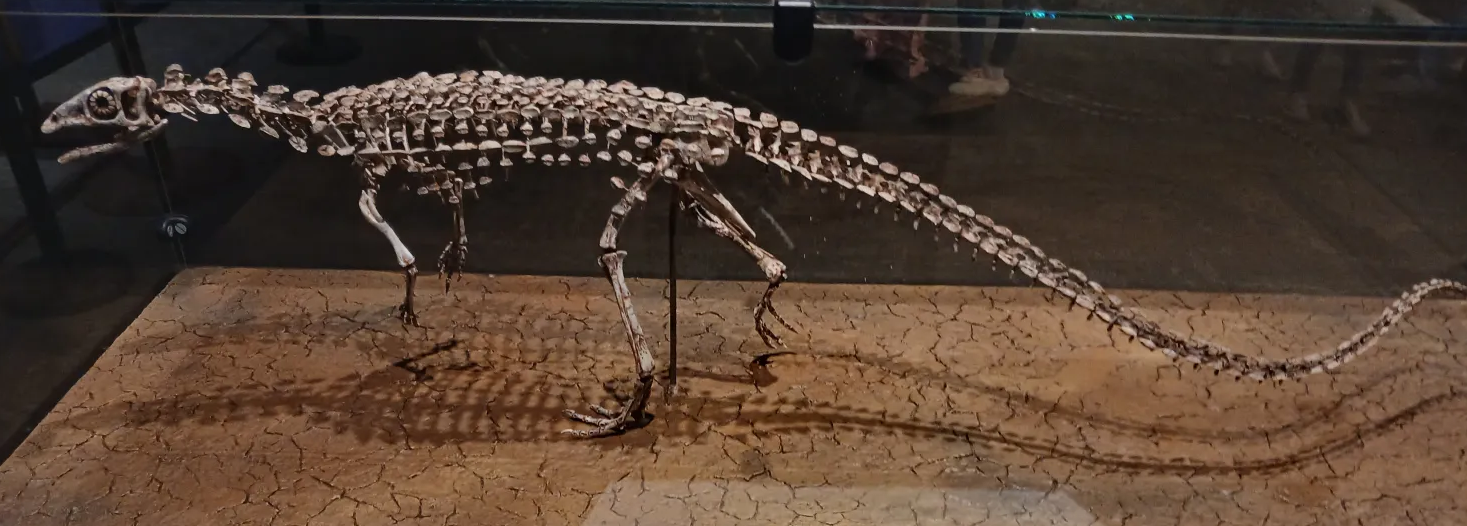
- Reconstructed skeleton at the Fernbank Museum in Georgia

Scientific classification
- Kingdom: Animalia
- Phylum: Chordata
- Class: Reptilia
- Clade: Dinosauria
- Clade: †Ornithischia
- Clade: †Thyreophora
- Genus: †Scutellosaurus; Colbert, 1981
- Species: †S. lawleri

Binomial name
- †Scutellosaurus lawleri Colbert, 1981

= Scutellosaurus =

Scutellosaurus Temporal range: Early Jurassic, 196 Ma

Extinct genus of dinosaurs

Scutellosaurus (/skuːˌtɛloʊˈsɔːrəs/ skoo-TEL-oh-SOR-əs) is a genus of basal thyreophoran dinosaur that lived approximately 196 million years ago during the early part of the Jurassic Period in what is now Arizona, USA. It is classified in Thyreophora, the armoured dinosaurs; its closest relatives may have been Emausaurus and Scelidosaurus, another armored dinosaur which was mainly a quadrupedal dinosaur, unlike bipedal Scutellosaurus. It is one of the earliest representatives of the armored dinosaurs and the basalmost form discovered to date. Scutellosaurus was a small, lightly-built, ground-dwelling herbivore, that could grow up to an estimated 1.3 metres (4.3 ft) long.

== Discovery and naming ==
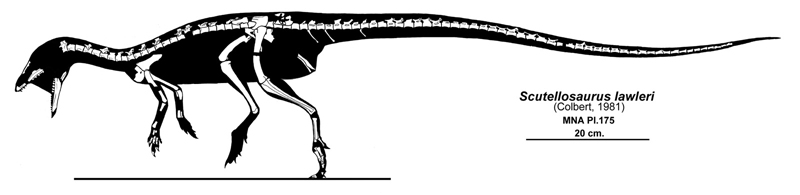
Skeletal diagram showing known material, excluding osteoderms

The first skeletons of ornithischians from the Kayenta Formation were found in June 1971 by David Lawler, at the time an intern at the Museum of Northern Arizona. He uncovered a nearly complete skeleton with a few pieces of the skull of am armored dinosaur southeast of the Rock Head landmark at a locality designated MNA Locality 219-1. Before these remains were described, a second, larger and less complete skeleton was found 16 km (9.9 mi) northwest at MNA Locality 291-5 along Gold Spring Wash by William Amaral as part of a joint MNA and Museum of Comparative Zoology expedition in July 1977 funded by the National Science Foundation and permitted to the MNA. These two specimens were described in 1981 by American paleontologist Edwin H. Colbert, who was a Research Associate at the MNA after retiring from a long tenure as the Curator of Fossil Reptiles of the American Museum of Natural History. Colbert initially published the first and second specimens under the numbers MNA P1.175 and MNA P1.1752 respectively, but in 1982 or 1983, and then again in 2000, the MNA changed their vertebrate fossil collection numbering procedures so they are now known as MNA.V.175 and MNA.V.1752. An individual femur collected at the same time that Colbert referred to the armored ornithischian but did not describe is MNA.V.109. Colbert gave the new genus and species binomial Scutellosaurus lawleri to this armored ornithischian - MNA.V.175 as its holotype - with the genus name derived from the Latin scutellum, a little shield, and Greek σαῦρος (sauros), a lizard or reptile, and the species name in honour of the discoverer of the holotype, Lawler.

Further expeditions between the MNA and MCZ from 1978 to 1982, reposited at the MCZ but permitted under Navajo Nation Antiquities Permits for the MNA, uncovered several more specimens of Scutellosaurus, though 1978 specimens were referred to in the field as "cf. Kayentasaurus lawleri" as the tentative name given to the taxon before by Colbert its formal description. 20 specimens of Scutellosaurus (two which are not yet catalogued) were collected from the Kayenta Formation of Gold Spring for the MCZ by these expeditions, including partial skeletons found by Amaral, Hans-Dieter Sues, Charles R. Schaff, Timothy B. Rowe, B. Schubert, Williams Downs, and Kathleen ("Kayenta Kate") Smith. Similar expeditions were made by the University of California Museum of Paleontology between 1981 and 1983, led by James M. Clark under permits to the MNA, which collected four specimens from a single locality ("Lower Blue"; all collected by Clark), with one from Gold Springs (collected by Clark) and another from "Red Knob" (collected by Emily CoBabe). At least 46 further individuals of Scutellosaurus were discovered during 1997 to 2000 expeditions by the University of Texas at Austin under permits from the Navajo Nation Minerals Division; fieldwork was collaborative with the Navajo EcoScouts program. These specimens were within the vertebrate paleontology collections at the time an administrative unit of the Texas Memorial Museum but part of the Jackson School of Geosciences. The most significant of these specimens are TxVP 43663-1 and TxVP 43664-1, which both include parts of the skull and skeleton not previously known from Scutellosaurus.

The extensive specimens have made Scutellosaurus the most abundant dinosaur from the Kayenta Formation. All known specimens have been collected from the "silty facies" of the formation, and most from the fluvial and blue mudstone that lies about 20–30 m (66–98 ft) above the base. These are exposed on the land of the Navajo Nation in northern Arizona, forming a steep line of cliffs with little surface for prospecting. At the southernmost extent of these cliffs they broaden and form a bench of heavy badlands from which most specimens of Scutellosaurus have been collected. The holotype of Sarahsaurus was also collected from one locality of the "silty facies", and during its preparation zircon crystals were collected for uranium-lead dating, which had preliminary results returning an age of 183.7 ± 2.7 million years ago. This date can thus establish these deposits, informally written in field notes as the "middle third" of the Kayenta Formation, as Pliensbachian and Toarcian and part of the Lower Jurassic, much younger than earlier suggestions of a Triassic age.

The holotype specimen was described by Edwin Colbert (1981) based on the following: partially preserved premaxillae with teeth, a right maxilla with seven teeth, a left maxilla with five teeth, dentaries that are missing their posterior portions, a left dentary with 18 teeth, a right dentary with 10 teeth, other skull fragments, 21 presacral vertebral centra, several complete and partial neural arches and spines, five sacral vertebrae, 58 caudal vertebrae with neural arches and several chevrons, several incomplete ribs, both scapulae, both coracoids, partially preserved ilia, fragments of the pubic bones and of the ischia, both humeri, the distal end of the right radius, the proximal and distal ends of the left radius and ulna, fragments of the manus, both femora, the right tibia, the proximal end of the right fibula, the right astragalus, the left tibia, the left fibula, various bones of the pedes, including a possible distal tarsal bone, and over 300 osteoderms.

== Description ==
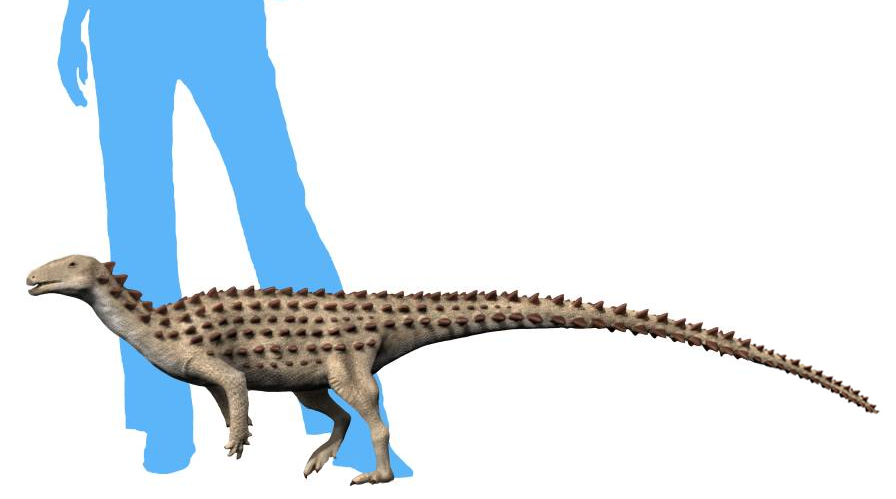
Life restoration with size comparison

Scutellosaurus was lightly built, and was probably capable of walking on its hind legs. It had an unusually long tail, possibly to provide a counterbalance against the weight of the armored body. It was a relatively small dinosaur, measuring 1.3 m (4.3 ft) in length and 3 kg (6.6 lb) in body mass. The fossil evidence includes several partial skeletons recovered from Arizona by the Museum of Northern Arizona and the University of California Museum of Paleontology, although the skull is poorly known from these specimens. There were several hundred osteoderms running along its neck to its back and as far down as its tail. These formed parallel rows, with as many as five rows on each side. It also had double rows of osteoderms, or external plates, running neck to tail. Some of these shields were flat, while others were pitted.

== Classification ==
Scutellosaurus was at first classified by Colbert as a member of the ornithopod family Fabrosauridae, a group of generalized and primitive ornithischians. Though both the origins of ornithischians and fabrosaurids were unclear to Colbert, he suggested it was possible that Scutellosaurus retained the armor from some ancestral thecodont similar to Hesperosuchus, and that Scutellosaurus may in turn have given rise to the armored Stegosauridae and Ankylosauridae. Following the beginning of phylogenetics for dinosaur evolution, it became understood that both "Thecodontia" and "Fabrosauridae" were paraphyletic constructs, and that Scutellosaurus was in fact a relative of the later armored ornithischians. Scutellosaurus was included in phylogenetic analyses that reconstructed it as an early-diverging member of the armored ornithischian group Thyreophora, with its later relatives including Scelidosaurus, the only early thyreophoran known from complete and articulated skeletons, and Emausaurus, in addition to the clades Stegosauria and Ankylosauria that Colbert had first suggested Scutellosaurus was related to. The phylogenetic analysis of Breeden and Rowe in 2020 is below.

- Thyreophora
  - Scutellosaurus
  - - Emausaurus
    - - Scelidosaurus
      - Eurypoda
        - Stegosauria
        - Ankylosauria

Scutellosaurus has also been designated as the nominal genus for the clade Scutellosauridae, coined in 1990 by Lambert. Though the original members, Scutellosaurus, Echinodon, Tatisaurus, and Trimucrodon, have not been reconstructed as relatives in any recent analyses, there is also no support for Scutellosaurus being a member of another clade such as Scelidosauridae. As a result, Scutellosauridae can be considered to only include Scutellosaurus, and it may eventually prove useful if a clade of Scutellosaurus and Emausaurus or Scutellosaurus and Laquintasaura is supported in the future.

== Palaeobiology ==
=== Life history ===
Osteohistology suggests that Scutellosaurus had a slower rate of growth than many larger dinosaurs. It grew at a rate of about 40 cm in length per year, reaching adult body length in about two to three years.
