= Navajo Sandstone =

Geologic formation in the southwestern United States

- Stratigraphic range: Hettangian-Sinemurian; ~200–195 Ma
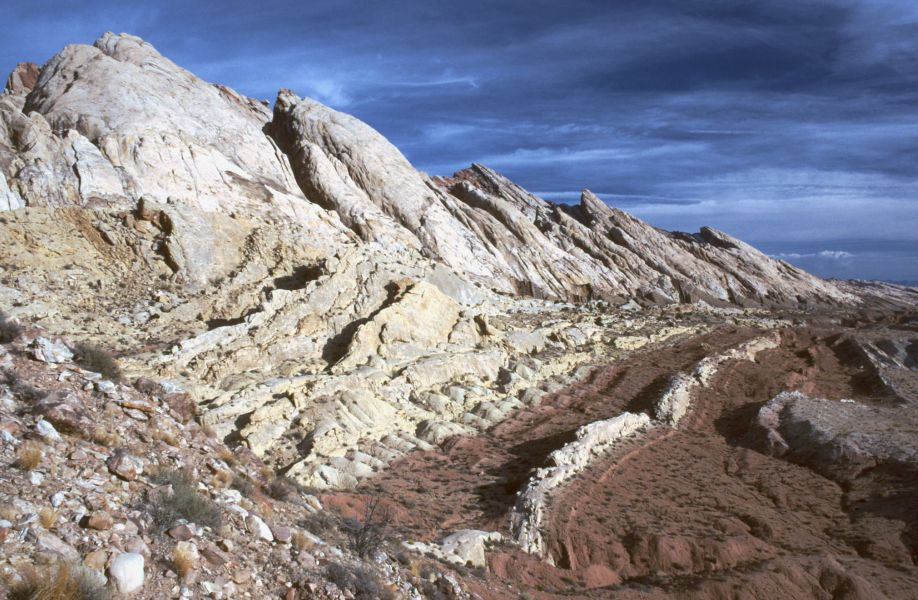
- A prominent cuesta of Navajo Sandstone rims the edge of the San Rafael Swell in eastern Utah
- Type: Geological formation
- Unit of: Glen Canyon Group
- Underlies: Carmel Formation and Page and Temple Cap sandstones, separated by J-1 and J-2 unconformities
- Overlies: Kayenta Formation with conformable and interfingering contact
- Thickness: Up to 2,300 ft (700 m)

Lithology
- Primary: Eolian sandstone
- Other: Lacustrine limestone and dolomite

Location
- Coordinates: 36.7°N 110.8°W
- Approximate paleocoordinates: 23.9°N 48.5°W
- Region: Arizona, Colorado, Nevada, Utah
- Country: United States of America
- Extent: 102,300 sq mi (264,955.8 km^{2}) - original extent of the Navajo Sand Sea may have been 2.5 times larger than this remaining outcrop

Type section
- Named for: Navajo County
- Named by: Gregory and Stone
- Year defined: 1917
- Navajo Sandstone (the United States) Navajo Sandstone (Arizona)

The Navajo Sandstone is a geological formation in the Glen Canyon Group that is spread across the U.S. states of southern Nevada, northern Arizona, northwest Colorado, and Utah as part of the Colorado Plateau province of the United States.

== Description ==
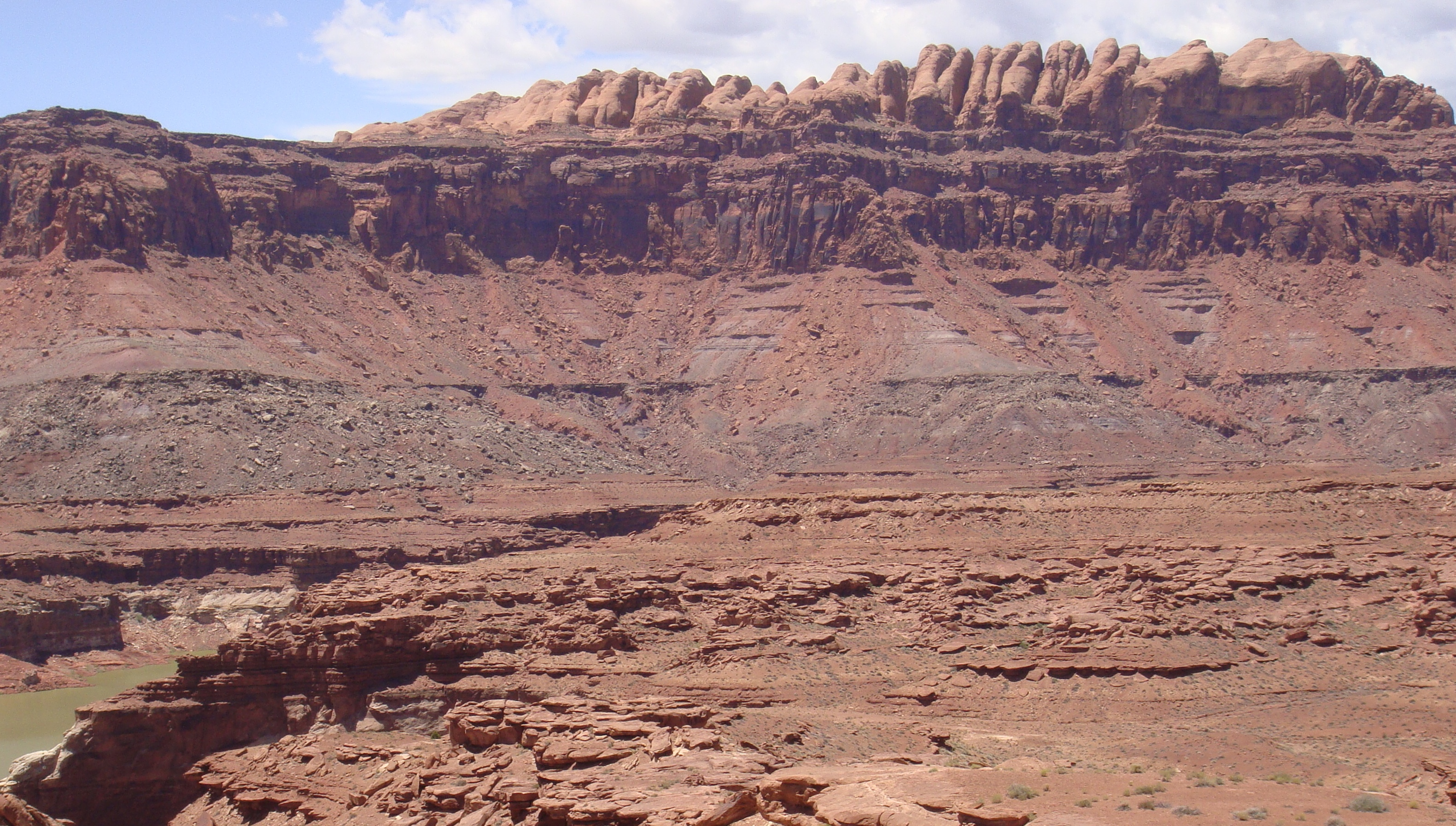
The Permian through Jurassic stratigraphy of the Colorado Plateau area of southeastern Utah that makes up much of the famous prominent rock formations in protected areas such as Capitol Reef National Park and Canyonlands National Park. From top to bottom: Rounded tan domes of the Navajo Sandstone, layered red Kayenta Formation, cliff-forming, vertically jointed, red Wingate Sandstone, slope-forming, purplish Chinle Formation, layered, lighter-red Moenkopi Formation, and white, layered Cutler Formation sandstone. Picture from Glen Canyon National Recreation Area, Utah.

The Navajo Sandstone is particularly prominent in southern Utah, where it forms the main attractions of a number of national parks and monuments including Arches National Park, Zion National Park, Capitol Reef National Park, Canyonlands National Park, Glen Canyon National Recreation Area, and Grand Staircase–Escalante National Monument.

Navajo Sandstone frequently overlies and interfingers with the Kayenta Formation of the Glen Canyon Group. Together, these formations can result in immense vertical cliffs of up to 2,200 feet (670 m). Atop the cliffs, Navajo Sandstone often appears as massive rounded domes and bluffs that are generally white in color.

=== Appearance and provenance ===
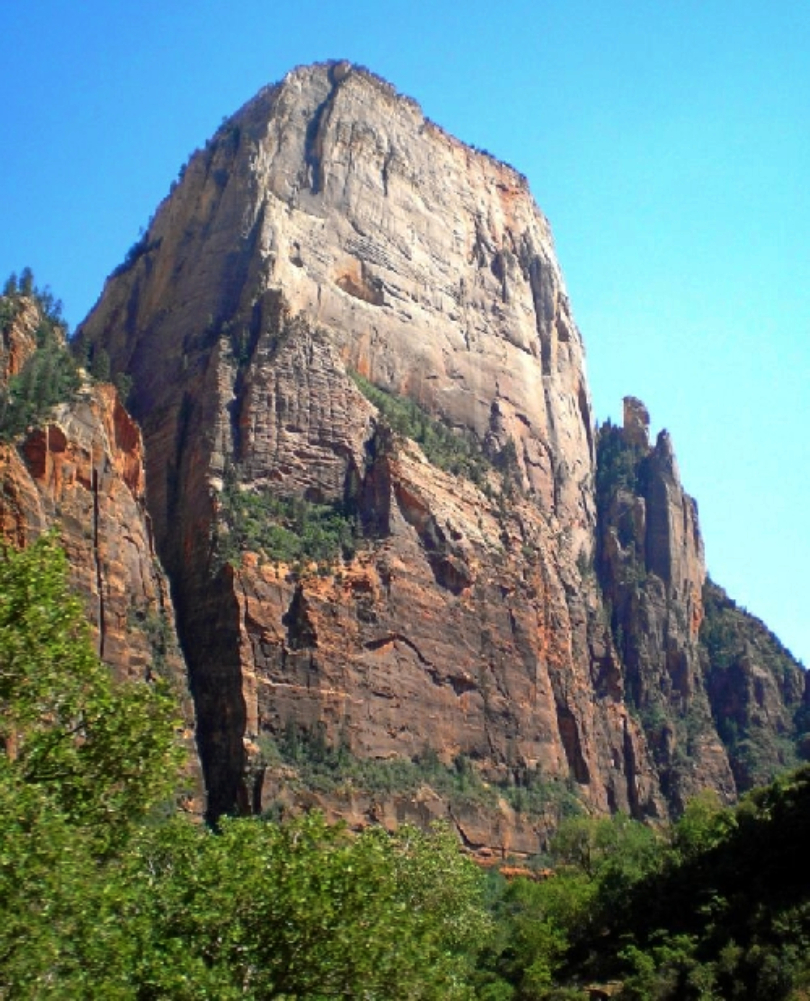
The Great White Throne in Zion National Park is an example of white Navajo Sandstone

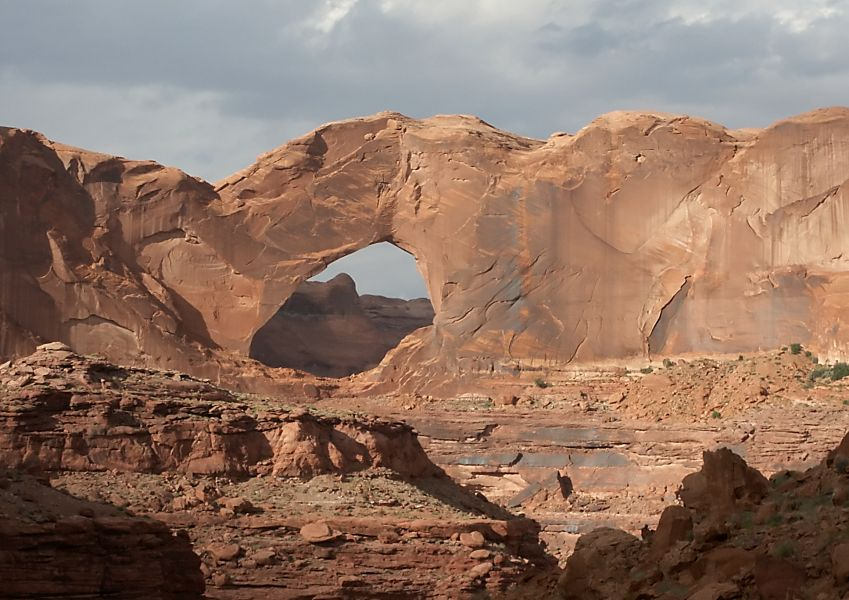
Stevens Arch, near the mouth of Coyote Gulch in the Canyons of the Escalante, is formed from a layer of Navajo Sandstone. The opening is 220 feet (67 m) wide and 160 feet (49 m) high.

Navajo Sandstone frequently occurs as spectacular cliffs, cuestas, domes, and bluffs rising from the desert floor. It can be distinguished from adjacent Jurassic sandstones by its white to light pink color, meter-scale cross-bedding, and distinctive rounded weathering.

The wide range of colors exhibited by the Navajo Sandstone reflect a long history of alteration by groundwater and other subsurface fluids over the last 190 million years. The different colors, except for white, are caused by the presence of varying mixtures and amounts of hematite, goethite, and limonite filling the pore space within the quartz sand comprising the Navajo Sandstone. The iron in these strata originally arrived via the erosion of iron-bearing silicate minerals.

Initially, this iron accumulated as iron-oxide coatings, which formed slowly after the sand had been deposited. Later, after having been deeply buried, reducing fluids composed of water and hydrocarbons flowed through the thick red sand which once comprised the Navajo Sandstone. The dissolution of the iron coatings by the reducing fluids bleached large volumes of the Navajo Sandstone a brilliant white. Reducing fluids transported the iron in solution until they mixed with oxidizing groundwater. Where the oxidizing and reducing fluids mixed, the iron precipitated within the Navajo Sandstone.

Depending on local variations within the permeability, porosity, fracturing, and other inherent rock properties of the sandstone, varying mixtures of hematite, goethite, and limonite precipitated within spaces between quartz grains. Variations in the type and proportions of precipitated iron oxides resulted in the different black, brown, crimson, vermillion, orange, salmon, peach, pink, gold, and yellow colors of the Navajo Sandstone.

The precipitation of iron oxides also formed laminae, corrugated layers, columns, and pipes of ironstone within the Navajo Sandstone. Being harder and more resistant to erosion than the surrounding sandstone, the ironstone weathered out as ledges, walls, fins, "flags", towers, and other minor features, which stick out and above the local landscape in unusual shapes.

== Age and history of investigation ==
The age of the Navajo Sandstone is somewhat controversial. It may originate from the Late Triassic but is at least as young as the Early Jurassic stages Pliensbachian and Toarcian. There is no type locality of the name. It was simply named for the 'Navajo Country' of the southwestern United States. The two major subunits of the Navajo are the Lamb Point Tongue (Kanab area) and the Shurtz Sandstone Tongue (Cedar City area).

The Navajo Sandstone was originally named as the uppermost formation of the La Plata Group by Gregory and Stone in 1917. Baker reassigned it as the upper formation of Glen Canyon Group in 1936. Its age was modified by Lewis and others in 1961. The name was originally not used in northwest Colorado and northeast Utah, where the name 'Glen Canyon Sandstone' was preferred.

A 2019 radioisotopic analysis suggests that the Navajo Sandstone formation dates to the early Jurassic and began around 200-195 million years ago. Kevin Padian stated in 1989 that the Navajo Sandstone extended into the Toarcian Stage.

== Depositional environment ==
The sandstone was deposited in an arid erg on the Western portion of the Supercontinent Pangaea. This region was affected by annual monsoons that came about each winter when cooler winds and wind reversal occurred.

== Outcrop localities ==
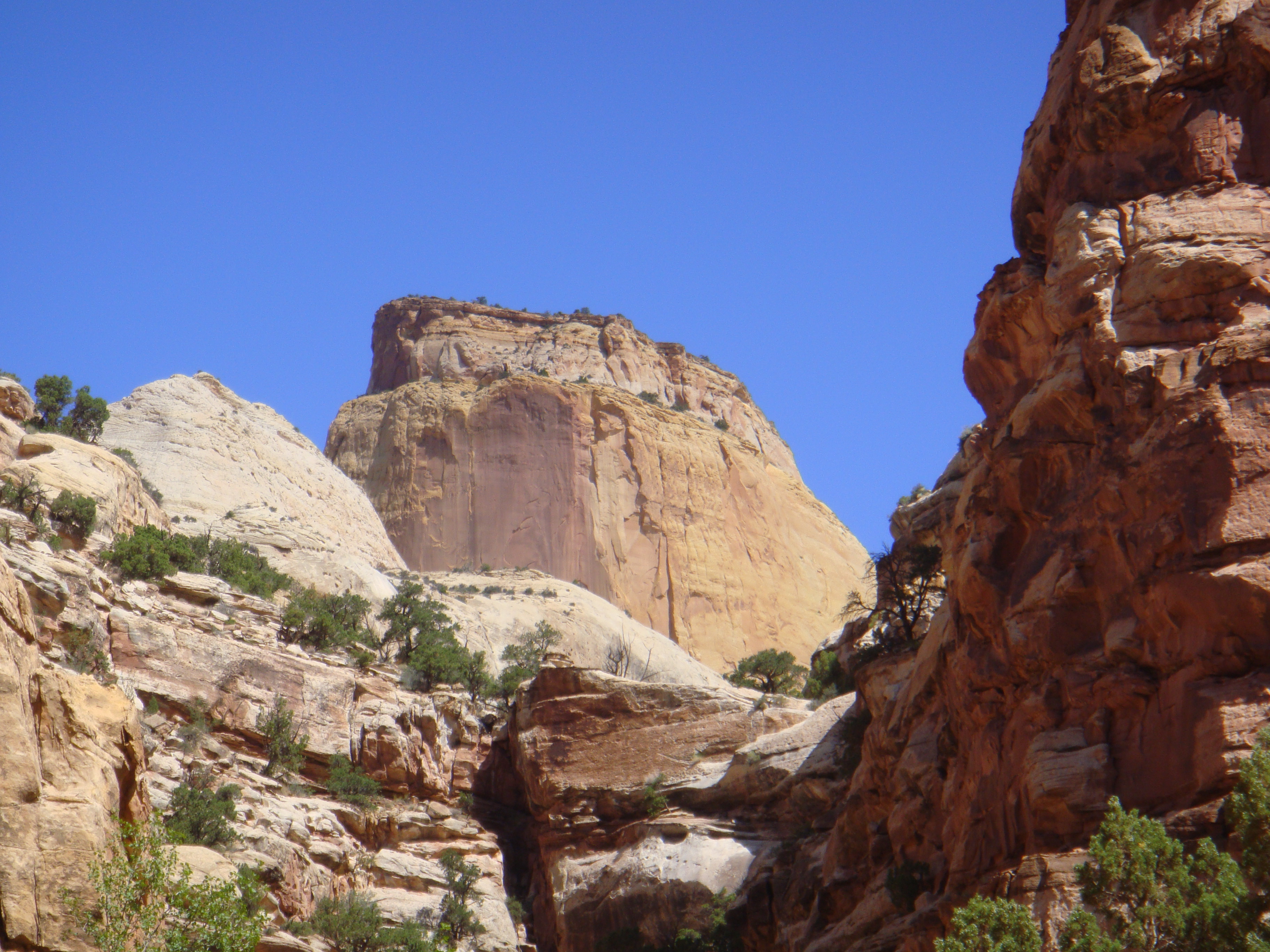
The Golden Throne, a rock formation in Capitol Reef National Park. Though the park is famous for white domes of the Navajo Sandstone, this dome's color is a result of a lingering section of yellow Carmel Formation carbonate, which has stained the underlying rock.

Navajo Sandstone outcrops are found in these geologic locations:

- Colorado Plateau
- Black Mesa Basin
- Great Basin province
- Paradox Basin
- Piceance Basin
- Plateau Sedimentary Province
- San Juan Basin
- Uinta Basin
- Uinta Uplift
- Uncompaghre Uplift

The formation is also found in these parklands (incomplete list):

- Glen Canyon National Recreation Area
- Grand Staircase–Escalante National Monument
- Zion National Park
- Canyonlands National Park
- Capitol Reef National Park
- Arches National Park
- Dinosaur National Monument
- Navajo National Monument
- Colorado National Monument
- Coral Pink Sand Dunes State Park, Kanab, Utah

== Vertebrate paleofauna ==
=== Ornithodires ===
Indeterminate theropod remains geographically located in Arizona, USA. Theropod tracks are geographically located in Arizona, Colorado, and Utah, USA. Ornithischian tracks located in Arizona, USA.

Color key: Taxon / Reclassified taxon / Taxon falsely reported as present / Dubious taxon or junior synonym / Ichnotaxon / Ootaxon / Morphotaxon	Notes; Uncertain or tentative taxa are in small text; ~~crossed out~~ taxa are discredited.

Ornithodires of the Navajo Sandstone
Genus	Species	Location	Stratigraphic position	Material	Notes	Images
Ammosaurus	Ammosaurus cf. major	Arizona			Prosauropod. Junior synonym of Anchisaurus.	Ammosaurus Dilophosaurus Segisaurus Seitaad
Dilophosaurus		D. wetherilli	Utah		Attributed footprint trackways at Red Fleet State Park.	Ammosaurus Dilophosaurus Segisaurus Seitaad
Pteraichnus						Ammosaurus Dilophosaurus Segisaurus Seitaad
Segisaurus	S. halli	Arizona		"Partial postcranial skeleton."	Theropod.	Ammosaurus Dilophosaurus Segisaurus Seitaad
Seitaad	S. ruessi	Utah			Prosauropod.	Ammosaurus Dilophosaurus Segisaurus Seitaad

== Iron oxide concretions ==
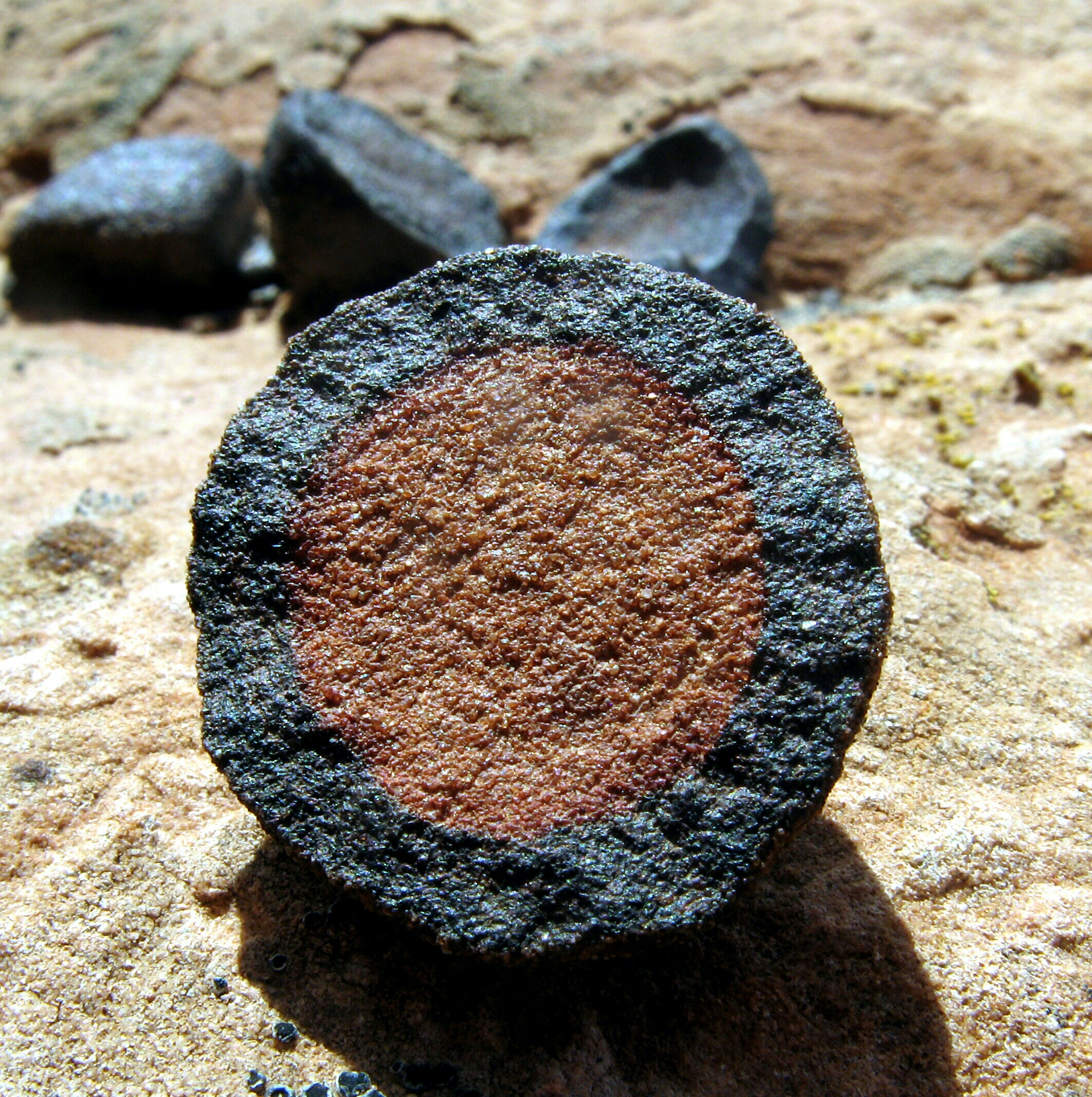
Interior of a Moqui Marble

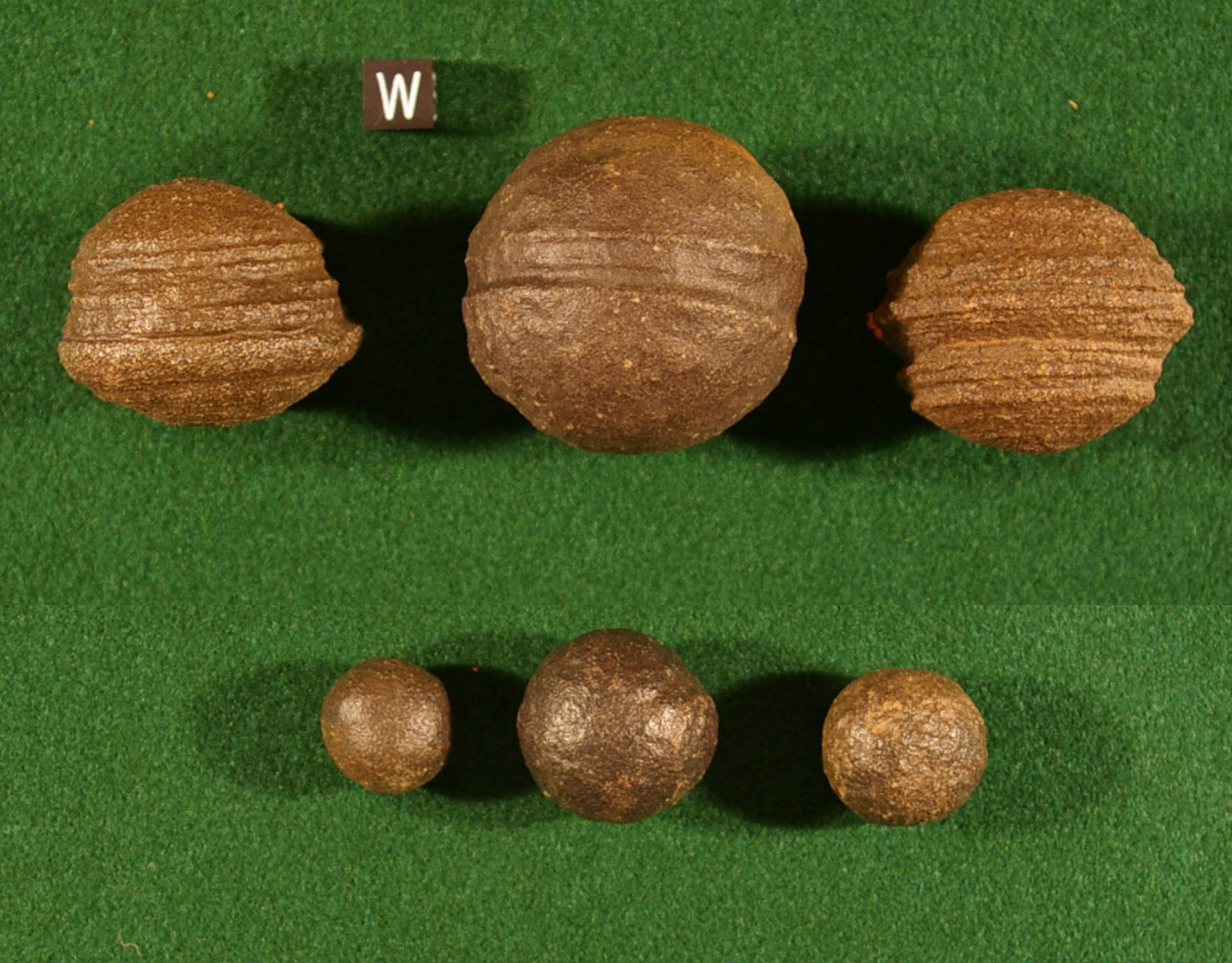
Moqui Marbles, hematite concretions, from the Navajo Sandstone of southeast Utah. Scale cube, with "W", is one centimeter square.

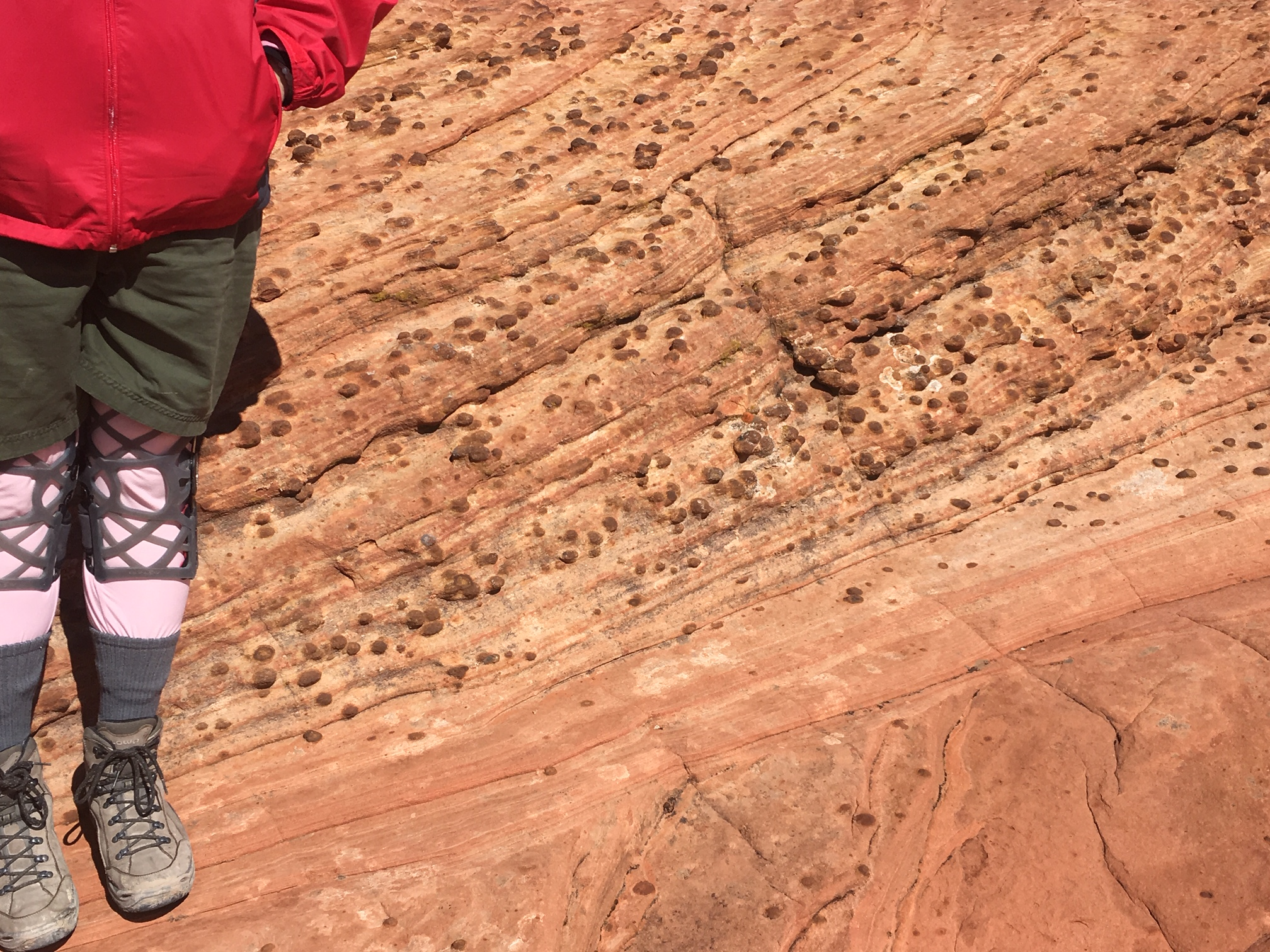
Moqui Marbles in place in the Navajo Sandstone, Snow Canyon State Park, SW Utah.

The Navajo Sandstone is also well known among rockhounds for its hundreds of thousands of iron oxide concretions. Informally, they are called "Moqui Marbles" and are believed to represent an extension of Hopi Native American traditions regarding ancestor worship ("moqui" translates to "the dead" in the Hopi language). Thousands of these concretions weather out of outcrops of the Navajo Sandstone within south-central and southeastern Utah within an area extending from Zion National Park eastward to Arches and Canyonland national parks. They are abundant within Grand Staircase–Escalante National Monument.

The iron oxide concretions found in the Navajo Sandstone exhibit a wide variety of sizes and shapes. Their shape ranges from spheres to discs; buttons; spiked balls; cylindrical hollow pipe-like forms; and other odd shapes. Although many of these concretions are fused together like soap bubbles, many more also occur as isolated concretions, which range in diameter from the size of peas to baseballs. The surface of these spherical concretions can range from being very rough to quite smooth. Some of the concretions are grooved spheres with ridges around their circumference.

The abundant concretions found in the Navajo Sandstone consist of sandstone cemented together by hematite (Fe_{2}O_{3}), and goethite (FeOOH). The iron forming these concretions came from the breakdown of iron-bearing silicate minerals by weathering to form iron oxide coatings on other grains. During later diagenesis of the Navajo Sandstone while deeply buried, reducing fluids, likely hydrocarbons, dissolved these coatings. When the reducing fluids containing dissolved iron mixed with oxidizing groundwater, they and the dissolved iron were oxidized. This caused the iron to precipitate out as hematite and goethite to form the innumerable concretions found in the Navajo Sandstone. Evidence suggests that microbial metabolism may have contributed to the formation of some of these concretions. These concretions are regarded as terrestrial analogues of the hematite spherules, called alternately Martian "blueberries" or more technically Martian spherules, which the Opportunity rover found at Meridiani Planum on Mars.

== See also ==
- List of fossiliferous stratigraphic units in Utah
- Toarcian turnover
- Toarcian formations
  - Marne di Monte Serrone, Italy
  - Calcare di Sogno, Italy
  - Sachrang Formation, Austria
  - Posidonia Shale, Lagerstätte in Germany
  - Ciechocinek Formation, Germany and Poland
  - Krempachy Marl Formation, Poland and Slovakia
  - Lava Formation, Lithuania
  - Azilal Group, North Africa
  - Whitby Mudstone, England
  - Fernie Formation, Alberta and British Columbia
    - Poker Chip Shale
  - Whiteaves Formation, British Columbia
  - Los Molles Formation, Argentina
  - Mawson Formation, Antarctica
  - Kandreho Formation, Madagascar
  - Kota Formation, India
  - Cattamarra Coal Measures, Australia
