= Eopneumatosuchus =

Eopneumatosuchus Temporal range: Early Jurassic, 196.5–183.0 Ma

Scientific classification
- Kingdom: Animalia
- Phylum: Chordata
- Class: Reptilia
- Clade: Pseudosuchia
- Clade: Crocodylomorpha
- Genus: †Eopneumatosuchus; Crompton and Smith, 1980
- Species: †E. colberti

Binomial name
- †Eopneumatosuchus colberti Crompton and Smith, 1980

Extinct genus of reptiles

Eopneumatosuchus is an extinct genus of basal crocodyliform. Fossils have been found from two localities within the Kayenta Formation of Arizona. Both localities are around 20 miles southeast of the Grand Canyon and near one another. The localities probably date back to the Early Jurassic, most likely during the Sinemurian stage.

== Classification ==
Eopneumatosuchus was initially considered to be a protosuchian, first proposed when the genus was named in 1980. However, this classification was later questioned on the basis of several features of the holotype material, and as a result it is no longer considered to be within Protosuchia. Particular features of the posterior part of the cranium, the only material associated with the genus, suggest that Eopneumatosuchus may have close relations with Early Jurassic teleosaurs. The large supratemporal fenestrae of Eopneumatosuchus are characteristic of longirostrine crocodilians. Despite the similar cranial morphology with crocodilians, the genus is currently regarded as a basal crocodyliform. Nonetheless, it is considered to be more derived than protosuchians such as Protosuchus, found from the Moenave Formation, whose deposition preceded that of the Kayenta Formation. The basicranium had many cavities that made up a complex tympanic pneumatic system for which the genus has been named. These types of cavities can also be seen in some protosuchians such as Protosuchus and Hemiprotosuchus, although they are less elongated than in Eopneumatosuchus.
