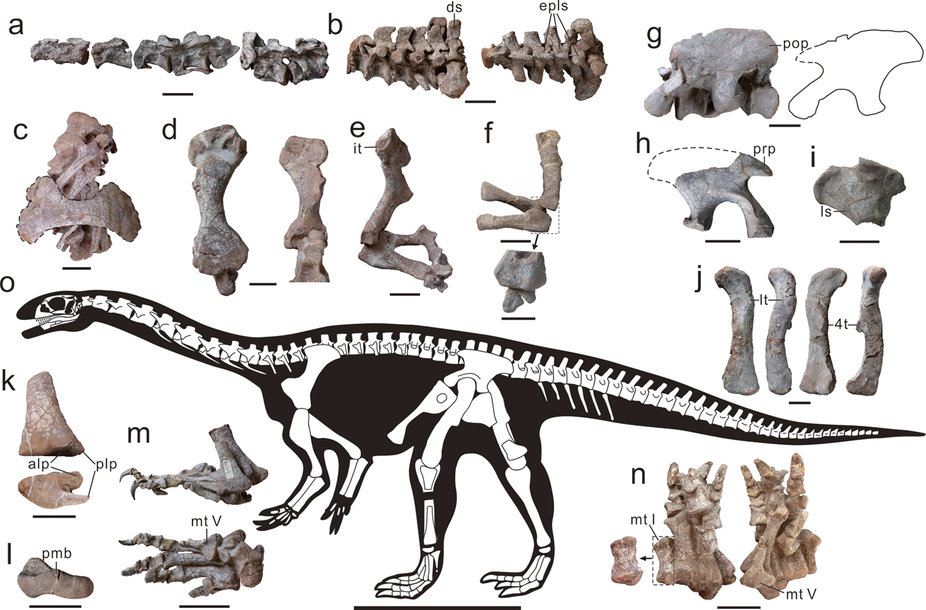
- Photographs of skeletal elements (a-n) and skeletal reconstruction (o) of Xingxiulong chengi

Scientific classification
- Kingdom: Animalia
- Phylum: Chordata
- Clade: Dinosauria
- Clade: Saurischia
- Clade: †Sauropodomorpha
- Clade: †Sauropodiformes
- Genus: †Xingxiulong; Wang et al., 2017

Type species
- †Xingxiulong chengi Wang et al., 2017

Other species
- †Xingxiulong yueorum Chen et al., 2025

= Xingxiulong =

Xingxiulong Temporal range: Early Jurassic, Hettangian

Genus of sauropodomorph dinosaurs

Xingxiulong (meaning "Xingxiu Bridge dragon") is a genus of bipedal massopodan sauropodomorph from the Early Jurassic of China. It contains two species; the type species is X. chengi, described by Wang et al. in 2017 from three specimens, two adults and an immature individual, that collectively constitute a mostly complete skeleton. Adults of this species measured 4–5 metres (13–16 ft) long and 1–1.5 metres (3.3–4.9 ft) tall. A second species, X. yueorum, was described by Chen et al. in 2025 based on a partial articulated postcranial skeleton of an adult individual larger than X. chengi.

Phylogenetic analysis suggests that Xingxiulong is most closely related to its contemporary Jingshanosaurus, although an alternative position outside of both the Sauropodiformes and Massospondylidae is also plausible. Despite their close relationship, Xingxiulong prominently differs from Jingshanosaurus—and from most basal sauropodomorphs—in having a number of sauropod-like traits. These include a sacrum containing four vertebrae; a pubis with an exceptionally long top portion; and the femur, the first and fifth metatarsals on the foot, and the scapula being wide and robust. These probably represent adaptations to supporting high body weight, in particular a large gut. Unlike sauropods, however, Xingxiulong may have still been bipedal.

== Discovery and naming ==
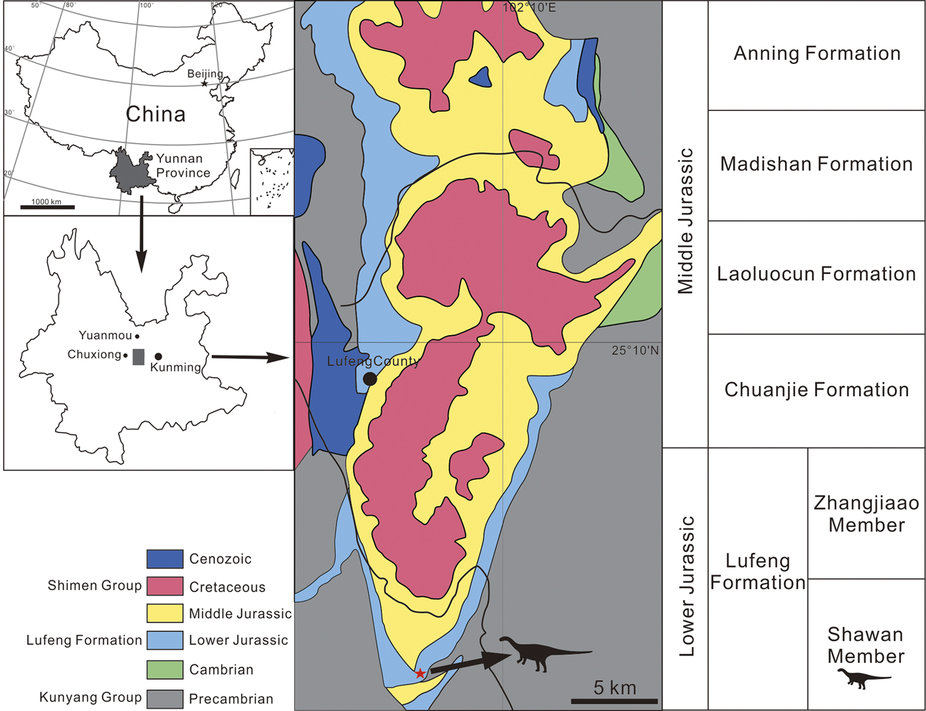
Map and location in the stratigraphic column of the type locality of Xingxiulong chengi

LFGT-D0002, the mature holotype specimen of Xingxiulong chengi, consists of a partial skull with jaws; the seventh to ninth cervical vertebrae, the eighth to fourteenth dorsal vertebrae, the entire sacrum, and 35 caudal vertebrae; rib and chevron fragments; the left ilium, and parts of both pubes and ischia; both femora and tibiae, parts of the fibula, the left ankle, and both feet (nearly complete).

Two specimens were referred to X. chengi. LFGT-D0003, also mature, consists of a partial skull with jaws; the third to tenth cervical vertebrae, as well as all of the dorsal vertebrae and most of the sacrum; rib and chevron fragments; both scapulae, humeri, ulnae, and radii, as well as part of the hand; parts of both ilia (the right one is complete) and pubes (the left one is complete); the left femur, parts of both tibiae and fibulae (the right ones are complete), as well as the right ankle and parts of the feet. LFGT-D0001, which is smaller and probably immature, consists of the axis, the third to tenth cervical vertebrae, all of the dorsal vertebrae and sacrum, and the first nineteenth caudal vertebrae; rib and chevron fragments; the right scapula and ilium, as well as parts of the right pubis and ischium; parts of the femora and left tibia, along with the left ankle.

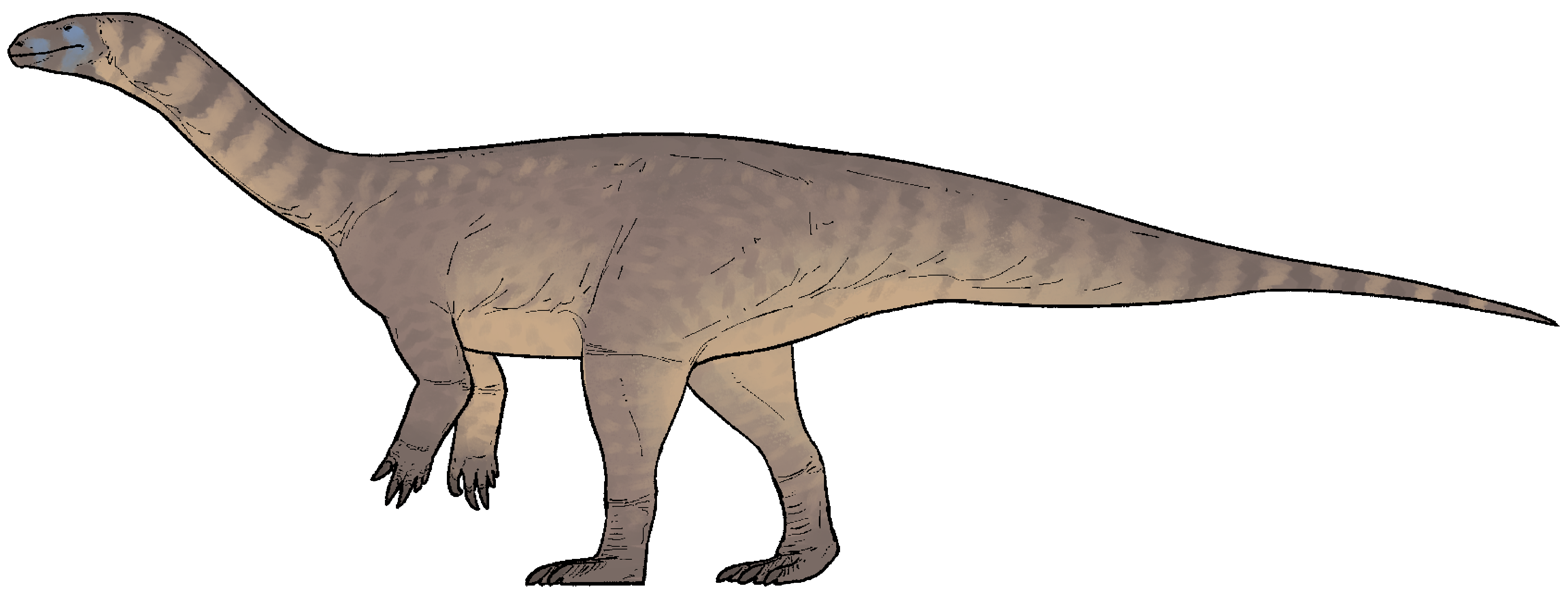
Restoration of X. yueorum

These specimens were discovered, buried together, near the Sankeshu Village of Lufeng County, Yunnan, China in 2013, and are stored at the Bureau of Land and Resources of Lufeng County. The rocks that these specimens were preserved in, consisting of purple silty mudstone, belong to the Early Jurassic Shawan Member of the Lufeng Formation, which has been tentatively dated to being Hettangian in age.

Xingxiulong was described in 2017 by Ya-Ming Wang, Hai-Lu You, and Tao Wang. The generic name (literally meaning "constellation") refers to the Xingxiu Bridge (星宿), which was constructed during the Ming Dynasty of China. Meanwhile, the specific name chengi honours Professor Zheng-Wu Cheng, who made major contributions to the biostratigraphy of China, including that of the Lufeng area, and died in 2015.

In 2025, Xiang-Yuan Chen, Ya-Ming Wang, Qian-Nan Zhang, Tao Wang & Hai-Lu You described LF2015-NO01 as the holotype of a second species of Xingxiulong, X. yueorum. The specimen consists of most of a articulated postcranial skeleton, including 13 dorsal vertebrae, 11 paired ribs, four sacral vertebrae, 20 caudal vertebrae and associated chevrons, part of the left scapula, and both pelvic girdles and hindlimbs. It was discovered by the Bureau of Natural Resources of Lufeng City in 2015 in outcrops of the Zhangjiaao Member of the Lufeng Formation. These sediments are located in Erzuanshan, Yunnan Province. The specific name honors the siblings of Shu-Yong Yue for their work in collecting and preparing Lufeng dinosaur fossils, including the X. yueorum.

== Description ==
=== Size ===
Size of Xingxiulong chengi compared to a human

Xingxiulong was a medium- to large-sized sauropodomorph. Adults of X. chengi are estimated at 4–5 metres (13–16 ft) long and 1–1.5 metres (3.3–4.9 ft) tall at the hip. The two larger specimens, LFGT-D0002 and LFGT-D0003, are adults judging by the complete fusion in their skull; the third specimen, LFGT-D0001, is 14% smaller and probably represents a subadult judging by the incomplete fusion in the vertebrae.

The holotype of X. yueorum is larger than adult specimens of X. chengi and is estimated to have been 8–10 metres (26–33 ft) long in life; the longest femur of X. chengi is about 56 centimetres (22 in) long, while the femur of X. yueorum is 78 centimetres (31 in) long.

=== Skull and jaw ===
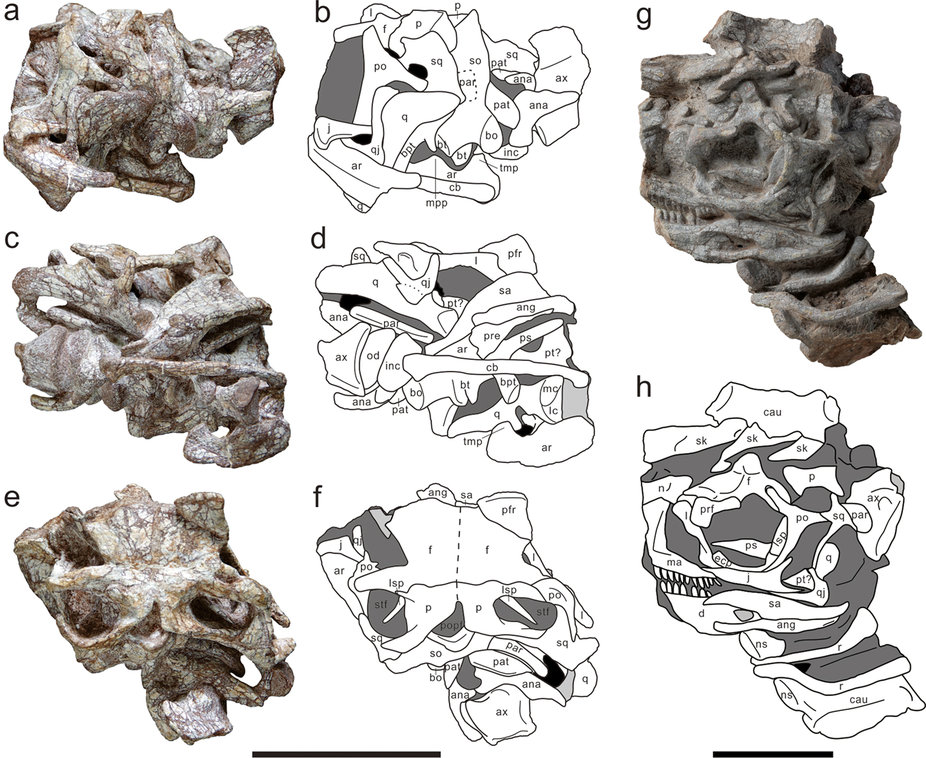
Detail of the skull and jaw of Xingxiulong chengi

Unlike the contemporary Lufengosaurus, Xingxiulong does not have a ridge on the side of its maxilla. Eleven tooth sockets are preserved along the length of the maxilla. Further back, in front of the eye socket, the lacrimal bears a prominent projection near the top of its front end, which is also seen in Lufengosaurus, Adeopapposaurus, Massospondylus, and Riojasaurus, but not Yunnanosaurus, Jingshanosaurus, or subsequent sauropodiforms. The contact surface between the jugal bone and postorbital bone is fairly long, like Lufengosaurus but not Yunnanosaurus. Among the three branches of the jugal, the backwards-directed branch forms an angle of 80° with the upwards-projecting branch, which is similar to Plateosaurus and Thecodontosaurus but much larger than other sauropodomorphs.

At the base of the skull, the quadratojugal bears two branches, one pointing forwards and one upwards; they are roughly perpendicular to each other, unlike Lufengosaurus (angle of 45°), Yunnanosaurus (angle of 60°), and Jingshanosaurus (angle of 110°). Above the quadratojugal, the quadrate has two articulating condyles, a subtriangular one facing outward and a more rounded one facing inwards; the latter condyle is placed closer to the bottom, like Lufengosaurus and Yunnanosaurus but not Plateosaurus. At the back of the skull, between the parietals and supraoccipitals, there is a prominently developed postparietal fenestra; the supraoccipital itself slopes forwards at its bottom end so as to round off the base of the skull. The basipterygoid processes are long, slender, and project downwards and outwards like Plateosaurus and unlike Lufengosaurus and Jingshanosaurus, forming an angle of 80° with each other.

Compared to Lufengosaurus, Yunnanosaurus, and Jingshanosaurus, the angular and surangular extend much further in front of the mandibular fenestra in Xingxiulong, which is closer to Adeopapposaurus and Plateosaurus. The articular bears an inward-projecting and pyramidal process as an extension of the jaw joint; at its back end, it also possesses an upward-directed and tab-like process, which is also seen in Coloradisaurus, Jingshanosaurus, and an as-of-yet unnamed sauropodomorph.

=== Vertebrae ===
There are ten cervical vertebrae in the neck of Xingxiulong. The proatlas, an atrophied vertebra positioned in front of the atlas, is bounded in front by top sides of the foramen magnum. While it is difficult to say much about the atlas itself due to damage, the immediately following axis has a relatively short centrum, which is slightly compressed on its sides and bottom. Overall, the remainder of the cervical vertebrae are relatively short, being only 2.5 to 3 times as long as they are tall; they become increasingly shorter towards the back of the neck, like Lufengosaurus. Other basal sauropodomorphs, including Jingshanosaurus, have cervical vertebrae that are generally 3 to 4 times as long as they are tall. On the bottom of the centra of cervical vertebrae 4-9, there is a prominent keel as in Lufengosaurus, Jingshanosaurus, and other basal sauropodomorphs. Near the back of the neck, the neural spines become somewhat table-like.

The fourteen dorsal vertebrae are weakly amphicoelous, or concave on both ends, typical of basal sauropodomorphs. Also typical is the presence of blade-like keels on the undersides of the first to third dorsal vertebrae, which are not seen elsewhere; additionally, the dorsal vertebrae near the front have the typical low, short, and somewhat plate-like neural spines. Unusually, however, the same kinds of neural spines are also seen in the last three dorsal vertebrae, which is only otherwise seen in basal saurischians like Herrerasaurus and Eoraptor. In the middle and back dorsal vertebrae, the top back corner of the neural spines project outward to produce a concave back edge, which is seen in some other basal sauropodomorphs but not Lufengosaurus, Jingshanosaurus, Yunnanosaurus, and Riojasaurus.

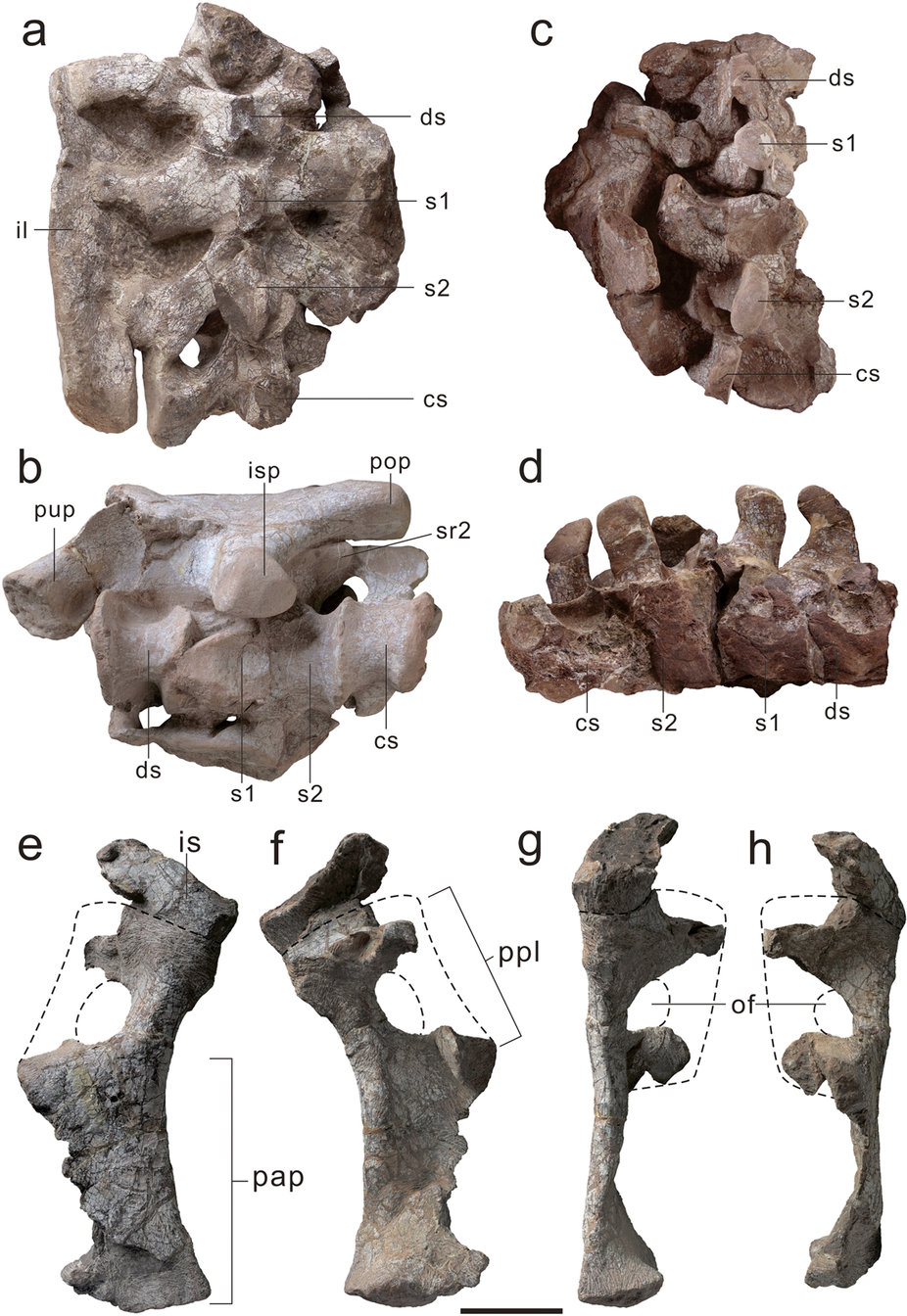
Sacral vertebrae (a-d) and pubis (e-h) of Xingxiulong chengi

Unusually among basal sauropodomorphs, Xingxiulong has four sacral vertebrae. This is a trait typically seen in more derived sauropodomorphs, like Melanorosaurus, Leonerasaurus, Barapasaurus, and Shunosaurus. The first of these sacral vertebrae, the dorsosacral, is not very well-fused to the next sacral vertebra; neither is it entirely fused to the corresponding sacral rib on the transverse processes. Collectively, the dorsosacral and first pair of sacral ribs extend forward to contact the ilium. The second and third sacral vertebrae, the two primordial sacrals, are about the same length, and are well-fused to each other. Like other basal sauropodomorphs, the transverse processes of the third sacral vertebra project backwards and outwards. The same is true of the transverse process and sacral ribs for the fourth sacral vertebra, which contact the ilium again at the back. All of the neural spines are plate-like, like the last few dorsal vertebrae.

It is probable that Xingxiulong would have had more than the 35 preserved caudal vertebrae in the tail. These vertebrae are overall tall and very robust, and have concave sides like other basal sauropodomorphs. They also all appear to be amphicoelous. The transverse processes of the first several caudal vertebrae are wide and flat, and directed upwards and outwards; the transverse processes of caudal vertebrae further back in the tail are more slender and horizontal. As for the neural spines, they are tall and thin, and are directed somewhat backwards.

=== Limbs ===
Both ends of the scapula of Xingxiulong are quite expanded; the bottom end's width is 56% the length of the scapula, and the top end's width is 49% the length of the scapula. Various other basal sauropodomorphs, including Lufengosaurus and Jingshanosaurus, have a more expanded bottom end, but their scapulae are generally more slender; conversely, Antetonitrus and Lessemsaurus have similarly robust scapulae, but the top end is more expanded in these two taxa. As with Jingshanosaurus, the maximum width of the robust shaft of the scapula is 19-20% the length of the overall bone; Antetonitrus and Lessemsaurus have even more robust shafts, while the majority of basal sauropodomorphs have narrower shafts.

The tuberosity on the inner surface of the top end of the humerus is rather poorly-developed in Xingxiulong, in contrast to the majority of basal sauropodomorphs (including Lufengosaurus and Yunnanosaurus). Like Yunnanosaurus and Jingshanosaurus, the ulna is about 61% the length of the humerus; this ratio is 68% in Lufengosaurus, resulting in a longer ulna. The top end of the ulna is quite expanded, with prominent anteromedial and anterolateral processes; these processes, along with the shallow radial fossa, collectively form the articulation of the ulna with the radius. The latter bone is slender and about 54% the length of the humerus. Parts of the hand, which bore at least four digits, are known but not well-described.

Overall, the ilium is similar to other basal sauropodomorphs. The front of the ilium does not exceed the level of the pubic peduncle, or its articulation with the pubis. Unlike other basal sauropodomorphs, the back end is somewhat square instead of being pointed, and the bottom portion is very concave when viewed from the side (in other basal sauropodomorphs, it is mostly straight or even convex). The ischial peduncle, or the portion that articulates with the ischium, has a small projecting heel on its bottom end. As for the pubis itself, the top end (known as the pubic plate) is relatively long, at 40% of the length of the bone, and the bottom portion (known as the pubic apron) is conversely relatively short. This is unlike other basal sauropodomorphs but similar to some basal sauropods. The outer face of the pubic apron is somewhat concave, and the bottom end is expanded forwards and backwards to about 16% the length of the entire bone. Finally, the expanded obturator plate of the ischium bears a groove on its side.

On the femur, the lesser trochanter extends below the level of the femoral head, unlike Yunnanosaurus and Jingshanosaurus. Viewed from the front, the trochanter is close to the midline of the bone, like other basal sauropodomorphs except for Antetonitrus and Melanorosaurus (in which it is closer to the outer edge). Similarly, the fourth trochanter is near the midline, in contrast to many basal sauropodomorphs, including Lufengosaurus. Of the two processes on the bottom of the tibia, the one in the back is thinner, and projects more outwards than downwards than the one in front; this differs from most other sauropodomorphs in which the two are equally thick, and either they project equally outwards (as in Lufengosaurus and Jingshanosaurus) or the front one projects further outwards (as in Yunnanosaurus).

The back of the astragalus bears a bulge close to the bottom end of the bone. A similar bulge is also seen in Mussaurus, albeit better developed and placed closer to the midline. Out of the metatarsals, the first one is the widest and most robust. The fifth metatarsal is unusually expanded at its top end, the width of which is 85% the length of the entire bone. In other sauropodomorphs, this figure is usually 50-77%, although Antetonitrus may have a similarly expanded metatarsal. Below the metatarsals, the five digits have a phalangeal formula of 2-3-4-5-1.

== Classification ==
A 2017 phylogenetic analysis conducted based on the dataset of McPhee et al., published in 2015 with the description of Pulanesaura, found that Xingxiulong was a basal member of the group Sauropodiformes once Blikanasaurus was removed from the dataset. Within this group, it is closest to the contemporary Jingshanosaurus. Traits that are shared by Xingxiulong and Jingshanosaurus include the infratemporal fenestra being placed entirely behind the eye socket; the scapula being at least 20% as wide as it is long; the pubic apron, or the bottom of the pubis, having a concave outer face; the expansion at the bottom of the apron being at least 15% the length of the entire bone; and the angle between the femoral head and the cross-sectional axis of the femoral shaft being about 30°. The topology recovered by this analysis is reproduced below.

- Massopoda
  - - Riojasaurus
    - Eucnemesaurus
  - - Massospondylidae
    - Sauropodiformes
      - Yunnanosaurus
      - - - Jingshanosaurus
          - Xingxiulong
        - - Anchisaurus
          - Mussaurus
          - - Aardonyx
            - - Melanorosaurus
              - - - Lessemsaurus
                  - Antetonitrus
                - - Leonerasaurus
                  - Sauropoda

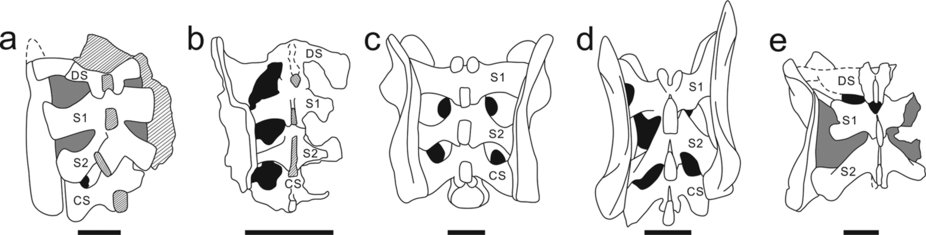
Sacrum of Xingxiulong chengi (a) compared with Leonerasaurus (b), Plateosaurus engelhardti (c), P. trossingensis (d), and Efraasia

Various alternative phylogenetic placements of Xingxiulong were tested; out of these, the most plausible alternative involves it being placed as a basal member of the Massopoda, outside of either Massospondylidae or Sauropodiformes, which only requires two additional evolutionary steps. This is probably due to the curved top margin of the postorbital and the presence of a process behind the jaw joint on the articular, which are traits that, compared to either Massospondylidae or Sauropodiformes, can be regarded as relatively primitive. Such an alternative scenario would involve significant mosaic evolution in this evolutionary grade. Placements that required three additional evolutionary steps placed Xingxiulong between Jingshanosaurus and Anchisaurus, or between Yunnanosaurus and Jingshanosaurus.

Curiously, Xingxiulong has many characteristics that are normally otherwise seen among the Sauropoda. These include the four-vertebra sacrum (which Mussaurus also convergently acquired); the long pubic plate, or top portion of the pubis, which occupies 40% of the length of the bone (this figure is 25% in most other basal sauropodomorphs, 33% in most sauropods, and 45-50% in the Camarasauromorpha); and the relative robustness of the femoral shaft, first metatarsal, top end of the fifth metatarsal, and scapula. These unique characteristics are probably the product of convergent evolution rather than common ancestry.

In their 2025 description of X. yueorum, Chen et al. tested the phylogenetic position of this second species. They recovered Xingxiulong as a monophyletic genus outside of the Sauropodiformes. Both species possess a sacrum with four sacral vertebrae, a robust scapula with greatly expanded proximal and distal ends, an ilium with a strongly concave ventral margin of postacetabular process, and the absence of an astragalar pyramidal dorsal process. The results of their reduced consensus analyses are displayed in the cladogram below:

- Massopoda
  - - Unaysaurus
    - - Macrocollum
      - Pradhania
  - - - Eucnemesaurus spp.
      - Riojasaurus
    - - Sarahsaurus
      - - Massospondylidae
        - - Yunnanosaurus huangi
          - - Jingshanosaurus
            - - Xingxiulong chengi
              - Xingxiulong yueorum
            - - Anchisaurus
              - Sauropodiformes

== Paleobiology ==
The overall robustness of the skeleton of Xingxiulong, especially in the hip, femur, and foot, are convergent upon sauropods, and collectively suggest that it had a relatively large gut and overall high body mass. However, unlike sauropods, Xingxiulong would have been bipedal; it lacks sauropodan adaptations to quadrupedalism including relatively longer forelimbs, the ulna bearing a prominent process on the front of its side, and the femur having a relatively straight shaft. Instead, its ulna and femur are overall more reminiscent of the typical basal sauropodomorph. The large and robust scapulae of Xingxiulong, Jingshanosaurus, and Yunnanosaurus may have increased the mobility of the forelimb during bipedal browsing, but this trait was later adopted as an adaptation to quadrupedality in sauropods.

== Paleoecology ==
The Lufeng Formation contains mudstones and siltstones from lakes, rivers, and overbank deposits.

Many sauropodomorphs aside from Xingxiulong are known from the Lufeng Formation, including Lufengosaurus huenei, L. magnus, Yunnanosaurus huangi, "Gyposaurus" sinensis, Jingshanosaurus xinwaensis, Chuxiongosaurus lufengensis, Xixiposaurus suni, Yizhousaurus sunae, and Pachysuchus imperfectus. Also present are the theropods Sinosaurus triassicus, Lukousaurus yini, Shidaisaurus jinae, and Eshanosaurus deguchiianus; the ornithischians Tatisaurus oehleri and Bienosaurus lufengensis; the crocodylomorphs Dibothrosuchus elaphros, Platyognathus hsui, Microchampsa scutata, and Dianosuchus changchiawaensis, and Dianchungosaurus lufengensis; the indeterminate archosaur Strigosuchus licinus; the sphenodontians Clevosaurus petilus, C. wangi, and C. mcgilli; the tritylodontid cynodonts Bienotherium yunnanense, B. minor, B. magnum, Lufengia deltcata, Yunnanodon brevirostre, and Dianzhongia longirostrata; the mammals Sinoconodon rigneyi, Morganucodon oehleri, M. heikoupengensis, and Kunminia minima; proganochelyid turtles; and a "labyrinthodont" amphibian.

== See also ==
- 2017 in archosaur paleontology
