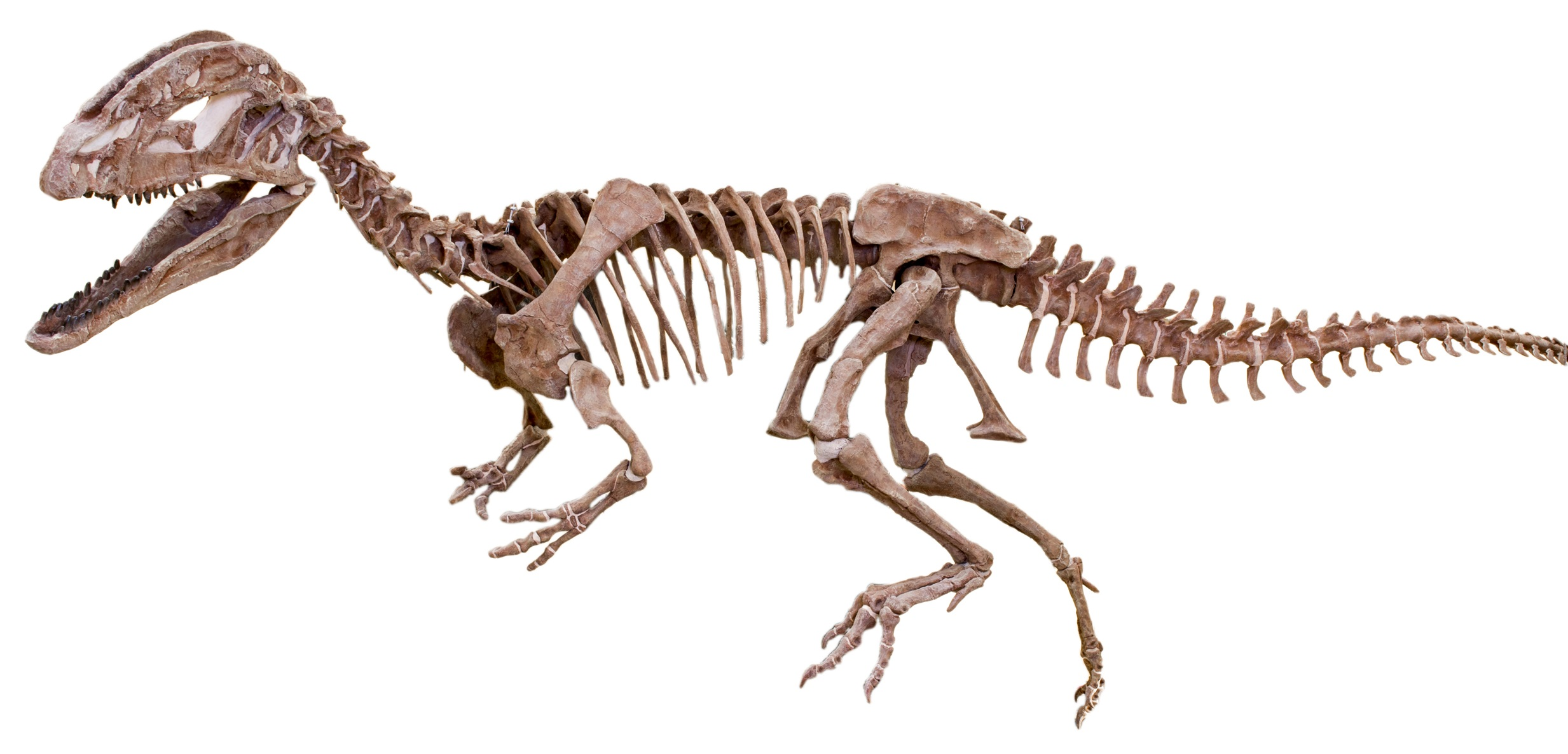
- Reconstructed skeleton at Museo delle Scienze of Trento, Italy

Scientific classification
- Kingdom: Animalia
- Phylum: Chordata
- Class: Reptilia
- Clade: Dinosauria
- Clade: Saurischia
- Clade: Theropoda
- Clade: Averostriformes
- Genus: †Sinosaurus; Young, 1940

Type species
- †Sinosaurus triassicus Young, 1940

Other species
- †?S. sinensis (Hu, 1993)

Synonyms
- Dilophosaurus sinensis Hu, 1993; Shuangbaisaurus anlongbaoensis? Wang, 2017

= Sinosaurus =

Sinosaurus Temporal range: Early Jurassic, 201–196 Ma

Genus of dinosaurs

Sinosaurus (meaning "Chinese lizard") is an extinct genus of basal theropod dinosaur which lived during the Early Jurassic (Hettangian-Sinemurian). Fossils of the animal have been found in the Lufeng Formation, in the Yunnan Province of China. The type species, S. triassicus, was named by Chung Chieng Young in 1940. A second species, S. sinensis, was originally assigned to Dilophosaurus, but was later reassigned to Sinosaurus. Sinosaurus is morphologically similar to Dilophosaurus including the presence of a similarly shaped cranial crest, though its precise taxonomic position is uncertain, and the two genera may not be closely related.

== Discovery and naming ==
The composite term Sinosaurus comes from Sinae, the Latin word for the Chinese, and the Greek word sauros (σαυρος) meaning "lizard"; thus "Chinese lizard". The specific name, triassicus, refers to the Triassic, the period that the fossils were originally thought to date from. Sinosaurus was described and named by Chung Chien Young, who is known as the 'Father of Chinese Vertebrate Paleontology', in 1940.

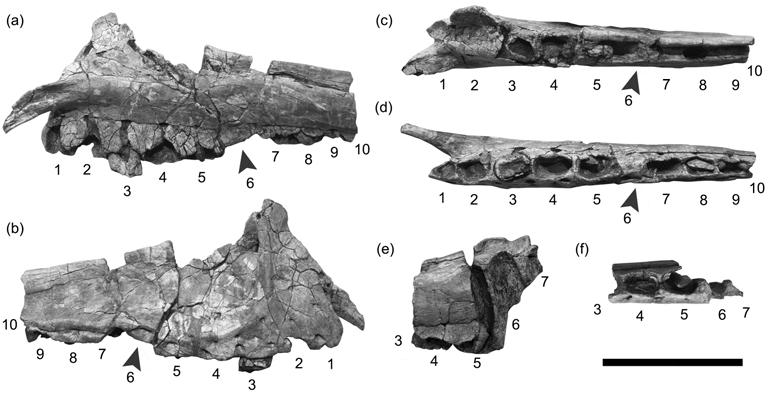
Maxilla of specimen ZLJT01

The holotype, IVPP V34, was found in the Lower Lufeng Formation, and consists of two maxillary (upper jaw) fragments, four maxillary teeth, and a lower jaw fragment with three teeth. The teeth are laterally compressed, and feature fine serrations both at their anterior and posterior edges. The teeth are also variable in size and are curved backwards. This material is too fragmentary to determine the length and weight of this dinosaur. Over the years, other fossils were referred to Sinosaurus, some of which were material that was shown to belong to two sauropodomorphs. The fossils include postcrania, with a sacrum with three preserved sacral vertebrae. The material assigned to "Sinosaurus postcrania" includes a mix of plateosaurid and melanorosaurid elements. All the material from the Red Beds block has now been reassigned to Jingshanosaurus.

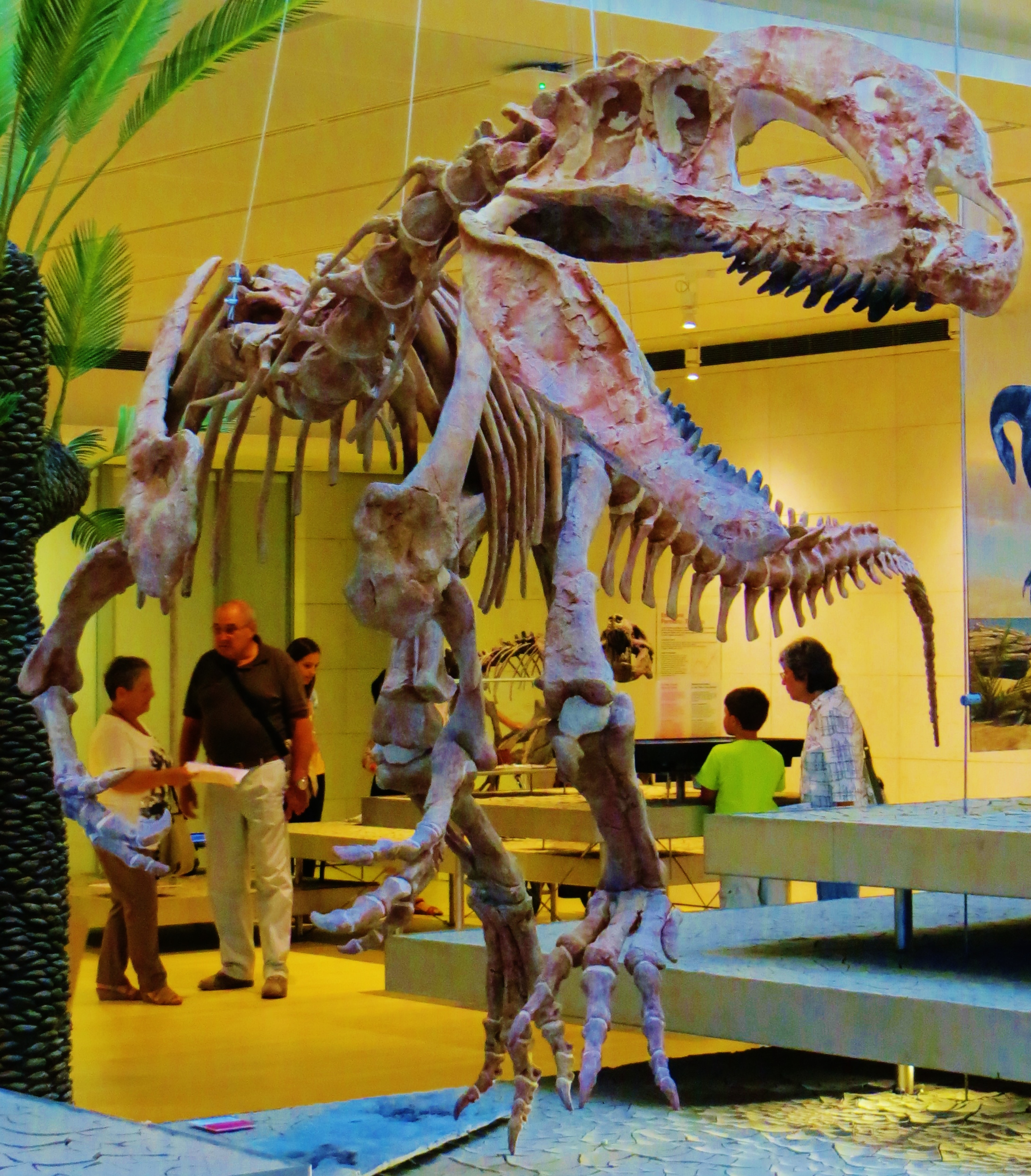
Frontal view of mounted skeleton cast.

KMV 8701 was originally discovered in 1987. The specimen was identified as a new species, and was named Dilophosaurus sinensis. Then in 1994, during a field expedition, a more complete specimen was found, and was assigned to the same species. In 2003, Dong Zhiming studied the material of Sinosaurus triassicus, finding it to be quite similar to Dilophosaurus sinensis. As Sinosaurus was named earlier, "Dilophosaurus" sinensis became its junior synonym. In 2013, a study by Currie et al., confirmed that D. sinensis was the same animal as S. triassicus On the other hand, Wang et al. (2017) stated that it needs to be further investigated whether D. sinensis is indeed a junior synonym of S. triassicus, and noted that the two species are different at least in the anatomy of the premaxilla. The authors tentatively assigned D. sinensis to the genus Sinosaurus, but retained it as a species distinct from Sinosaurus triassicus. Specimen KMV 8701 consists of a skull, measuring 52.5 cm (20.7 in), and is nearly complete. Dong claimed that animal was about 5.6 m (18 ft) long. It has been assigned now to Sinosaurus, but the specimen still lacks sufficient description and preparation.

Over the years, paleontologists referred additional specimens to D. sinensis which are now assigned to Sinosaurus. Dong (2003) referred specimen LDM-LCA10 which consists of a skull and an incomplete skeleton. In 2012, Xing referred two individuals, ZLJ0003 which consists of a partial skull and an incomplete skeleton, and ZLJT01 which is a juvenile individual that consists of a premaxillary fragment, an incomplete maxilla, a maxillary fragment, a lacrimal, both frontals, both parietals, an incomplete braincase, an incomplete dentary, an atlantal intercentrum, two dorsal rib fragments, and a partial proximal caudal neural arch, to Sinosaurus.

In 2012, a new specimen of Sinosaurus was described, and was found to represent a new species. The species Shuangbaisaurus anlongbaoensis, discovered and named in 2017, has later been considered a synonym of Sinosaurus triassicus. A complete skull with a preserved mandible and 11 cervical vertebrae was described for Sinosaurus in 2023, after it was discovered near the locality where the holotype was found. The specimen also suggests three autapomorphies are unique to this theropod, all regarding crest development and the various fenestrae of the skull.

== Description ==
=== Size ===
Sinosaurus was a relatively large theropod by the standards of the Early Jurassic. With the use of virtual skeletal mount, Liang et al. (2024) estimated that Sinosaurus was a large theropod around 5.85 metres (19.2 ft) long with a maximum body mass of 895 kilograms (1,973 lb). The authors suggested that since the phylogenetic position of Sinosaurus is not well understood, previous estimations based on extant scaling approaches derived from femur length and circumference are unreliable.

=== Skull ===
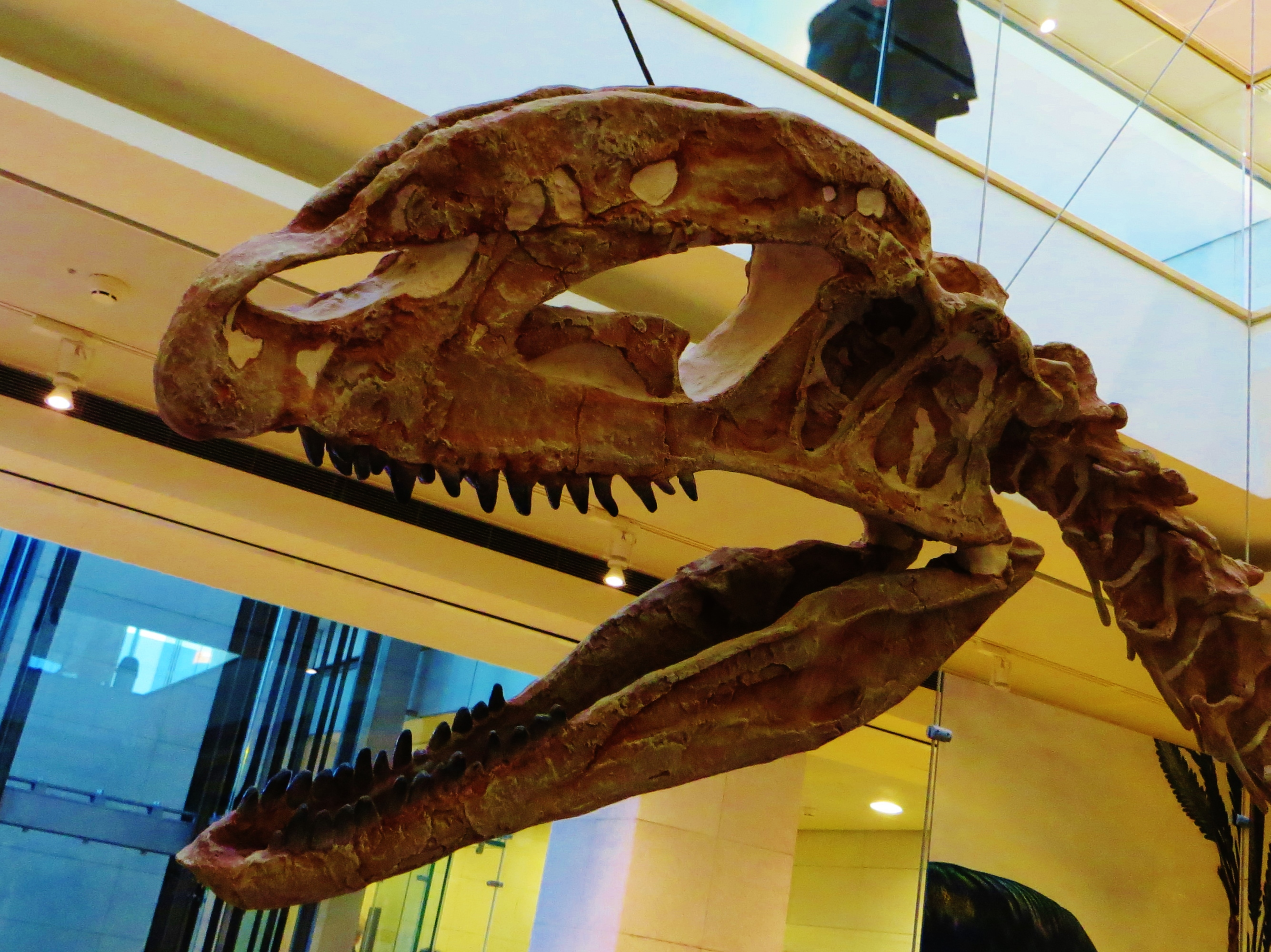
Skull of Sinosaurus triassicus, showing the many fenestrae of the skull

A near- complete Sinosaurus triassicus skull (LFKL 004), measured from the anterior (front) end of the premaxilla to the posterior (rear) end of the quadratojugal, has a total length of 51.96 cm (20.46 in), and is similar in size to that of Dilophosaurus. The ratio between the height and length of the skull is intermediate between that of Dilophosaurus and that of later theropods, such as Allosaurus. The most distinctive feature is a pair of large crests over the antorbital fenestra, formed from the nasal and lacrimal bones, which superficially resemble those of Dilophosaurus. The posterior end of the crest, the part formed by the lacrimal, is axe-shaped. Eight major fenestrae are littered throughout the skull, including the nasal cavity (nostril) and the orbit (eye socket). The lacrimal extends to the edge of the antorbital fenestra, and projects into the posterodorsal (rear back) part of the antorbital fossa. There is a small gap between the premaxilla and maxilla, the subnarial gap, which is also seen in several basal theropods, like Dilophosaurus and coelophysoids. The two species of Sinosaurus can be distinguished by the amount of teeth on the premaxilla (S. triassicus has four, while S. sinensis has five), and the fact that S. sinensis lacks one of the aforementioned fenestrae, that on the lateral surface of the crest.

Sinosaurus is the only "dilophosaurid" known from a complete braincase. Cryolophosaurus, Dilophosaurus, Zupaysaurus and Coelophysis kayentakatae are all known from partial braincases. Two partial braincases were found before 2012, and are probably mostly complete, except that large sections are obscured by sediments. In 2011, an exceptionally well-preserved braincase was found, only missing the frontal bones and orbitosphenoid.

=== Postcranial skeleton ===
With the reclassification of most of Sinosaurus' postcrania to other genera, what little data there is comes from specimens, such as ZLJ 0003 and ZLJ 0057. Both specimens are almost complete, though their postcranial elements have not yet been described in detail.

== Classification ==
Originally thought to be a coelophysoid related to Dilophosaurus and Cryolophosaurus, Oliver Rauhut in 2003 showed Sinosaurus to be a more advanced theropod, related to Cryolophosaurus and "Dilophosaurus" sinensis. In 2013, in an unpublished work, Carano agreed that Sinosaurus is a theropod. Sinosaurus has been considered a nomen dubium in a few works, although now that "Dilophosaurus" sinensis is referred to it, it is considered valid.

Dilophosaurus sinensis was shown to be a junior synonym of Sinosaurus in 2003. It is possibly closer to the Antarctic theropod Cryolophosaurus, based on the fact that the anterior end of the jugal does not participate in the internal antorbital fenestra and that the maxillary tooth row is completely in front of the eye socket. D. sinensis was exhibited in 1998 at Dinofest in Philadelphia. Although the skull of D. sinensis sports large nasolacrimal crests superficially like those reconstructed in D. wetherilli, features elsewhere in the skeleton suggest it is closer to tetanuran theropods. Rauhut (2003) regarded D. sinensis as a basal tetanuran most closely related to Sinosaurus and Cryolophosaurus. Lamanna et al. (1998b) examined the material ascribed to D. sinensis and found it to be synonymous with Sinosaurus triassicus. This cladistic finding was confirmed in 2003 by Dong.

The Lufeng Dinosaurian Museum discovered a new specimen of Sinosaurus (ZLJT01) in 2007 from the Lufeng Basin. It consists of an incomplete skull and other postcranial fragments. Phylogenetic analysis of this specimen, demonstrates that Sinosaurus is a more derived theropod, and is not the most basal dilophosaurid, as held by Smith et al. A cladogram was identified by Christophe Hendrickx and Octávio Mateus. It placed Sinosaurus and Cryolophosaurus in a polytomy at the base of Tetanurae.

- Theropoda
  - Eoraptor
  - - Herrerasaurus
    - - Coelophysoidea
        - Dilophosaurus
        - - Coelophysis bauri
          - Coelophysis rhodesiensis
      - - Ceratosauria
          - Elaphrosaurus
          - - Ceratosaurus
            - Abelisauroidea
              - Majungasaurus
              - Masiakasaurus
        - Tetanurae
          - Cryolophosaurus
          - Sinosaurus
          - - Chuandongocoelurus
            - Monolophosaurus
            - Orionides
              - Megalosauroidea
              - Avetheropoda

Recent studies placed Sinosaurus outside the Ceratosauria+Tetanurae clade, while Wang et al. (2016) considered it the basalmost ceratosaur.

== Paleobiology ==
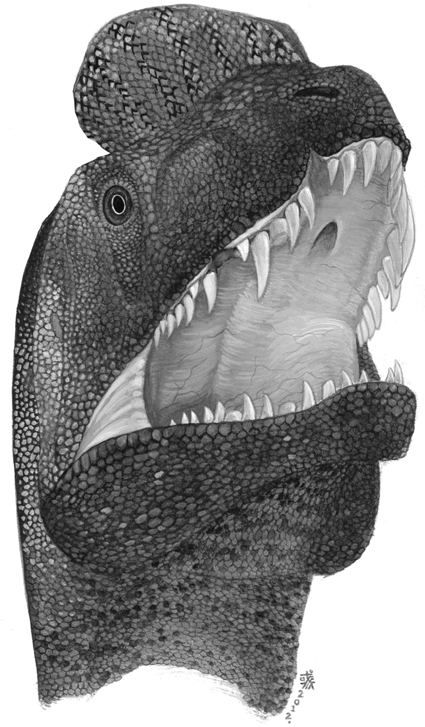
Restoration showing dental abnormality based on ZLJT01.

=== Crest function ===
Sinosaurus and Dilophosaurus both possess dual crests. However, it was found that the crests could not be used in combat.

=== Feeding ===
The skull of Sinosaurus has a deep notch between the premaxilla and maxilla. Dong (2003) proposed that the notch was used to house jaw muscles, giving Sinosaurus a powerful bite. Based on the estimated power of its jaws, Sinosaurus might have either been a carnivore or a scavenger. Dong suspected that the premaxilla was covered in a narrow, hooked beak, that was used to rip open skin and abdominal flesh. He also thought that the crest would have been used to hold open the abdominal cavity while feeding. Dong studied the feet of Sinosaurus as well, finding a resemblance with the feet of modern vultures. The feet of Sinosaurus were probably adapted to help it feed on large-bodied animals, such as prosauropods. The body shape of Sinosaurus combined with its skull/body length ratio further suggests that Sinosaurus was a fast runner, and relied heavily on both its long front limbs and its jaws to take down its prey.

=== Paleopathology ===
A study by Xing et al. (2013) examined the effect of the traumatic loss of teeth on the dental alveolus (the socket in the jaw where the roots of teeth are held) in dinosaurs. Sinosaurus is the first dinosaur where remodeling of the alveolus in the jaw was observed. The authors concluded that this finding "contributes to mounting evidence suggesting theropods were highly resilient to a broad spectrum of traumas and diseases." The dental alveolus found on Sinosaurus is the first documented dental pathology found on a dinosaur.

== Paleoecology ==
=== Provenance and occurrence ===
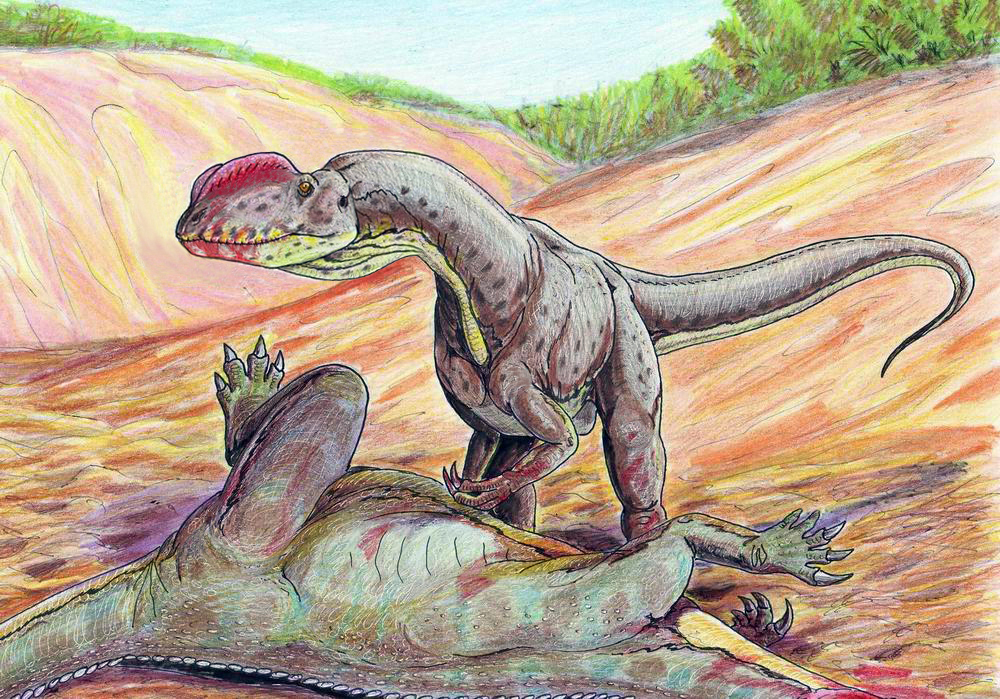
Drawing of a Sinosaurus feeding on a Yunnanosaurus

The type specimen of Sinosaurus triassicus IVPP V34 was recovered in the Zhangjiawa Member of the Lufeng Formation, in Yunnan, China. These remains were discovered at the Dark Red Beds that were deposited during the Sinemurian stage of the Jurassic period, approximately 196-183 million years ago. Several other discoveries referred to Sinosaurus were made in the Zhangjiawa Member: specimens IVPP V97 (postcrania), IVPP V36 (teeth), IVPP 37 (teeth), IVPP V88 (ilium), IVPP V35 (teeth and postcranial bones), IVPP V100 and IVPP V48 (teeth and postcranial bones) discovered in 1938 by M. Bien & C.C. Young, FMNH CUP 2001–2003 discovered by E. Oehler and Hu. Specimens FMNH CUP 2097, FMNH CUP 2098, FMNH CUP 2004, FMNH CUP 2005 were discovered in 1948 by M. Bien & C.C. Young at Zhangjiawa Member, as well. Sinosaurus sp. fossils have been found in the Zhenzhuchong Formation, and were previously thought to be a poposaur, although they might have only been from the equivalent Lufeng Formation.

Specimen IVPP V504, referred to Sinosaurus, a maxilla with four teeth, was collected by Lee in the 1940s, in the Dull Purplish Beds of Shawan Member of the Lufeng Formation, that were deposited during the Hettangian stage of the Jurassic period, approximately 201-199 million years ago. Several other discoveries were made in the Shawan Member: parts of two skeletons attributed to Sinosaurus were discovered by Sou in 1956, specimen IVPP V279 (tooth) was discovered by C.C. Young in 1938, in dark red clayish sandstone, and specimen IVPP V381 (several teeth) was discovered by C.C. Young, in blue mudstone. The D. sinensis remains, KMV 8701, a nearly complete skeleton, now referred to Sinosaurus, were recovered in the Shawan Member of Lufeng Formation. This material was discovered in 1987 in the Dull Purplish Beds that were deposited during the Hettangian stage of the Early Jurassic, approximately 201-199 million years ago.

=== Fauna and habitat ===
In the Lufeng Formation, Sinosaurus shared its paleoenvironment with therapsids like Morganucodon, Oligokyphus, and Bienotherium; archosaurs like Pachysuchus; diapsids like Strigosuchus; crocodylomorphs like Platyognathus and Microchampsa; the early mammal Hadrocodium; and other early reptiles. Contemporary dinosaurs include indeterminate sauropods; the early thyreophorans Bienosaurus lufengensis and Tatisaurus oehleri; the supposed chimeric ornithopod "Dianchungosaurus lufengensis"; the prosauropods Gyposaurus sinensis, Lufengosaurus huenei, L. magnus, Jingshanosaurus xinwaiensis, Kunmingosaurus wudingensis, Chinshakiangosaurus chunghoensis, Yunnanosaurus huangi, "Y." robustus, and an unnamed taxon; and the theropods Lukousaurus, Eshanosaurus, and Coelophysis sp.

Changpeipus footprints have been found in the Lufeng Formation. In 2009, a study led by Li-Da Xing found that footprints from the Lufeng Formation were unique among ichnogenera, and named the footprints Changpeipus pareschequier. The study hypothesized that they were produced by a coelophysoid; there are many possible trackmakers, however, including both Sinosaurus and Coelophysis sp.
