= Shuangbaisaurus =

Shuangbaisaurus Temporal range: ?Hettangian

Scientific classification
- Kingdom: Animalia
- Phylum: Chordata
- Class: Reptilia
- Clade: Dinosauria
- Clade: Saurischia
- Clade: Theropoda
- Genus: †Shuangbaisaurus; Wang et al., 2017

Type species
- †Shuangbaisaurus anlongbaoensis Wang et al., 2017

Extinct genus of dinosaurs

Shuangbaisaurus (meaning "Shuangbai reptile") is genus of theropod dinosaur, possibly a junior synonym of Sinosaurus. It lived in the Early Jurassic of Yunnan Province, China, and is represented by a single species, S. anlongbaoensis, known from a partial skull. Like the theropods Dilophosaurus and Sinosaurus, Shuangbaisaurus bore a pair of thin, midline crests on its skull. Unusually, these crests extended backwards over the level of the eyes, which, along with the unusual orientation of the jugal bone, led the describers to name it as a new genus. However, Shuangbaisaurus also possesses a groove between its premaxilla and maxilla, a characteristic which has been used to characterize Sinosaurus as a genus. Among the two morphotypes present within the genus Sinosaurus, Shuangbaisaurus more closely resembles the morphotype that is variably treated as a distinct species, S. sinensis, in its relatively tall skull.

== Description ==
Shuangbaisaurus had a relatively robust (compared to Sinosaurus) skull, with a length of 54 centimetres (21 in) and a length/height ratio of 2.84, not including the thin paired crests that were present at least above the eye sockets. These crests are incompletely preserved, but appeared to have been formed mostly from the frontal bone, as well as possibly the postorbital and prefrontal bones. The crests may have extended further forward, over the nasal and lacrimal bones. Similar crests are seen in Dilophosaurus and Sinosaurus; however, the crests of Sinosaurus do not extend over the eyes, thus differentiating it from Shuangbaisaurus.

At the tip of the jaw, the premaxilla and maxilla are separated by a groove, which is also a defining characteristic of Sinosaurus. The premaxilla would have been taller than it is long, which is similar to specimen LFGT LDM-L10 of Sinosaurus triassicus but unlike either Dilophosaurus or specimen KMV 8701 of Sinosaurus sinensis. Also like LFGT LDM-L10, the bottom edge of the premaxilla is much higher than the maxilla. The two bones are at the same level in KMV 8701, and are angled away from each other in Dilophosaurus. Similar to both LFGT LDM-L10 and KMV 8701, the maxilla bears a near-vertical front margin; it is lower and more pointed in Dilophosaurus. The front portion of the bottom margin of the maxilla is angled such that the first maxillary tooth projects forwards. There is a groove running parallel to the tooth row along the bottom rim of the maxilla.

From behind, the maxilla is connected to the jugal. The lacrimal is located above their joint, enclosing the fossa that surrounds the antorbital fenestra. There is a ridge directed downwards and backwards on the side of the jugal, like in Zupaysaurus; this same ridge is horizontal in Sinosaurus and Dilophosaurus. The same is also true of the joint between the jugal and quadratojugal. The quadratojugal tapers to a point underneath the infratemporal fenestra, where it is joined at the back to the quadrate. Further above, the lacrimal is joined by the long and slender descending branch of the three-pronged postorbital, which is convex in its upper third. From above, the forward-directed branch of the postorbital is offset from the backward-directed branch, being separated by a small recess. The frontals appeared to have been long and large, forming most of the top of the skull.

The antorbital fenestra of Shuangbaisaurus is large, occupying roughly one third the length of the skull. The back margin of the fenestra slopes backwards, like LFGT LDM-L10 and Dilophosaurus but unlike KMV 8701. Further behind, the orbit is keyhole-shaped, with a longer back rim compared to the front rim. The infratemporal fenestra is roughly trapezoidal, with a long axis oriented upwards and backwards towards the top of the rear of the skull. On the top surface of the skull, the rounded supratemporal fenestra is unusually small, with a diameter equivalent to only about half of the length on the top of the skull behind the level of the orbit.

== Discovery and naming ==
Shuangbaisaurus is known from a single specimen, a partial skull missing most of the top of the snout, stored at the Chuxiong Prefectural Museum in Chuxiong Yi Autonomous Prefecture, Yunnan, China under the specimen number CPM C2140ZA245. Additionally, the front half and back portion of the jaw are also associated with the skull. The specimen's snout has also become bent to the left due to deformation during fossilization. It was discovered in layers of purple muddy siltstone located in Liuna Village, Anlongbao Town, Shuangbai County, Chuxiong Yi, about 100 kilometres (62 mi) south of the well-known Lufeng deposits. These layers have been recognized as belonging to the Early Jurassic Fengjiahe Formation, which has been tentatively dated to the Hettangian.

In 2017, the type and only species of the genus Shuangbaisaurus, S. anlongbaoensis, was formally described and named by Wang Guo-Fu, You Hai-Lu, Pan Shi-Gang, and Wang Tao. The generic name refers to Shuangbai County, and the specific name refers to Anlongbao Town (with Anlongbao literally meaning "dragon-placing fort"), and thus both elements of the binomial name reference its provenance.

In a 2019 conference abstract, Philip Currie and colleagues suggested that CPM C2140ZA245 fell within the range of variation of specimens assigned to Sinosaurus triassicus.

== Classification ==
After Dilophosaurus and Sinosaurus, Shuangbaisaurus is the third large theropod known definitely to have had paired crests on its skull (though the smaller Coelophysis kayentakatae also has similar crests). Shuangbaisaurus seems to generally be similar to the roughly contemporaneous Sinosaurus. However, they are notably differentiated in that the crests clearly extend over the orbit in Shuangbaisaurus, whereas they are restricted to extensions of the nasal and lacrimal that do not reach past the orbit in Sinosaurus. Similarly, the backward and downward orientation of the jugal is a trait of Shuangbaisaurus not seen in Sinosaurus, where it is horizontal. However, the vertical groove separating the premaxilla and maxilla, which seems to be present in Shuangbaisaurus, was denoted as a distinguishing characteristic of Sinosaurus by Matthew Carrano and colleagues in 2012, thus complicating its referral to a new genus by Wang et al.

A further issue in the relation between Shuangbaisaurus and Sinosaurus involves the taxonomic convolution that has befallen Sinosaurus. At least one species is recognized in the genus, Sinosaurus triassicus, consisting of specimens LFGT LDM-L10 and LFGT ZLJT01; another specimen, KMV 8701, originally named "Dilophosaurus" sinensis, has been referred to either S. triassicus or a second species S. sinensis. KMV 8701 approaches Shuangbaisaurus more closely in its tall skull and premaxilla than specimens referred to S. triassicus. Wang et al. elected to retain S. sinensis as a separate species owing to these differences.

In 2025, Hongqing Li and colleagues described specimen LZ0895, a theropod dinosaur from the Lufeng Formation that is distinct from both Sinosaurus and Shuangbaisaurus. Their phylogenetic analysis found that Shuangbaisaurus is most closely related to Sinosaurus and Dilophosaurus.

== Paleoecology ==
Aside from Shuangbaisaurus, several sauropodomorph dinosaurs originate from the Fengjiahe Formation. These include Chinshakiangosaurus chunghoensis (a possible sauropod), Lufengosaurus sp., Yimenosaurus youngi, and Yunnanosaurus huangi (a juvenile specimen, which was also discovered in Shuangbai County). Ostracods of the genus Darwinula have also been found. A diverse ichnofauna is also known from deposits of the Fengjiahe Formation, including the ichnotaxa Eubrontes platypus, Grallator limnosus, Paracoelurosaurichnus monax, Schizograllator xiaohebaensis, Youngichnus xiyangensis, and Zhengichnus jinningensis (with the last four sometimes considered synonymous with Grallator).

Temporally, the Fengjiahe Formation is equivalent to the Lower Lufeng Formation, from where Sinosaurus is known alongside a diverse assemblage consisting of another theropod, Lukousaurus; sauropodmorphs (including Chinshakiangosaurus sp., Lufengosaurus huenei, L. magnus, Xingxiulong chengi and Yunnanosaurus huangi); ornithischians; crocodylomorphs; cynodonts and mammals; turtles; amphibians; and bivalves.

== See also ==
- 2017 in archosaur paleontology
