= Fengjiahe Formation =

Geological formation in Yunnan, China

- Stratigraphic range: Pliensbachian
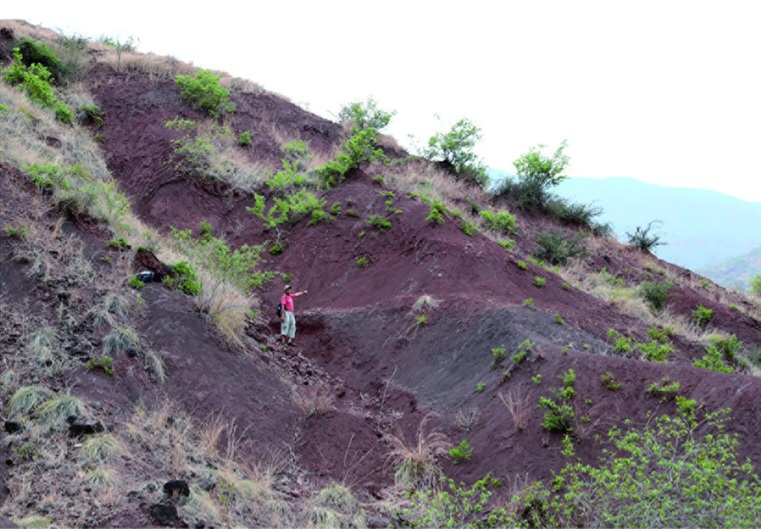
- Outcrop of the Fengjiahe Formation in a quarry which is also the type locality of Yuxisaurus kopchicki
- Type: Geological formation
- Underlies: Zhanghe Formation
- Overlies: Shezi Formation
- Thickness: Up to 1,500 m (4,900 ft)

Lithology
- Primary: Mudstone, siltstone
- Other: Sandstone

Location
- Coordinates: 24.7°N 101.6°E
- Approximate paleocoordinates: 32.7°N 99.8°E
- Region: Yunnan
- Country: China
- Extent: Yimen Basin
- Fengjiahe Formation (China) Fengjiahe Formation (Yunnan)

The Fengjiahe Formation is a geological formation in China. It dates back to the Early Jurassic, most likely to the Pliensbachian. The formation is up to 1500 metres thick and consists of "purple-red mudstone and argillaceous siltstone interbedded with gray-green and yellow-green quartz sandstone and feldspathic quartz sandstone"

== Fossil content ==
=== Dinosaurs ===
Theropod tracks geographically present in Yunnan, China.

Color key: Taxon / Reclassified taxon / Taxon falsely reported as present / Dubious taxon or junior synonym / Ichnotaxon / Ootaxon / Morphotaxon	Notes; Uncertain or tentative taxa are in small text; ~~crossed out~~ taxa are discredited.

Dinosaurs of the Fengjiahe Formation
Genus	Species	Location	Stratigraphic position	Material	Notes	Images
Anomoepus	A. isp.	Xiyang	Upper Member	Footprint	Ornithischian tracks	
Shuangbaisaurus	S. anlongbaoensis	Shuangbai County	Lower part of formation	Partial skull with lower jaw	A crested basal theropod, probably a junior synonym of Sinosaurus	
Chinshakiangosaurus	C. chunghoensis	Geographically present in Yunnan, China.			A basal sauropod	
Eubrontes	E. (Paracoelurosaurichnus) monax	Xiyang	Upper Member	Footprints	Theropod tracks	
Eubrontes	E. platypus	Xiyang	Upper Member	Footprints	Theropod tracks	
Eubrontes	E. (Youngichnus) xiyangensis	Xiyang	Upper Member	Footprints	Theropod tracks	
Grallator	G. limnosus	Xiyang	Upper Member	Footprints	Theropod tracks	
Grallator	G. isp.	Mouding County		Footprints	Theropod tracks	
Grallator	G. isp.	Xiyang	Upper Member	Footprint	Theropod tracks	
Irisosaurus	I. yimenensis				A sauropodiform sauropomorph	
Lufengosaurus	L. huenei				A massospondylid sauropodomorph	
Kayentapus	K. (Schizograllator) xiaohebaensis	Xiyang	Upper Member	Footprint	Theropod tracks	
Kayentapus	K. isp.	Xiyang	Upper Member	Footprint	Theropod tracks	
Theropoda indet.	Indeterminate	Mouding County		A single tooth.	A tetenuran theropod with allosauroid affinites. A theropod distinct from Sinosaurus.	
Theropoda indet.	Indeterminate	Mouding County		Footprint	Footprints are medium-to-large sized. Resembles Kayentapus	
Xiangyunloong	X. fengming	Geographically present in Yunnan, China.		"A partial skeleton including three cervical, five dorsal and 15 caudal vertebrae, several dorsal rib fragments, nearly a dozen chevrons, an incomplete left ilium, and a right ischium."	A massopodan sauropodomorph	
Yimenosaurus	Y. youngi	Geographically present in Yunnan, China.		"[Ten] partial skeletons, skull, adult."	A plateosaurid sauropodomorph	
Yunnanosaurus	Y. youngi				A sauropodiform sauropodomorph	
Yuxisaurus	Y. kopchicki	Yuxi Prefecture, Yunnan, China	Upper	Partial skeleton including a partial skull, cervical and dorsal vertebrae, scapulae, right humerus, left femur, and osteoderms	A basal thyreophoran	
Zhengichnus	Z. jinningensis	Xiyang	Upper Member	Footprints	Theropod tracks	

== See also ==
- List of dinosaur-bearing rock formations
