= Xixiposaurus =

Xixiposaurus Temporal range: Early Jurassic, 201–183 Ma

Scientific classification
- Kingdom: Animalia
- Phylum: Chordata
- Class: Reptilia
- Clade: Dinosauria
- Clade: Saurischia
- Clade: †Sauropodomorpha
- Genus: †Xixiposaurus; Sekiya, 2010
- Species: †X. suni

Binomial name
- †Xixiposaurus suni Sekiya, 2010

Extinct genus of dinosaurs

Xixiposaurus (meaning "Xixipo lizard") is a genus of sauropodomorph dinosaur which existed in what is now Lower Lufeng Formation, China during the lower Jurassic period. It was first named by Sekiya Toru in 2010 and the type species is X. suni.

== Etymology ==
The generic name, Xixiposaurus, refers to the village of Xixipo in Lufeng County, Yunnan, China, where the holotype, a partial skeleton with skull named ZLJ01018, was discovered. The specific name, suni, refers to Professor Sun Ge of Jilin University.

== Classification ==
Sekiya (2010)'s phylogenetic analysis places Xixiposaurus as a derived member of a monophyletic Prosauropoda, a hypothesis that is currently unaccepted. It is placed as the sister taxon to Mussaurus in a family Plateosauridae, which also included Riojasaurus, Coloradisaurus, and "Gyposaurus" sinensis.
