= Pachysuchus =

Pachysuchus Temporal range: Early Jurassic, 196.5–189.6 Ma

Scientific classification
- Kingdom: Animalia
- Phylum: Chordata
- Class: Reptilia
- Clade: Dinosauria
- Clade: Saurischia
- Clade: †Sauropodomorpha
- Genus: †Pachysuchus; Young, 1951

Type species
- †Pachysuchus imperfectus Young, 1951

Extinct genus of dinosaurs

Pachysuchus is a dubious extinct genus of basal sauropodomorph dinosaur from the Early Jurassic of China.

== Description ==
Pachysuchus is known from a poorly preserved partial rostrum that was described from the Lower Lufeng Series in Yunnan by paleontologist Yang Zhongjian ("C.C. Young") in 1951. The type species is Pachysuchus imperfectus. The generic name translates as "thick crocodile"; the specific name means "imperfect" in Latin. Young identified the rostrum as that of a phytosaur, a long-snouted crocodile-like crurotarsan. Phytosaurs were common in the Triassic, but none are otherwise known from the Jurassic. They are thought to have gone extinct during the Triassic-Jurassic extinction event. The rostrum from which Young described the specimen had since been lost, and his first description of the genus had been questioned. The poor preservation of the specimen and its presence in Jurassic beds makes it doubtful that Pachysuchus is a phytosaur. Paul M. Barrett and Xu Xing (2012) relocated the holotype of P. imperfectus, specimen IVPP V 40, and identified it as actually belonging to a taxonomically indeterminate basal sauropodomorph. According to Barrett and Xu, the holotype of Pachysuchus "does not bear any unique features or a unique character combination"; it differs from rostra of other Early Jurassic Chinese sauropodomorphs, but it cannot be ruled out that the differences are caused by its poor preservation, making it a nomen dubium.
