= Kunminia =

Kunminia Temporal range: Sinemurian ~196.5–189.6 Ma

Scientific classification
- Domain: Eukaryota
- Kingdom: Animalia
- Phylum: Chordata
- Clade: Synapsida
- Clade: Therapsida
- Clade: Cynodontia
- Family: incertae sedis
- Genus: †Kunminia; Young, 1947

Type species
- Kunminia minima Young, 1947

Extinct genus of cynodonts

Kunminia is a genus of cynodont synapsids from the Early Jurassic (Sinemurian) Lufeng Formation of China.
