= Fulengia =

Fulengia Temporal range: Early Jurassic, 199–183 Ma

Scientific classification
- Kingdom: Animalia
- Phylum: Chordata
- Class: Reptilia
- Clade: Dinosauria
- Clade: Saurischia
- Clade: †Sauropodomorpha
- Clade: †Massopoda
- Genus: †Fulengia; Carroll and Galton, 1977
- Species: †F. youngi

Binomial name
- †Fulengia youngi Carroll and Galton, 1977

Extinct genus of dinosaurs

Fulengia is a dubious genus of basal sauropodomorph dinosaur from the Early Jurassic Lufeng Formation of China. The type species, F. youngi, was described by Carroll and Galton in 1977. It is a nomen dubium and may be the same animal as Lufengosaurus (from which it is anagramized). It was originally thought to be a lizard.

== History ==
The holotype of Fulengia (CUP 2037), a mineralised lump containing a small skull, just under 4 centimetres (1.6 in) long, a single vertebra, and a jumble of unidentifiable bones, was originally catalogued as a juvenile specimen of Yunnanosaurus huangi by Simmons in 1965, who reckoned they were "coprolitic in origin", but there is no way to accurately prove this. Twelve years later Carroll and Galton reclassified it as a lizard of Late Triassic age and named the species Fulengia youngi.

The holotype remains, and two other nodules (CUP 2038a and CUP 2038b) from the same site were also found during reinspection of the Catholic University of Peking collections in 1989. In 1989, Evans and Milner classified Fulengia as an Early Jurassic sauropodomorph.

== Description ==
It was around 6.2 metres (20 ft) long and around 600 kilograms (1,300 lb) in weight when fully grown. Its height was unknown, and it had a skull size of around 4 centimetres (1.6 in) long.
