= Dianosuchus =

Dianosuchus Temporal range: Early Jurassic, 197–190 Ma

Scientific classification
- Kingdom: Animalia
- Phylum: Chordata
- Class: Reptilia
- Clade: Pseudosuchia
- Clade: Crocodylomorpha
- Family: †Protosuchidae
- Genus: †Dianosuchus; Young, 1982
- Species: †D. changchiawaensis

Binomial name
- †Dianosuchus changchiawaensis Young, 1982

Extinct genus of reptiles

Dianosuchus is an extinct genus of protosuchid crocodyliform. Fossils have been found from the Dark Red Beds of the Lower Lufeng Formation in Yunnan, China, dating back to the Sinemurian stage of the Early Jurassic. It is characterized by an unusually flattened snout compared to other protosuchians, conical isodont teeth that lacked striations, and very small antorbital fenestrae.
