= Dianchungosaurus =

Dianchungosaurus Temporal range: Early Jurassic, 195.5–189.6 Ma

Scientific classification
- Kingdom: Animalia
- Phylum: Chordata
- Class: Reptilia
- Clade: Pseudosuchia
- Clade: Crocodylomorpha
- Genus: †Dianchungosaurus; Young, 1982
- Species: †D. lufengensis

Binomial name
- †Dianchungosaurus lufengensis Young, 1982

Synonyms
- Dianchungosaurus elegans Zhao, 1986; Tianchungosaurus Young, 1982

Extinct genus of reptiles

Dianchungosaurus (meaning "Dianchung lizard") is an extinct genus of mesoeucrocodylian crocodyliform from the Early Jurassic of China. It was previously considered a dinosaur, but it was recently reclassified as a mesoeucrocodylian by Paul Barrett and Xing Xu (2005). It is probably the same animal as the informally named "Tianchungosaurus". The type species is D. lufengensis and it was described in 1982. A second species, D. elegans, was named in 1986, but it has since become a synonym of the type species.

== Material ==
Two specimens were originally referred to this taxon:

- IVPP V4735a (holotype): an isolated premaxilla.
- IVPP V4735b (paratype): cojoined partial left and right dentaries with teeth and left splenial

Both remains come from the Lower Lufeng Formation, near Dianchung, in the Yunnan Province in China. The age of the material is thus Sinemurian (Early Jurassic).

== Systematics ==
Originally classified by Young in 1982 in Heterodontosauridae, Dianchungosaurus lufengensis' affinities were doubted by some, who regarded it as a nomen dubium, but it was until recently usually considered a valid heterodontosaurid. In 2005, a paper by Barrett and Xu focused on this problematic taxon and found its specimens to form an hypodigm, a chimera of different animals. The holotype, IVPP V4735a, was reclassified as a mesoeucrocodylian, while the paratype, IVPP V4735b, was found to be an indeterminate sauropodomorph.

To maintain the stability in the literature, the holotype retains the name D. lufengensis, while the paratype awaits a formal description.
