= Yunnanodon =

Yunnanodon Temporal range: Sinemurian, 196.0–189.0 Ma

Scientific classification
- Kingdom: Animalia
- Phylum: Chordata
- Clade: Synapsida
- Clade: Therapsida
- Clade: Cynodontia
- Family: †Tritylodontidae
- Genus: †Yunnanodon; Cui, 1986
- Species: †Y. brevirostre

Binomial name
- †Yunnanodon brevirostre Cui, 1976

Synonyms
- Yunnania brevirostre Cui, 1976 (preoccupied)

Extinct genus of mammaliamorphs

Yunnanodon ("Yunnan tooth", from China's Yunnan province where it was discovered, and the Greek odon (ὀδών) meaning "tooth") is an extinct genus of tritylodontid mammaliamorphs that lived in China during the Sinemurian stage of the Early Jurassic period. Its specific name brevirostre is Latin for "short-beaked" (brevis ("short") + rostrum ("beak")).

Yunnanodon was discovered in the Lower Lufeng Series, in Yunnan Province, China. As a tritylodontid, it belongs to one of the few cynodont groups to survive the Triassic–Jurassic extinction event. It was small, with adult skulls only reaching 36 to 47 mm (1.4 to 1.9 in) in length.
