= Chuxiongosaurus =

Chuxiongosaurus Temporal range: 200–191 Ma Early Jurassic

Scientific classification
- Kingdom: Animalia
- Phylum: Chordata
- Class: Reptilia
- Clade: Dinosauria
- Clade: Saurischia
- Clade: †Sauropodomorpha
- Clade: †Massopoda
- Genus: †Chuxiongosaurus; Lü et al., 2010
- Species: †C. lufengensis

Binomial name
- †Chuxiongosaurus lufengensis Lü et al., 2010

Extinct genus of dinosaurs

Chuxiongosaurus (meaning "Chuxiong lizard") is a genus of basal sauropodomorph dinosaur which lived during the Early Jurassic Period. Fossils of this genus have been found in the Lower Lufeng Formation, Yunnan Province, southern China. Identified from the holotype CMY LT9401 a nearly complete skull (including a lower jaw) with some similarities to Thecodontosaurus, it was described as the "first basal sauropod dinosaur from the Early Jurassic of China," more basal than Anchisaurus. It was named by Lü Junchang, Yoshitsugu Kobayashi, Li Tianguang and Zhong Shimin in 2010, and the type species is Chuxiongosaurus lufengensis. It is a possible junior synonym of Jingshanosaurus.
