= Lufengia =

Lufengia Temporal range: Sinemurian, 196.5–189.6 Ma

Scientific classification
- Domain: Eukaryota
- Kingdom: Animalia
- Phylum: Chordata
- Clade: Synapsida
- Clade: Therapsida
- Clade: Cynodontia
- Family: †Tritylodontidae
- Genus: †Lufengia

Type species
- Lufengia delicata Chow & Hu, 1959

Species
- L. delicata (type species) Chow & Hu, 1959

Synonyms
- Dianzhongia Cui, 1981; Bienotherium minor Young, 1947

Extinct genus of mammaliamorphs

Lufengia is an extinct genus of tritylodonts from the Sinemurian (Early Jurassic) Zhangjiawa Member of the Lufeng Formation of Yunnan, China. This taxon was recovered from the upper dark red beds in the Heiguopeng locality, along another Tritylodont, "Dianzhongia". This taxon represents the most abundant form in this layers, with up to 8 specimens. The holotype, MC V0009 is a fragmentary rostrum with upper post-canines and the posterior of the palatine. Another specimen was reported latter, CVEB12001, a partially crushed cranium. Thanks to this last find, it was proven that, IVPP V5072, named "Dianzhongia longirostrata" was just an older specimen of the same genus, indicating Lufengia skull sizes varied bewteeen 31 mm to 74.6 mm. The new specimen also showed Lufengia had continuous distomesial tooth replacement, like extant Heliophobius and Trichechus, indicating that maybe the postcanines were supernumerary and constantly replaced.
