= Strigosuchus =

Strigosuchus Temporal range: Early Jurassic

Scientific classification
- Kingdom: Animalia
- Phylum: Chordata
- Class: Sauropsida
- (unranked): Archosauria
- Superorder: ?Crocodylomorpha
- Suborder: ?Sphenosuchia
- Genus: Strigosuchus Simmons, 1965

Species
- Strigosuchus licinus Simmons, 1965 (type)

Extinct genus of reptiles

Strigosuchus is an extinct genus of crurotarsan from the Early Jurassic of China. Remains have been found from the Lower Lufeng Series in Yunnan. The genus was named by paleontologist D.J. Simmons in 1965 with the type species being S. licinus. Although originally classified as an ornithosuchid, the fragmentary holotype specimen of Strigosuchus has been suggested to be from a sphenosuchian rather than an ornithosuchid. Other Lufeng crocodylomorphs found in association with Strigosuchus include the protosuchian Platyognathus and the sphenosuchian Dibothrosuchus.
