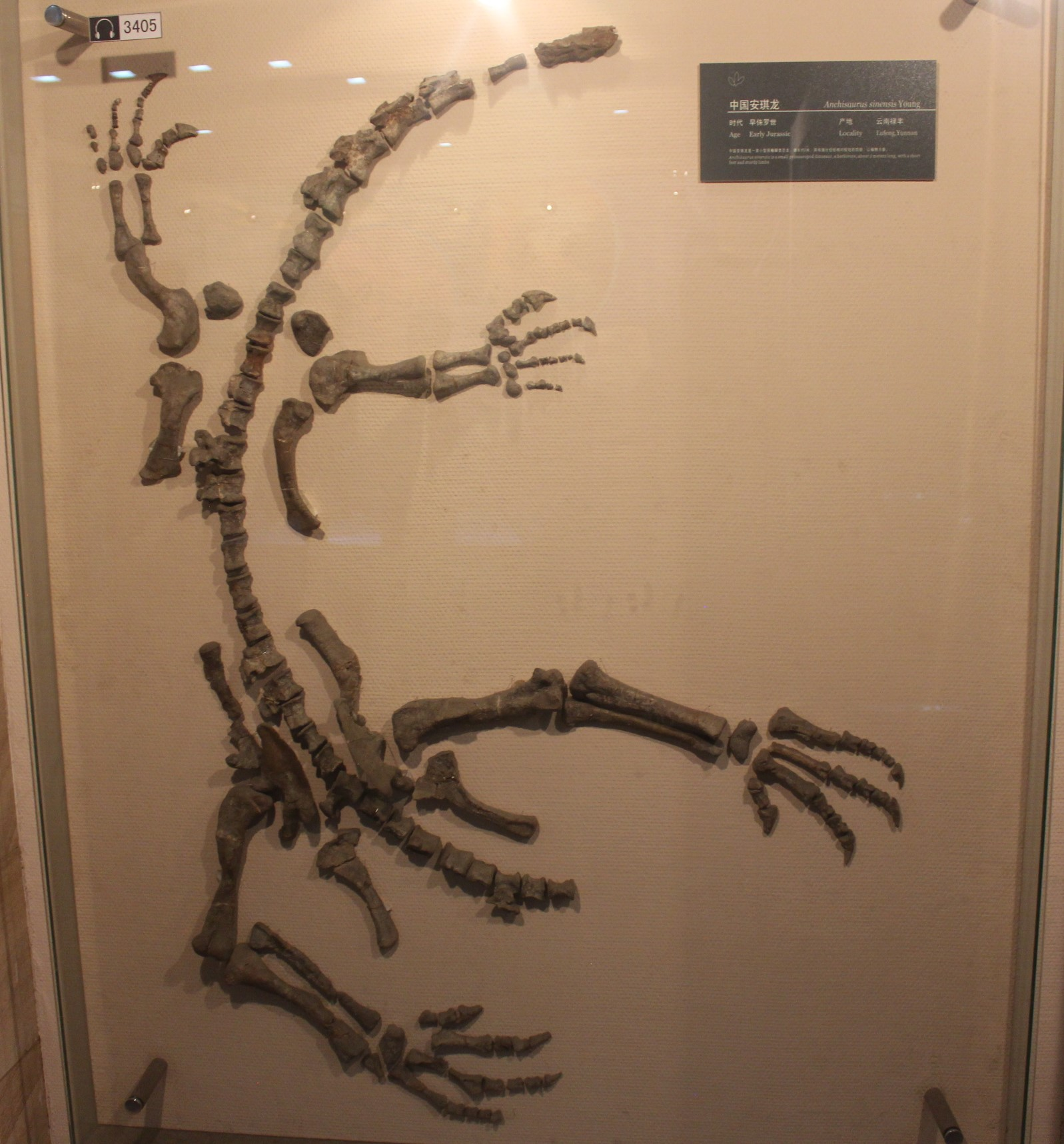
- "G". sinensis fossil on display at the Geological Museum of China

Scientific classification
- Kingdom: Animalia
- Phylum: Chordata
- Class: Reptilia
- Clade: Dinosauria
- Clade: Saurischia
- Clade: †Sauropodomorpha
- Clade: †Plateosauria
- Genus: †Gyposaurus; Broom, 1911

Type species
- †Gyposaurus capensis Broom, 1911

Other species
- †"G." sinensis Yang, 1941

Synonyms
- "Gripposaurus" Barrett et al. 2007 (nomen nudum)

= Gyposaurus =

Gyposaurus Temporal range: Early Jurassic, 196.5–189.6 Ma

Extinct genus of reptiles

Gyposaurus (meaning "vulture lizard", referring to the outdated hypothesis that prosauropods were carnivores) is a genus of basal sauropodomorph dinosaur from the early Jurassic of South Africa. It is usually considered to represent juveniles of other prosauropods, but "G." sinensis is regarded as a possibly valid species.

== Taxonomy ==
G. capensis was named in 1911 by Scottish physician and paleontologist Robert Broom from a partial skeleton consisting of eleven dorsal and six caudal vertebrae, ribs, gastralia, partial right scapula, right pelvic girdle, left ilium, and most of the right leg, discovered in the Upper Elliot Formation of Orange Free State, South Africa. Originally, he thought the specimen belonged to the dubious genus Hortalotarsus. Galton and Cluver placed it in the genus Anchisaurus in 1976, but Michael Cooper synonymized it with Massospondylus in 1981, which has been generally accepted.

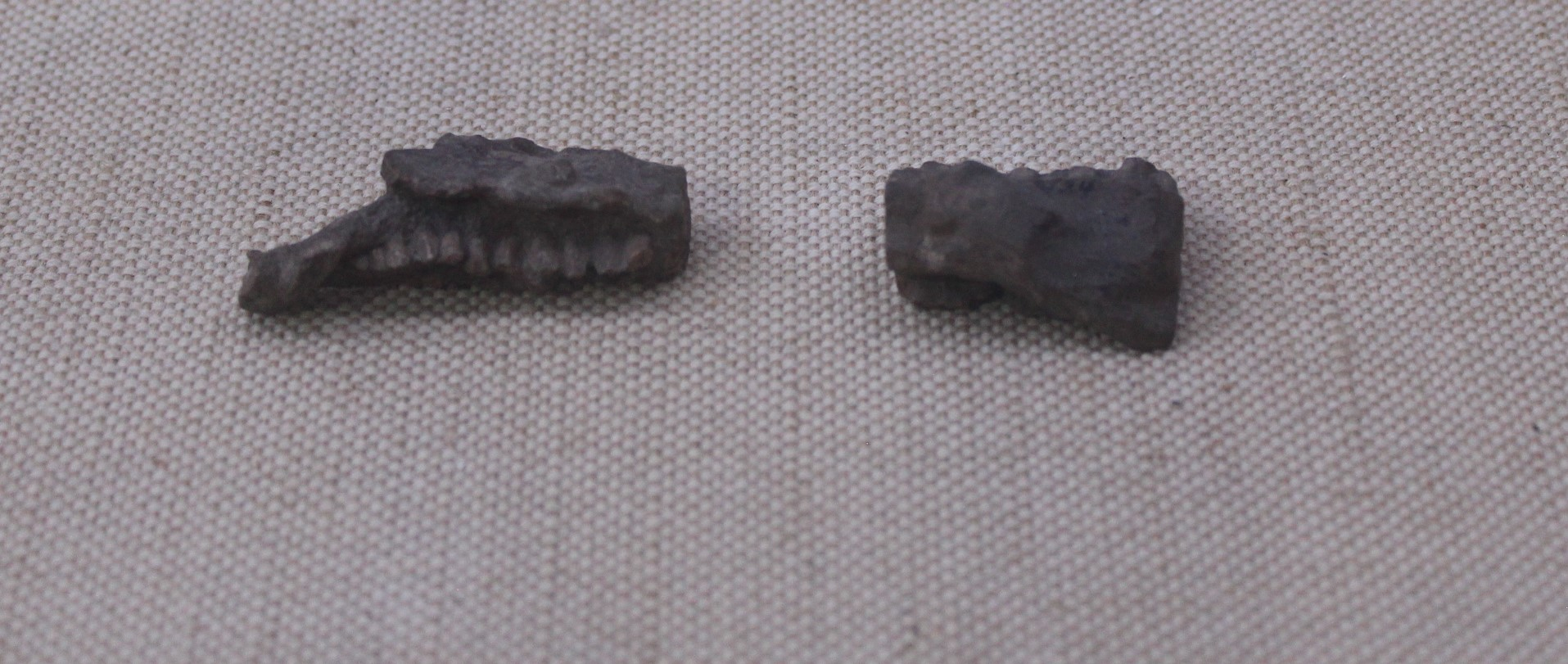
Syntype maxilla of "G." sinensis, Paleozoological Museum of China

"G." sinensis was named by Yang Zhongjian (C.C. Young) in 1941 for four specimens including jaw fragments and postcranial material from the Early Jurassic Lufeng Formation of Yunnan Province, China. In 1976, Galton referred it to Lufengosaurus, while Dong Zhiming referred it to Anchisaurus in 1992. Galton and Upchurch (2004) considered it to be a valid, distinct taxon in need of a new generic name. Barrett et al. (2007) proposed the name "Gripposaurus" for this species, but it is a nomen nudum. Unpublished results of a presentation by Wang and colleagues at the SVP 2017 conference indicate that "G." sinensis is a junior synonym of Lufengosaurus huenei; however, some referred specimens need further study to determine their relationships. Wang, Zhao & You (2024) agreed with this assessment.
