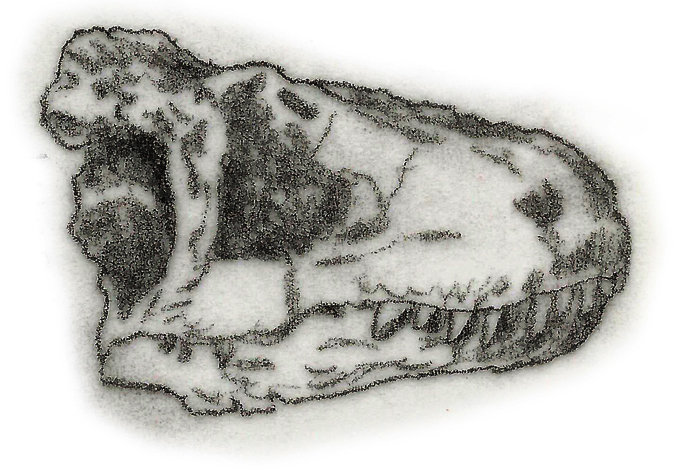
- Holotype skull and mandible
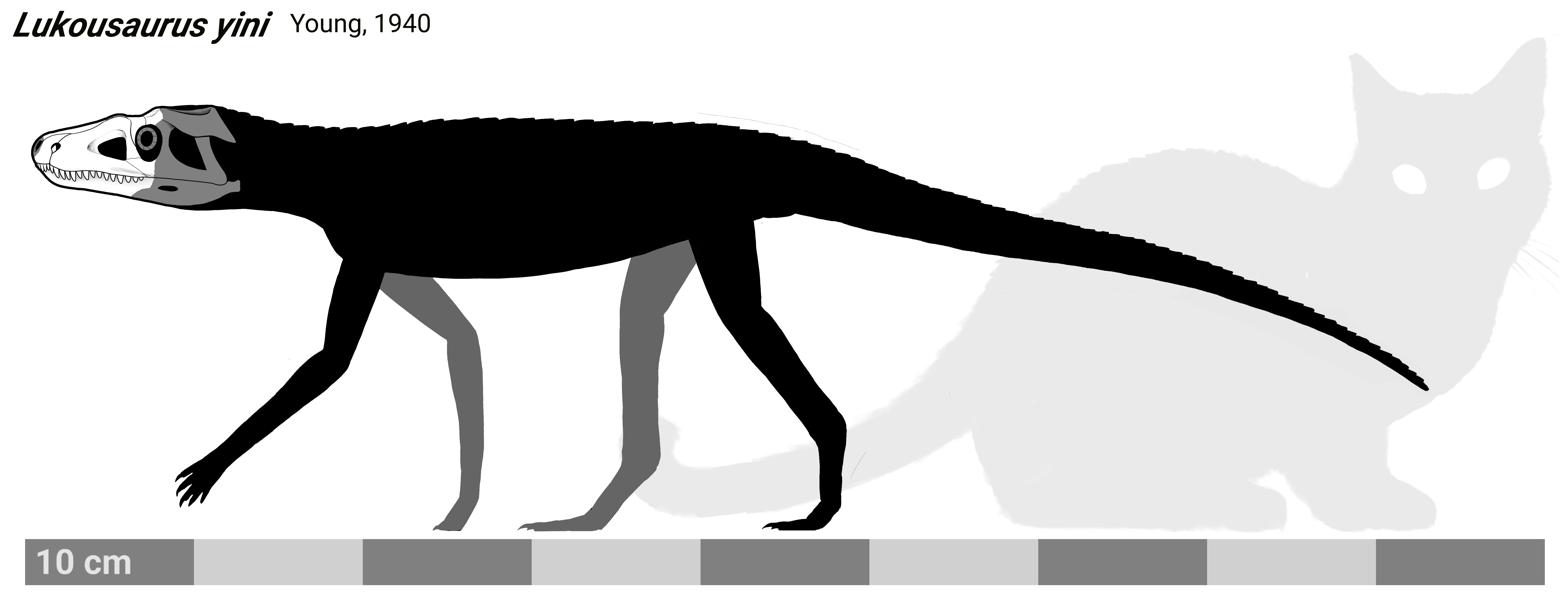
- Size comparison, known material in white

Scientific classification
- Kingdom: Animalia
- Phylum: Chordata
- Class: Reptilia
- Clade: Archosauromorpha
- Genus: †Lukousaurus; Young, 1940
- Species: †L. yini

Binomial name
- †Lukousaurus yini Young, 1940

= Lukousaurus =

Lukousaurus Temporal range: Early Jurassic (Sinemurian), 196.5–189.5 Ma

Extinct reptile genus

Lukousaurus is an extinct genus of archosauromorph based on most of a small snout, displaying distinctive lacrimal horns, found in the Early Jurassic lower Lufeng Formation of Yunnan, China. It was described by Chung Chien Young in 1940.

Lukousaurus was originally tentatively classified as a theropod dinosaur, allied with ceratosaurs or coelurosaurs, though other researchers have reinforced non-dinosaurian affinities, possibly related to suchians. Its skull is rather robust for its size, though the teeth were initially described as typically theropodan.

== History ==
In the late 1930s, a partial anterior skull and lower jaws, as well as a tooth and humerus were found in the town of Huangchiatien (also called Dahungtien) in Yunnan Province. The skull was found in the lower Jurassic strata of the Red Beds of the Lufeng Formation, though at the time of its naming in 1940 by Chung Chien Young, the beds were thought to date to the Triassic. Young noted that the skull is very strange, with morphologies similar to those of not just coelurosaurs, which he thought the taxon was, but also prosauropods and carnosaurs.

The generic name refers to the Lugou Bridge, lit. “crossroads”, near Beijing, where the Sino-Japanese War started and a symbol of the Chinese resistance against Japanese imperialism. The specific name honors the former deputy Director of the Geological Survey of China, T. H. Yin, who continued work on the survey despite the Japanese invasion. The holotype specimen is housed within the Institute of Vertebrate Paleontology and Paleoanthropology in Beijing, China under specimen number IVPP 23. Simmons (1965) assigned a distal humerus and co-ossified tibia and fibula to Lukousaurus, though there is no overlap these and the holotype.

== Classification ==
The classification of Lukousaurus is very uncertain due to the strange characteristics of the type specimen and its referred humerus. Lukousaurus was first described as a coelurosaur based on its postorbital and the shaped of the orbit compared to Saltopus, Podokesaurus, and Ammosaurus, though none of these taxa are now considered coelurosaurs. The size and "some characteristics of the skull" were also noted as being similar to Palaeosaurus, though Palaeosaurus is considered dubious. In his 1992 book on Chinese dinosaurs, Dong Zhiming assigned Lukousaurus to Podokesauridae, a similar conclusion to Young's original classification with Podokesaurus, though in 1997 Kenneth Carpenter placed it as an indeterminate theropod. In 2008, Mickey Mortimer believed that Lukousaurus was either an abelisaurid ceratosaur or a sphenosuchian, but revised her position in 2011 after recovering it as a basal pseudosuchian using a phylogenetic matrix developed by Sterling Nesbitt. Knoll et al. (2012) found Lukousaurus to be similar to suchian archosaurs in the anatomy of the antorbital fenestra and Irmis (2004) stated that Lukousaurus wasn't a theropod dinosaur or even a dinosauromorph in general.
