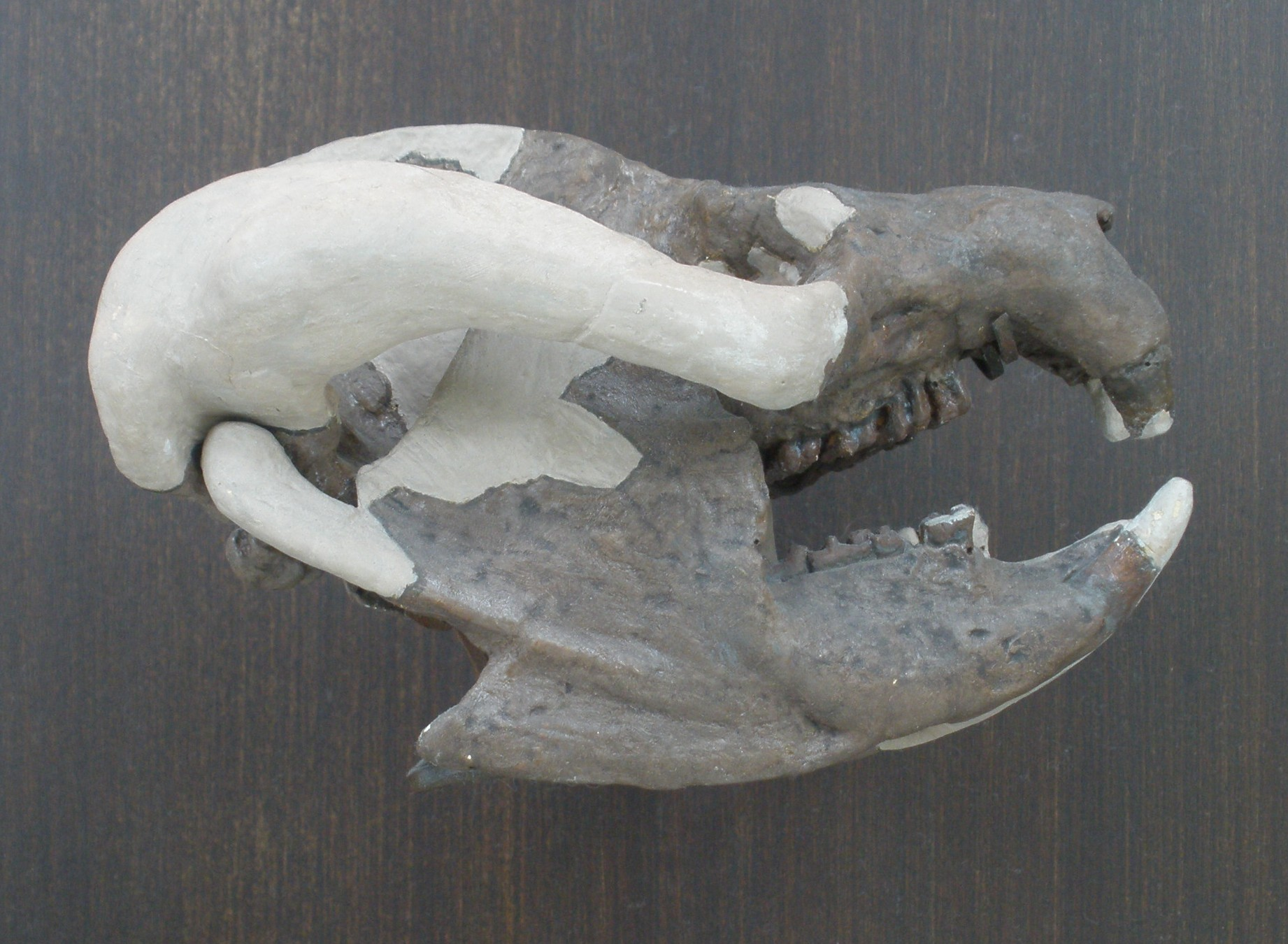
- Bienotherium yuannanese

Scientific classification
- Domain: Eukaryota
- Kingdom: Animalia
- Phylum: Chordata
- Clade: Synapsida
- Clade: Therapsida
- Clade: Cynodontia
- Family: †Tritylodontidae
- Genus: †Bienotherium; Young, 1940

Species
- B. yuannanese (type) Young, 1940; B. magnum

Synonyms
- B. elegans (B. yuannanese)

= Bienotherium =

Bienotherium Temporal range: Hettangian–Sinemurian

Extinct genus of mammaliamorphs

Bienotherium is an extinct genus of cynodonts from the Early Jurassic of China discovered by Bian Meinian (Mei Nien Bien). Despite its size, it is closely related to Lufengia, and is the largest tritylodont from the Lufeng Formation in China.

Bienotherium had four incisors, no canines, and back molar-like teeth, which it used to chew tough plant material.

== Description ==
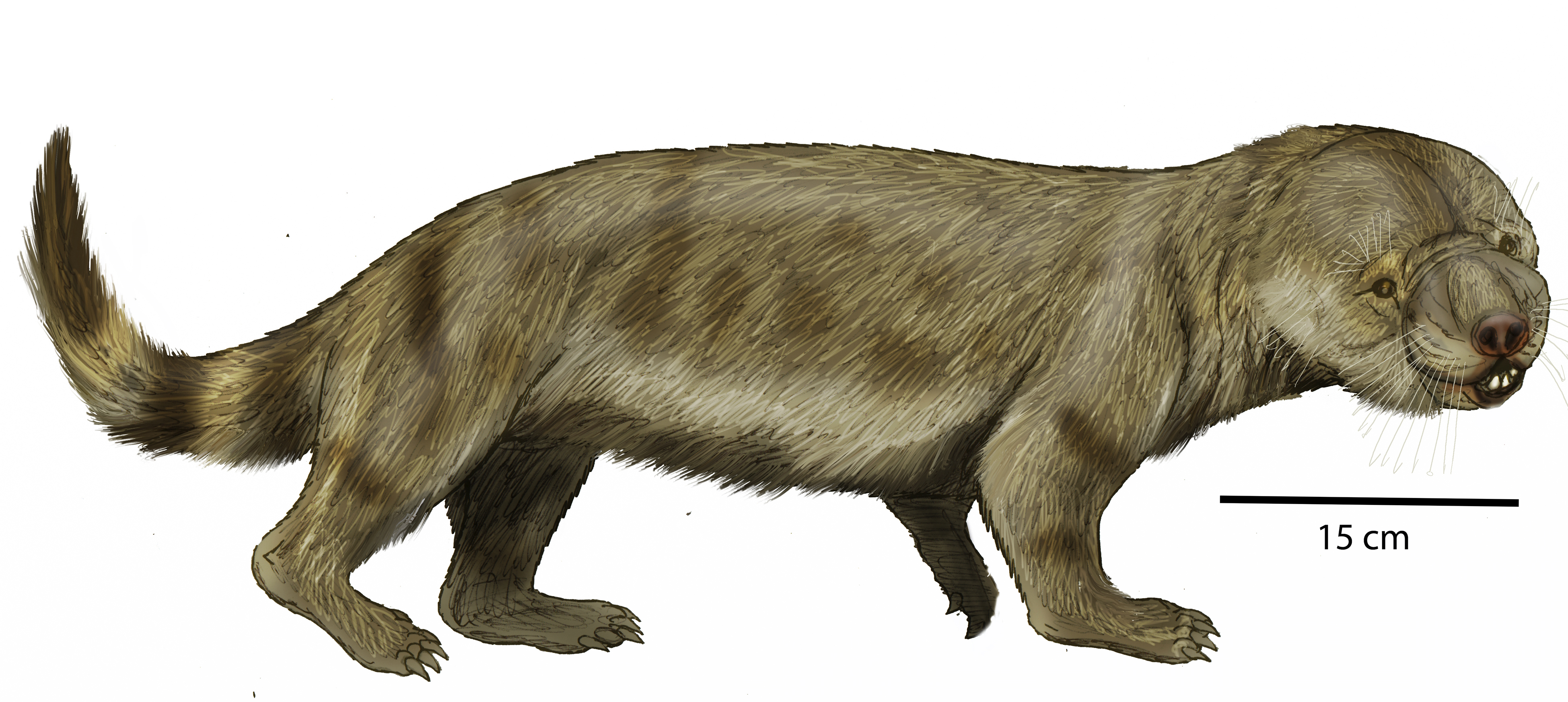
Life restoration

Bienotherium is defined as being big and robust compared to other tritylodonts, and also by exposed maxillaries in the skull, an unusually long diastema and thin zygomatic bone.
