= Lufeng Formation =

Geological Formation in China

- Stratigraphic range: Hettangian-Sinemurian; ~201–193 Ma
- Type: Geological formation
- Sub-units: Shawan & Zhangjia'ao Members
- Underlies: Chuanjie Formation
- Overlies: Precambrian slate basement
- Thickness: over 300 metres (980 ft)

Lithology
- Primary: Siltstone
- Other: Sandstone

Location
- Coordinates: 25.0°N 102.1°E
- Approximate paleocoordinates: 34.3°N 104.6°E
- Region: Yunnan
- Country: China
- Extent: Yunnan Basin
- Lufeng Formation (China) Lufeng Formation (Yunnan)

The Lufeng Formation (formerly Lower Lufeng Series) is a Lower Jurassic sedimentary rock formation found in Yunnan, China. It has two units: the lower Dull Purplish Beds/Shawan Member are of Hettangian age, and Dark Red Beds/Zhangjia'ao Member are of Sinemurian age. It is known for its fossils of early dinosaurs. The Dull Purplish Beds have yielded the possible therizinosaur Eshanosaurus, the possible theropod Lukousaurus, and the "prosauropods" "Gyposaurus" sinensis, Lufengosaurus, Jingshanosaurus, and Yunnanosaurus. Dinosaurs discovered in the Dark Red Beds include the theropod Sinosaurus triassicus, the "prosauropods" "Gyposaurus", Lufengosaurus, and Yunnanosaurus, indeterminate remains of sauropods, and the early armored dinosaurs Bienosaurus and Tatisaurus.

== Paleofauna ==
=== Rhynchocephalians ===
Rhynchocephalians reported from the Lufeng Formation
Genus	Species	Location	Stratigraphic position	Material	Notes
Clevosaurus	Indeterminate	Yunnan		Partial skulls and jaws.	The three named species do not display any autapomorphic characters and should be considered indeterminate within the genus. Only record of rhynchocephalians from Asia.

=== Crurotarsans ===
Crurotarsans reported from the Lufeng Formation
Genus	Species	Location	Stratigraphic position	Material	Notes
Dianchungosaurus	D. lufengensis	Yunnan	Dark Red Beds		Formerly considered an ornithopod dinosaur.
Dianosuchus	D. changchiawaensis	Lufeng, Yunnan	Dark Red Beds		
Microchampsa	M. scutata	Dahuangtian locality	Lower Red Beds	iIncomplete skeleton consisting of cervical and anterior dorsal vertebrae as well as ribs and three rows of dorsal osteoderms	
Phyllodontosuchus	P. lufengensis	Dawa, Yunnan	Dark Red Beds	BVP568-L12, a crushed skull	A potential non-carnivorous crocodrylomorph
Platyognathus	P. hsui	Lufeng, Yunnan	Zhangjiawa Member	IVPP V8266, rostral portion of a skull missing the dorsal bones and with articulated incomplete mandible; CVEB 21301, a nearly complete skull with articulated mandible, articulated with the anterior 17 vertebrae and associated dorsal osteoderms; part of the right scapulocoracoid; the left humerus; the right femur and proximal tibia and fibula	The oldest Gobiosuchoidean
Strigosuchus	S. licinus	Lufeng, Yunnan	Zhangjia'ao Member	FMNH CUP 2082	

=== Ornithischians ===
Indeterminate ornithopod remains Yunnan. Dark Red Beds.

Ornithischians reported from the Lufeng Formation
Genus	Species	Location	Stratigraphic position	Material	Notes
Bienosaurus	B. lufengensis	Yunnan	Dark Red Beds	A right "[d]entary with teeth," with additional cranial fragments such as a partial frontal. These specimens are catalogued as IVPP V 9612. The dentary preserves 11 teeth or roots with two additional empty alveoli.	
Tatisaurus	T. oehleri	Yunnan	Dark Red Beds	"Isolated dentary."	

=== Sauropodomorphs ===
Color key: Taxon / Reclassified taxon / Taxon falsely reported as present / Dubious taxon or junior synonym / Ichnotaxon / Ootaxon / Morphotaxon	Notes; Uncertain or tentative taxa are in small text; ~~crossed out~~ taxa are discredited.

Sauropodomorphs reported from the Lufeng Formation
Genus	Species	Location	Stratigraphic position	Material	Notes	Images
Chuxiongosaurus	C. lufengensis	Yunnan		"Skull"		Jingshanosaurus Lishulong Lufengosaurus Xingxiulong Yunnanosaurus
Gyposaurus	G. sinensis	Yunnan	~~Dark Red Beds~~; Dull Purplish Beds	"[Two] skeletons, [one] with partial skull, [two] partial skeletons, [three] skull fragments, adult."		Jingshanosaurus Lishulong Lufengosaurus Xingxiulong Yunnanosaurus
Fulengia	F. youngi	Yunnan	Dark Red Beds	"Skull."		Jingshanosaurus Lishulong Lufengosaurus Xingxiulong Yunnanosaurus
Jingshanosaurus	J. xinwaensis	Yunnan	Dull Purplish Beds	"Complete skeleton with skull, adult."		Jingshanosaurus Lishulong Lufengosaurus Xingxiulong Yunnanosaurus
"Kunmingosaurus"	"K. wusdingensis"	Yunnan	Dark Red Beds		nomen nudum	Jingshanosaurus Lishulong Lufengosaurus Xingxiulong Yunnanosaurus
Lishulong	L. wangi	Yunnan	Shawan Member	Skull and cervical vertebrae 2–10		Jingshanosaurus Lishulong Lufengosaurus Xingxiulong Yunnanosaurus
Lufengosaurus	L. huenei	Yunnan	Dark Red Beds; Dull Purplish		"(including Gyposaurus sinensis, L. magnus)"	Jingshanosaurus Lishulong Lufengosaurus Xingxiulong Yunnanosaurus
Lufengosaurus	L. magnus	Yunnan	Dark Red Beds; Dull Purplish			Jingshanosaurus Lishulong Lufengosaurus Xingxiulong Yunnanosaurus
Tawasaurus	T. minor	Yunnan	Dark Red Beds			Jingshanosaurus Lishulong Lufengosaurus Xingxiulong Yunnanosaurus
Xingxiulong	X. chengi	Yunnan				Jingshanosaurus Lishulong Lufengosaurus Xingxiulong Yunnanosaurus
Xingxiulong	X. yueorum	Yunnan	Zhangjiaao Member	LF2015-NO01, an articulated postcranial skeleton		Jingshanosaurus Lishulong Lufengosaurus Xingxiulong Yunnanosaurus
Yizhousaurus	Y. sunae	Yunnan	Zhangjiaao Member	Partial skeleton with skull		Jingshanosaurus Lishulong Lufengosaurus Xingxiulong Yunnanosaurus
Yunnanosaurus	Y. huangi	Yunnan	Dark Red Beds; Dull Purplish	"More than [twenty] partial to complete skeletons, [two] skulls, juvenile to adult."		Jingshanosaurus Lishulong Lufengosaurus Xingxiulong Yunnanosaurus
Yunnanosaurus	Y. robustus	Yunnan	Dark Red Beds; Dull Purplish			Jingshanosaurus Lishulong Lufengosaurus Xingxiulong Yunnanosaurus

=== Theropods ===
Theropods reported from the Lower Lufeng Formation
Genus	Species	Location	Stratigraphic position	Material	Notes	Images
Eshanosaurus	E. deguchiianus	Yunnan	Dull Purplish Beds	"Dentary."	Possible therizinosaur	Sinosaurus triassicus
Lukousaurus	L. yini	Yunnan	Dark Red Beds; Dull Purplish Beds	Holotype skull, tooth; Three bone fragments	Possible crocodylomorph	Sinosaurus triassicus
Sinosaurus	S. triassicus	Yunnan	Dark Red Beds; Dull Purplish Beds	Maxillary fragments, teeth, and a lower jaw fragment; Incomplete skull and other post-cranial fragments	Dilophosaurus sinensis specimen Now included in Sinosaurus	Sinosaurus triassicus
Panguraptor	P. lufengensis	Yunnan	Dull Purplish Beds	Partial skeleton	A coelophysoid	Sinosaurus triassicus

=== Cynodonts ===
Cynodonts reported from the Lufeng Formation
Genus	Species	Location	Stratigraphic position	Material	Notes	Images
Bienotherium	B. yuannanese; B. magnum				A tritylodontid	Skull of Morganucodon oehleri
Dianzhongia	D. longirostrata				A tritylodontid	Skull of Morganucodon oehleri
Hadrocodium	H. wui	Yunnan	Dark Red Beds	Skull	One of the oldest and smallest mammaliaforms known. Indicates a correlation between the separation of the middle ear bones from the mandible and the expanded brain vault in early mammals.	Skull of Morganucodon oehleri
Lufengia	L. delicata				A tritylodontid	Skull of Morganucodon oehleri
Morganucodon	M. oehleri; M. heikuopengensis		Zhangjiawa Member (M. heikuopengensis) Shawan Member (M. oehleri)		A morganucodontan	Skull of Morganucodon oehleri
Sinoconodon	S. rigneyi		Zhangjiawa Member		A mammaliamorph closely related to Mammaliaformes	Skull of Morganucodon oehleri
Yunnanodon	Y. brevirostre	Yunnan	Dark Red Beds		A tritylodontid	Skull of Morganucodon oehleri

== See also ==
- List of dinosaur-bearing rock formations
