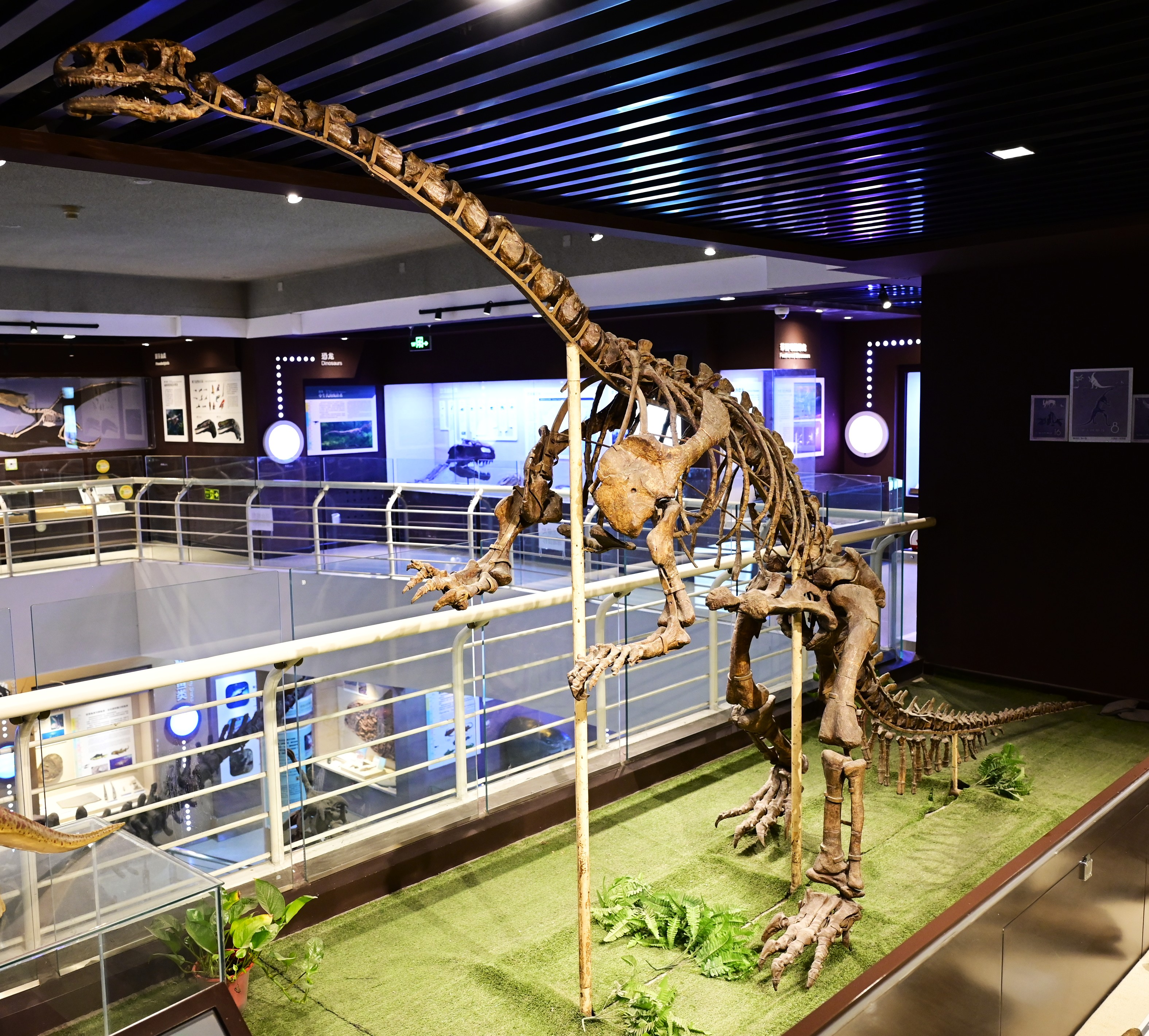
- Holotype of L. huenei on display at the Paleozoological Museum of China.

Scientific classification
- Kingdom: Animalia
- Phylum: Chordata
- Clade: Dinosauria
- Clade: Saurischia
- Clade: †Sauropodomorpha
- Family: †Massospondylidae
- Genus: †Lufengosaurus; Young, 1940

Species
- †L. huenei Young, 1940(type); †L. magnus Young, 1947

Synonyms
- Fulengia? Carroll and Galton, 1977; Gyposaurus? Broom, 1911; Tawasaurus Young, 1982

= Lufengosaurus =

Lufengosaurus Temporal range: Early Jurassic, 195–190 Ma

Sauropodomorph massospondylid dinosaur genus from Early Jurassic period

Lufengosaurus (Chinese: 祿豐龍 or 禄丰龙, meaning "Lufeng lizard") is a genus of massospondylid dinosaur which lived during the Early Jurassic period in what is now southwestern China.

== History of Discovery ==
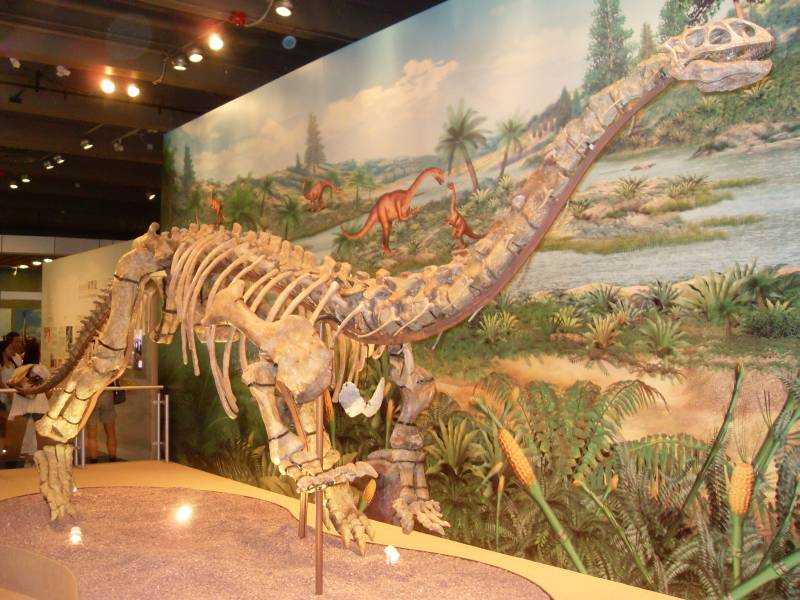
Lufengosaurus in a quadrupedal pose, skeleton donated to the Hong Kong Science Museum in 1998

The first remains of Lufengosaurus were found during the late 1930s by geologist Bien Meinian in the Lower Lufeng Formation at Shawan, near Lufeng in the Yunnan Province of China. From 1938 onwards, Meinian was joined by paleontologist C. C. Young (Chinese: 杨钟健, Yáng Zhōngjiàn). Young would go on to name the animal's type species, Lufengosaurus huenei, in 1940, with the generic name referring to Lufeng where it was found and the specific name honoring Young's old tutor, the German paleontologist Friedrich von Huene. Young would go on to publish a detailed description of the animal the following year and would assign specimen IVPP V15 as the holotype of the species, this specimen consisting of a nearly complete skeleton with a well-preserved skull.

A second species of Lufengosaurus, L. magnus, was also named by Young in 1940 in the same paper as Lufengosaurus huenei and would be fully described by him in 1947. As its specific name suggests, with the word magnus meaning "the large one" in Latin, this species was considered separate from L. huenei due to its significantly larger size, with it being up to a third larger than L. huenei in length. However, most authors have regarded it as a junior synonym of L. huenei, with its specimens being said to simply represent larger individuals of the type species.

Another "prosauropod" Young named in 1940, Gyposaurus sinensis, was noted by him to be distinct from Lufengosaurus on behalf of the limbs being at least 50% smaller, though similarities in overall form were noted. This genus has subsequently been referred to Lufengosaurus on two separate occasions: once by Peter Galton in 1976 and once in a 2017 SVP presentation by Wang and colleagues. The referral is however doubted by some.

Lufengosaurus would be referred to another genus yet again in the 1980s, with Michael Cooper suggesting that Lufengosaurus and Yunnanosaurus were species of the South African genus Massospondylus 1981. However, a reanalysis in 2005 by Paul Barrett and colleagues, performed on the skull of Lufengosaurus huenei established it firmly as a valid genus separate from both Massospondylus and Yunnanosaurus based on craniodental characteristics. This same 2005 study would provide an extensive and detailed redescription of the cranial osteology of the holotype skull of the animal.

The year 1985 saw Zhao Xijin name a new species of the animal in a list of Jurassic reptiles from China. Zhao named it Lufengosaurus "changduensis", with the naming of the animal being prompted by the recovery of a specimen from Tibet. The species has however remained undescribed and thus a nomen nudum, with neither the reported Tibetan specimen nor any other material being formally assigned to it after it was named.

In 2015, preserved collagen protein was found in a Lufengosaurus fossil by an international team led by Yao-Chang Lee of Taiwan's National Synchrotron Radiation Research Center. The protein, described in Nature Communications (2017 January 31), was over 100 million years older than any previously recorded fossil protein, having sizeable implications for our understanding of protein preservation.

== Description ==
Size of L. huenei (light green) and L. magnus (dark green)

Lufengosaurus is often described as a rather small early sauropodomorph, about 6 metres (20 ft) long. However, when the L. magnus specimens are included, its size is more considerable: Gregory S. Paul estimated a length of 9 metres (30 ft) and a weight of 1.7 metric tons (1.9 short tons) in 2010, while Benson et al. (2014) estimated a mass of 2.3 tonnes (2.5 short tons). For an early sauropodomorph, its neck is rather long and the forelimbs are relatively short. From these it was inferred that the species was bipedal, even before it became common to assume this for all basal sauropodomorphs. Yang published a full osteology of Lufengosaurus in 1941, but was severely hampered in his diagnosis by the war conditions, preventing a full access to literature and making an adequate comparison with related forms impossible. Of the skull a modern description exists. The skull of the holotype is 25 centimetres (9.8 in) long.

=== Skull ===
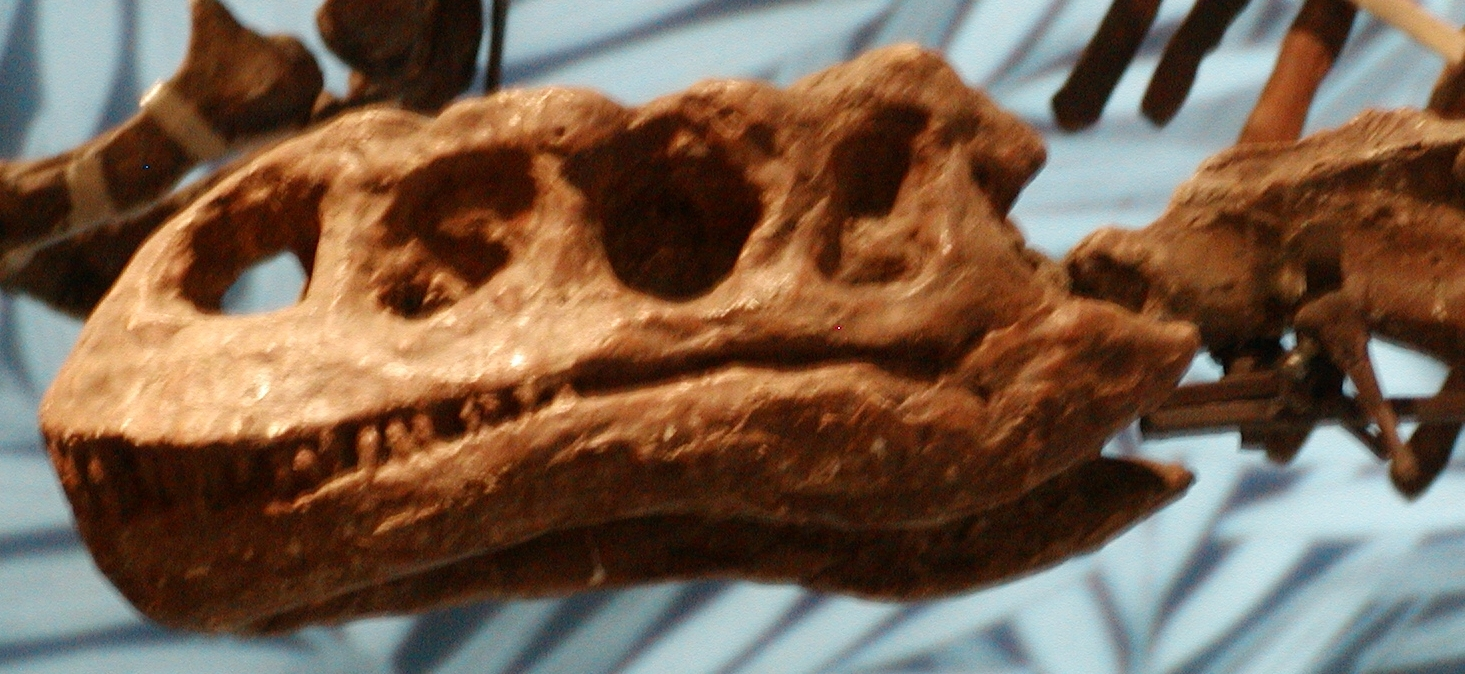
Lufengosaurus magnus skull, Beijing Museum of Natural History

Lufengosaurus snout was deep and broad, and it had distinctive bony bumps just behind its large nostrils and on its cheeks. A bony ridge on the side of its upper jaw might have helped anchor soft tissue. If so, then Lufengosaurus must have had larger cheeks than most other sauropodomorphs. Its closely spaced, serrated teeth suited a diet of leaves.

About thirty major specimens have been discovered, including those of juveniles. In 1958 a specimen of Lufengosaurus was the first complete dinosaur skeleton mounted in China; a commemorative postage stamp of 8 yuan was issued on 15 April 1958 to celebrate the event, the first time ever a dinosaur was depicted on a stamp. The skeleton is now on display in the Paleozoological Museum of China in Beijing.

== Classification ==
Young originally assigned Lufengosaurus to the Plateosauridae of the suborder Prosauropoda, noting that it stood close to Plateosaurus fraasianus. It is still sometimes considered a member of Plateosauridae, though some cladistic analyses have found it to be a member of Massospondylidae instead. This matches with our current knowledge of Lufengosaurus' anatomy, which has proven to be more similar to taxa like Coloradisaurus and Massospondylus than was previously thought, with Lufengosaurus formerly being considered to have more anatomical similarities with Plateosaurus. Lufengosaurus has historically had a maximum of three named species, only one of these being almost unilaterally considered valid nowadays: L. huenei. The other two species, L. magnus and L. "changduensis", are respectively considered a junior synonym and a nomen nudum. Specimens assigned to L. magnus in the past are now referred to the type species instead.

Barret, Upchurch and Wang recovered Lufengosaurus as being the sister taxon to Gyposaurus sinensis in their 2005 cladistic analysis. A differing result was recovered from a cladistic analysis done by Fernando E. Novas and colleagues in 2011, which recovered the animal as the sister taxon to Glacialisaurus hammeri. This result was replicated by Oliver W. M. Rauhut and colleagues' 2020 analysis. A simplified version of the resulting cladogram, not showing the part including the Sauropodiform taxa, is shown below.

- Massopoda
  - - Eucnemesaurus
    - Riojasaurus
  - - Sarahsaurus
    - - Massospondylidae
        - - Yunnanosaurus
          - - Jingshanosaurus
            - Seitaad
        - - - Coloradisaurus
            - - Glacialisaurus
              - Lufengosaurus
          - - Massospondylus
            - - Adeopapposaurus
              - Leyesaurus
      - - Sauropodiformes

== Palaeobiology ==
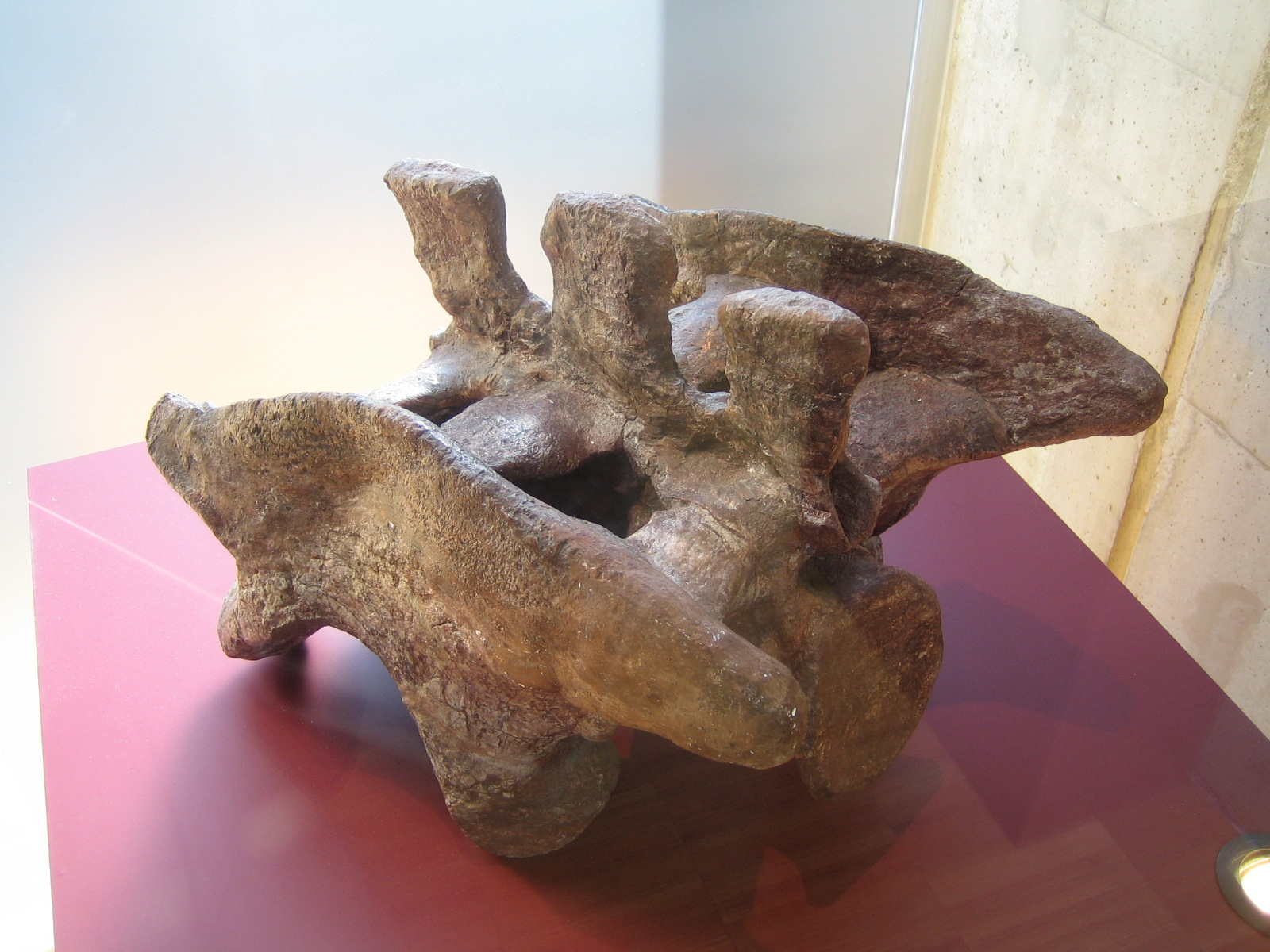
Lufengosaurus huenei pelvis.

Like all early sauropodomorphs, Lufengosaurus had much longer hindlimbs than forelimbs and was probably bipedal. It was herbivorous, although it had sharp claws (with an especially large thumb claw) and teeth. These features have been used to support claims, the most recent by Cooper in 1981, that Lufengosaurus may have been at least partially omnivorous, but the sharp teeth witnessed in Lufengosaurus and other early sauropodomorphs are similar to those seen in iguanaian lizards – which are herbivorous. Alternatively, the claws may have been used for defense or raking foliage from trees. Embryos of this genus also represent the earliest evidence of vertebrate soft tissue preservation. Lufengosaurus likely engaged in parental feeding as a fully altricial animal, given that the bone development in its femora is closer to that of altricial pigeons than precocious chickens.

== Palaeoecology ==
While originally considered to be a Triassic locality, nowadays the Lufeng Formation is dated to the Lower Jurassic instead (Hettangian-Sinemurian), implying that Lufengosaurus existed in a more recent timeframe than previously thought.

== Sources ==
- Dong Zhiming (1988). Dinosaurs from China. China Ocean Press, Beijing & British Museum (Natural History). ISBN 978-0-565-01073-7.
- Dong Zhiming (1992). Dinosaurian Faunas of China. China Ocean Press, Beijing. ISBN 978-3-540-52084-9.
