= Yang Zhongjian =

Chinese paleontologist and zoologist (1897–1979)

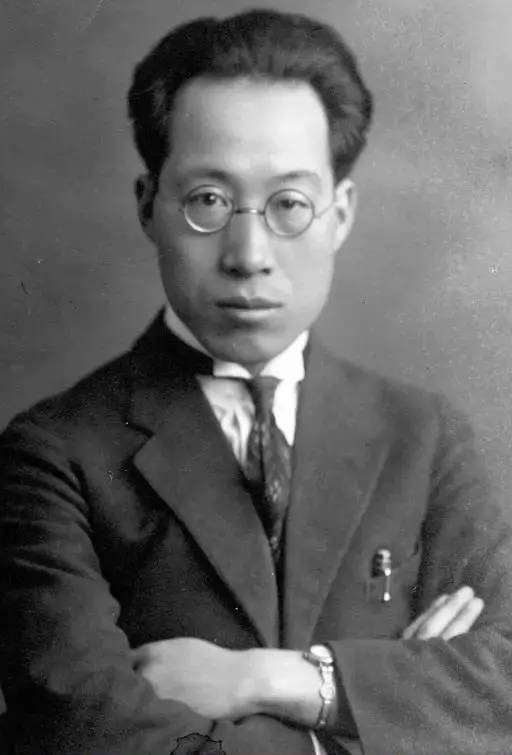
- Yang Zhongjian in 1922, Uppsala, Sweden
- Born: June 1, 1897; Hua County, Shaanxi, China
- Died: January 15, 1979 (aged 81)
- Other name: Chung Chien Young
- Education: Peking University; Ludwig-Maximilians-Universität München
- Scientific career
- Fields: Zoology; paleontology

Yang Zhongjian, also Yang Chung-chien (Chinese: 杨钟健; Wade–Giles: Yang^{2} Chung^{1}-chien^{4}; 1 June 1897 – 15 January 1979), courtesy name Keqiang (克强), also known as C.C. (Chung Chien) Young, was a Chinese paleontologist and zoologist. He was one of China's foremost vertebrate paleontologists. He has been called the "Father of Chinese Vertebrate Paleontology".

== Biography ==
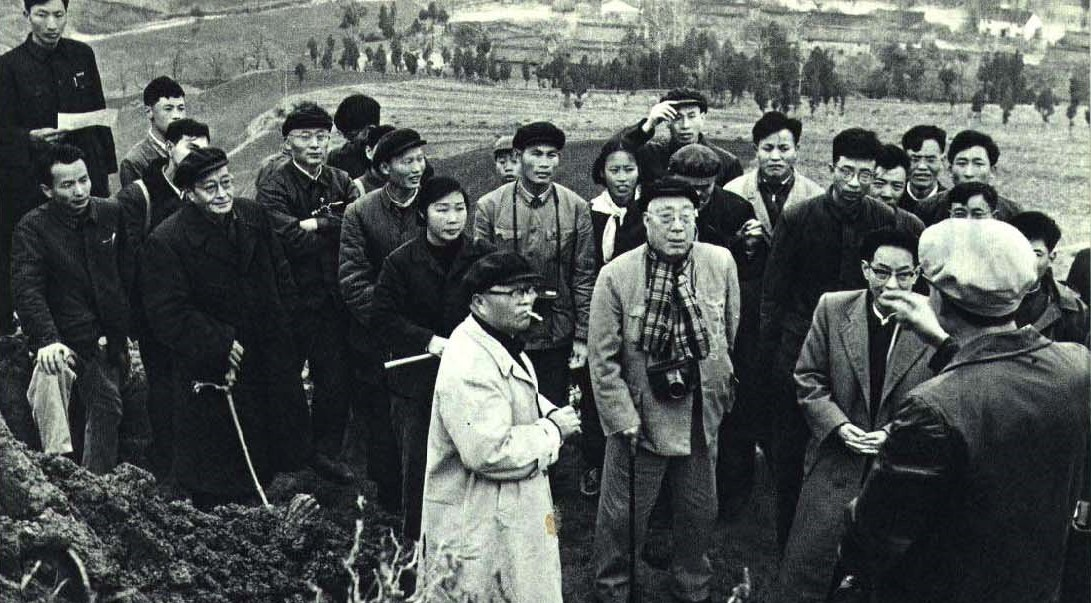
Yang (center) at the Lantian Man site in 1965

Yang was born in Hua County, Shaanxi, China. He graduated from the Department of Geology of Peking University in 1923, and in 1927 received his doctorate from the Ludwig-Maximilians-Universität München in Germany. In 1928, he worked for the Cenozoic Research Laboratory of the Geological Survey of China and took charge of excavations at the Peking Man Site at Zhoukoudian.

He held professorial posts at the Geological Survey of China, Peking University, and Northwest University in Xi'an. Yang's scientific work was instrumental in the creation of China's Institute of Vertebrate Paleontology and Paleoanthropology in Beijing, which today houses one of the most important collections of fossil vertebrates in the world. He was director of both the IVPP and the Beijing Natural History Museum.

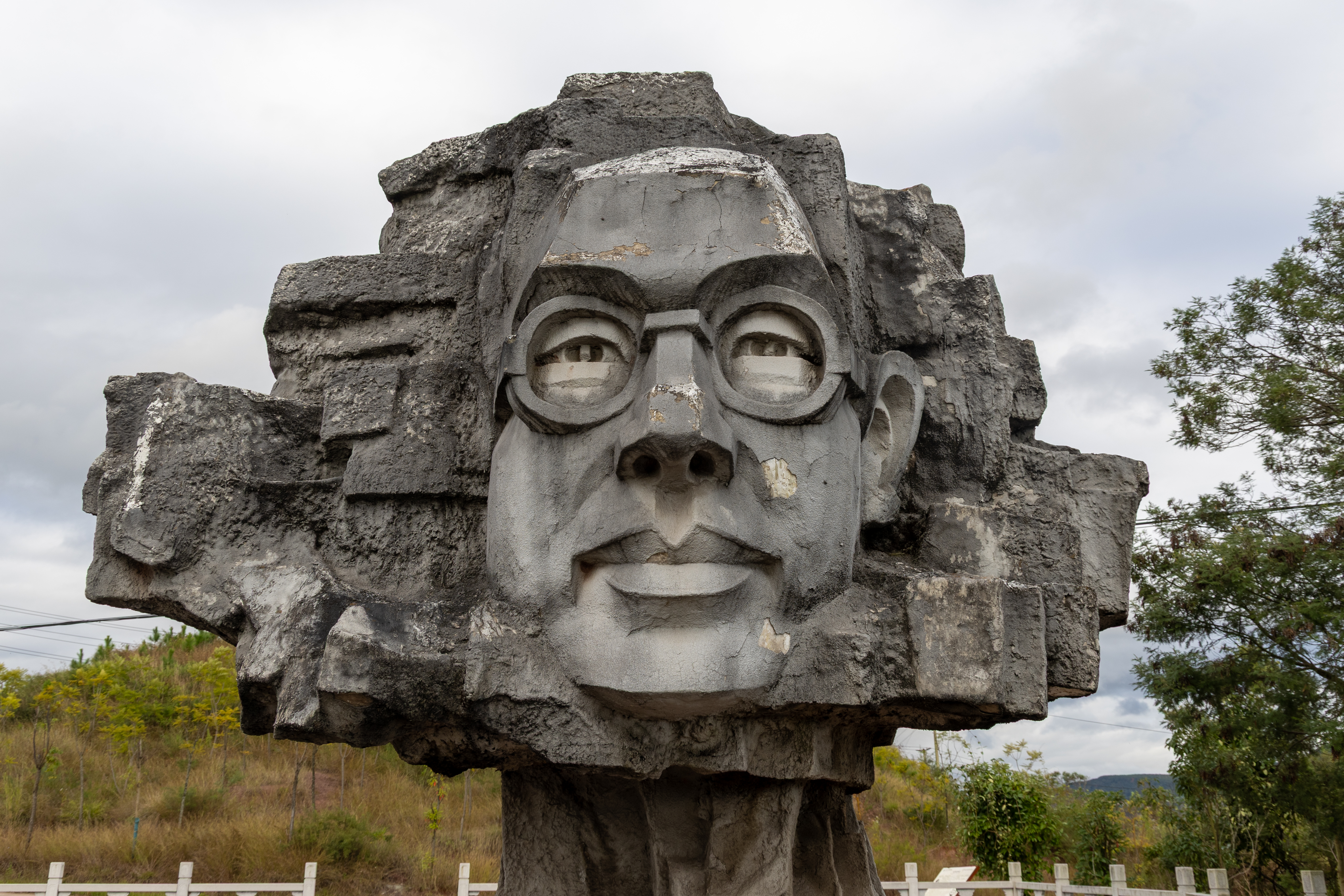
Statue of Yang Zhongjian at Dawa Dinosaur Mountain, Lufeng, Yunnan

He supervised the collection of fossil remains of and research on dinosaurs in China from 1933 until the 1970s. He presided over some of the most important fossil discoveries in history, such as those of the prosauropods Lufengosaurus and Yunnanosaurus, the ornithopod Tsintaosaurus, and the gigantic sauropod Mamenchisaurus, as well as China's first stegosaur, Chialingosaurus.

== Legacy ==
Yang's cremated remains are interred behind the museum at the Zhoukoudian site alongside those of his colleagues, Pei Wenzhong and Jia Lanpo.

In 2007, when Lü Junchang and colleagues described a second species of Yunnanosaurus, they named it Yunnanosaurus youngi in Yang's honour.
