= List of sauropodomorph type specimens =

This list of specimens is a comprehensive catalogue of all type specimens and their scientific designations for each genus and species within the clade Sauropodomorpha.

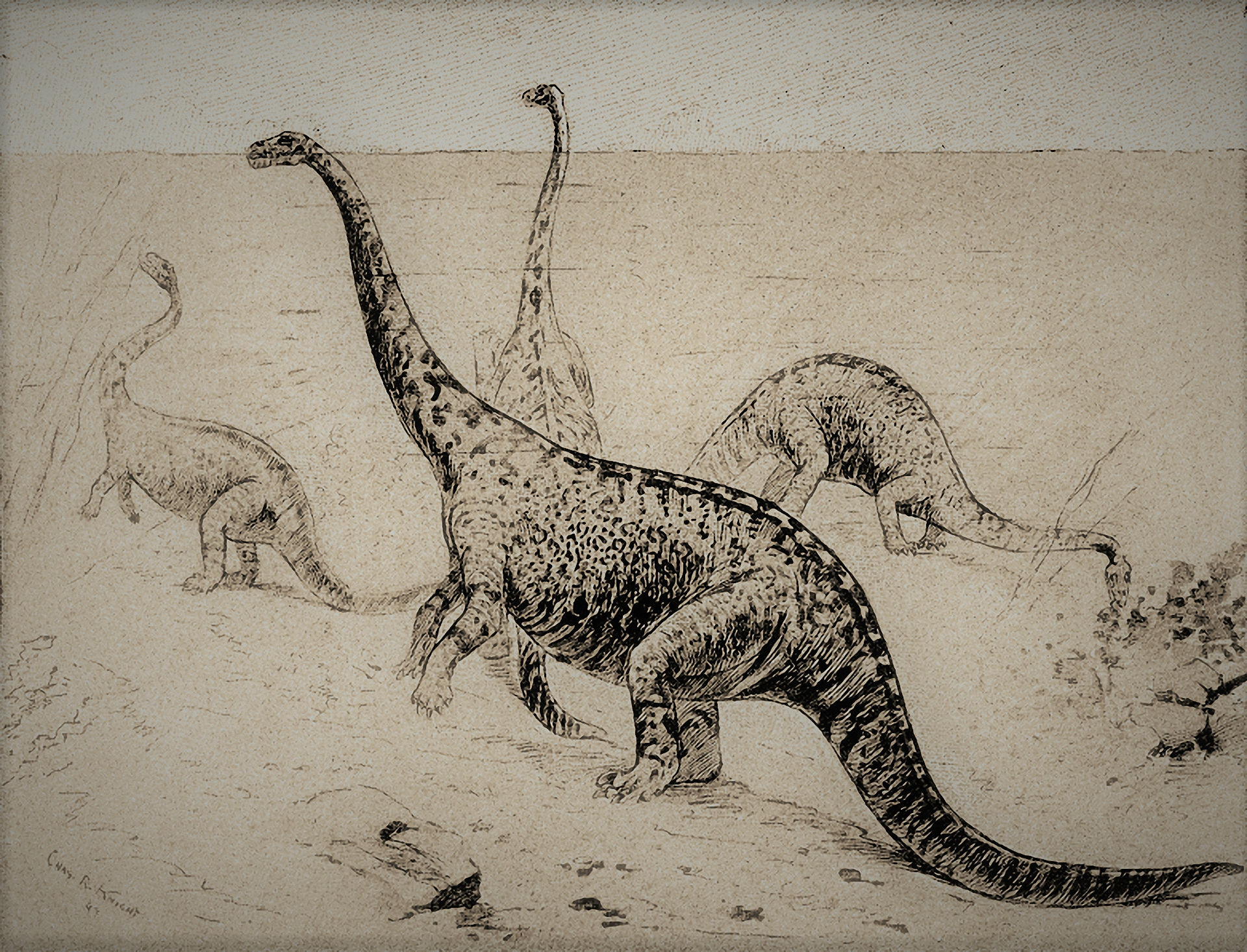
An early reconstruction of the sauropod Amphicoelias by E.D. Cope

Sauropodomorpha is a clade of saurischian dinosaurs that includes the largest land animals to have ever existed on Earth, such as Argentinosaurus, Brachiosaurus, and Patagotitan. The clade "sauropodomorpha" was created based on the earlier-named and slightly more exclusive clade, Sauropoda. This clade was named by Othniel Charles Marsh in 1878; it translates to "lizard feet", in reference to the fact that sauropods were unique among the dinosaurs known at the time for having five toes, instead of three (such as in theropods and ornithopods). "Sauropodomorpha" then roughly translates to "in the likeness of the lizard feet". The first sauropodomorph to be described was Cardiodon, named by Sir Richard Owen, although he did not recognize at the time that it was a dinosaur.

Sauropodomorphs were among the first dinosaur groups to appear, originating in the late Triassic period. While ancestrally bipedal, sauropodomorphs increased in mass throughout the Triassic and quadrupedal forms evolved. In the Jurassic period, the first unequivocal sauropods appeared. Thereafter, sauropods lived until the end of the Cretaceous period, and were present on every continent, including Antarctica. The largest sauropods have been estimated to weigh at least 70 metric tons, larger than any other animals besides the largest cetaceans, and possibly even larger.

== Scope and terminology ==
This list will include the type fossils of each sauropodomorph species. In paleontology, a type specimen is, by definition, a member of a biological taxon. Additional specimens can only be "referred" to these taxa if an expert deems them sufficiently similar to the type and publishes that opinion in the scientific literature.

There is no complete, canonical list of all dinosaur taxa or holotype specimens. The primary source for this list is a book called Dinosaur Facts and Figures: The Sauropods and Other Sauropodomorphs by Rubén Molina-Pérez and Asier Larramendi which contains every sauropodomorph species described up to the date of its completion (January 1, 2019), including dubious or very fragmentary specimens. This is supplemented by references to the Princeton Field Guide to Dinosaurs by Gregory Paul and Dinosaurs: The Most Complete, Up-to-Date Encyclopedia for Dinosaur Lovers of All Ages by Thomas Holtz and Luis Rey. Where appropriate, The Paleobiology Database and Fossilworks, which are both online databases of named fossil taxa, are used to supplement the entries from published encyclopedias which are missing or data-deficient. Another useful resource is the Smithsonian Institution's Paleobiology Collections Database, which has a large, publicly accessible fossil collection.

=== Type system ===
Types are also used to diagnose higher-level taxa than an individual. One individual might represent the "type specimen" of a particular species. This species would in turn represent the "type species" of a particular genus, unless it is referred to a previously undescribed genus. Most dinosaur genera are monospecific, and most type specimens are also the type species of their respective genera. On this list, the type species of a genus is only noted when it belongs to a genus with multiple referred species, such as Camarasaurus or Plateosaurus. Furthermore, when an animal is different enough from its close relatives that it is given its own family, it is conventional in dinosaur systematics to name a family after the first described, most famous, or most abundant genus assigned to it. Therefore, on this list, the type species of any type genus for a family or sub-family level taxon is also noted when appropriate.

There are several different varieties of type specimens when referring to fossil animals:

- Holotype: This is the most common and simplest form of type specimen. A holotype is the first specimen of a fossil taxon described in the scientific literature. To qualify as a true holotype, all of the fossils of the type must belong to the same individual animal. All type specimens on this list are holotypes, unless otherwise indicated.
- Paratype(s): These are described in the same publication as the holotype. A paratype is designated when the fossil material is diagnostic enough to belong to the same species as the holotype, but it is not from the same individual animal. In these cases, the holotype and paratype(s) are collectively called the "type series" for that taxon. On this list, paratypes are noted in the same entry as their associated holotype.
- Neotype: When a holotype specimen is lost, destroyed, or otherwise unable to be studied further by scientists, a new type specimen for that taxon is required to identify future material. On this list, neotypes are given their own entries only when the holotype was never formally assigned a specimen number; otherwise, they are noted in the holotype entry.
- Syntype(s): This is a type series in which no single specimen is selected to serve as a holotype, nor are any designated as paratypes. This is typically done when the fossil material is believed to be from multiple animals, but none of the individual animals were well enough preserved to provide a complete list of diagnostic characters. These are also sometimes called "cotypes" in publications, although this is discouraged by the ICZN.
- Lectotype: When a single type specimen from a series of syntypes is designated as the new primary type specimen in a subsequent publication, this is considered to be a lectotype. On this list, lectotypes are given their own entries.
- Paralectotype(s): When a lectotype is designated from a series of syntypes, the remaining syntypes become paralectotypes as part of a reorganized type series. On this list, paralectotypes are noted alongside the list entry for the lectotype of their respective series.
- Plastotype: Sometimes, if a cast of a type specimen is made and the original type specimen is lost or destroyed, the cast can be used for diagnostic referral to a taxon. Plastotypes are included in this list only if the holotype was not assigned a specimen number. Otherwise, they are noted alongside the holotype entry.
- Topotype: When a specimen is discovered from the same locality as a holotype specimen, it may be given a new specimen number. If the second specimen is later determined to belong to the same animal as the holotype after the holotype has been described, it becomes a topotype.

All name-bearing type specimens (i.e., holotypes, lectotypes, neotypes, and syntypes) have unique entries on this list, and non-name-bearing types (i.e., paratypes, paralectotypes, topotypes, and holotypes that a neotype has subsumed) are noted alongside their name-bearing counterpart.

=== Validity ===
Some described species are later determined to be invalid by subsequent scientific publications. However, invalid species are sometimes resurrected, such as in the case of Brontosaurus, and sometimes the validity of a species can be controversial among researchers (e.g. the case of Torosaurus and Triceratops). For neutrality and completeness, all described species and genera of sauropodomorphs are included, even those that have been considered invalid by subsequent scientific publications.

Naming conventions and terminology follow the International Code of Zoological Nomenclature (ICZN). Technical terms used include:

- Junior synonym: A name which describes the same taxon as a previously published name. If two or more taxa are formally designated and the type specimens are later assigned to the same taxon, the first to be published (in chronological order) is the senior synonym, and all other instances are junior synonyms. Senior synonyms are generally used, except by special decision of the ICZN, but junior synonyms cannot be used again, even if deprecated. Junior synonymy is often subjective, unless the genera described were both based on the same type specimen.
- Nomen dubium (Latin for "dubious name"): A name describing a fossil with no unique diagnostic features. This can be an extremely controversial designation, and as such, they are only notated when their supposedly dubious status has been formally published. Furthermore, if the scientific community has yet to reach a consensus on the validity of a name or taxon, the ongoing controversy will be noted.
- Nomen nudum (Latin for "naked name"): A name that has appeared in print but has not yet been formally published by the standards of the ICZN. Nomina nuda (the plural form) are invalid and are not included on this list.
- Preoccupied name: A name that is formally published, but which has already been used for another taxon. This second use is invalid (as are all subsequent uses), and the name must be replaced.

=== Omissions ===
Some sauropodomorph taxa are not included on this list. Nomina nuda are excluded because a type does not become recognized by the ICZN until it is published in a scientific journal with a full description.

Some misidentified taxa are also not included, so long as there is a scientific consensus concerning the specimen in question. If a specimen is later referred to a taxon outside Sauropodomorpha, it is not included on this list. However, specimens identified as sauropodomorphs in subsequent publications are included under the name assigned to them within Sauropodomorpha.

Referred taxa are only included on the list as separate entries when their initial description includes a unique type specimen.

== List of specimens ==
- Binomial name: All animal species are given a unique binomial name, typically consisting of Latin or Greek words which are used to formally and scientifically identify each species.
- Catalogue number: In most museum collections, each fossil specimen will be given a unique catalogue number, which is published with the description of the fossils after they are prepared. This serves as a formal name for each described fossil, allowing authors to refer to individual fossil discoveries in the scientific literature by name.
- Institution: Most published fossils are stored in museum collections or at universities. This is also true of type specimens, many of which are on display in museums around the world. If a type specimen has been lost, the last known location of the type is listed.
- Age: The geological stage from which the specimen was recovered is listed, when it is known. The exact ages of some geological formations are unknown. If this is the case, a range of possible ages is given.
- Unit: Most fossils are recovered from named geologic formations (e.g., the Morrison Formation or the Hell Creek Formation). When this is not the case, a city or landmark near the locality from which the fossil was recovered is listed.
- Material: The vast majority of fossils do not preserve the complete skeleton of an animal. In these cases, the specific bones that are fossilized have been listed.
- Notes: Other general information, such as the validity status of the taxon in question, or any other material in the type series, may be listed here.

Binomial Name	Catalogue number(s)	Institution	Age	Unit	Material	Notes	Image
Aardonyx celestae	BP/1/6254	Evolutionary Studies Institute	Sinemurian	Elliot Formation, South Africa	Partial maxilla	Additional material was found in association, but this was not included in the holotype	A reconstruction of the holotype maxilla along with additional referred skull material in white
Abdarainurus barsboldi	PIN 5669/1	Russian Academy of Sciences	Santonian	Alagteeg Formation, Mongolia	Caudal vertebrae		Diagram of the holotype material
Abditosaurus kuehnei	MCD 6718-6751	Conca Dellà Museum	Maastrichtian	Conquès Formation, Tremp Group, Spain	Vertebrae, a partial hip, limb elements, and teeth		
Abrosaurus dongpoensis	ZDM 5038	Zigong Dinosaur Museum	Bajocian	Lower Shaximiao Formation, Sichuan	A skull		Illustration of the holotype
Abydosaurus mcintoshi	DINO 16488	Dinosaur National Monument	Cenomanian	Mussentuchit Member, Cedar Mountain Formation, Utah	Skull with four cervical vertebrae		
Adamantisaurus mezzalirai	MUGEO 1282, 1289, 1295	Valdemar Lefevre Museum	Campanian or possibly Maastrichtian	Adamantina Formation, São Paulo	Three vertebrae	Specimens were given unique numbers, but they collectively comprise a single holotype	
Adeopapposaurus mognai	PVSJ610	National University of San Juan	Uncertain, Early Jurassic (Hettangian to Toarcian)	Cañón del Colorado Formation, Cuyo	A skull and a mostly complete skeleton lacking the tail		Museum mount based on the holotype with missing material filled in
Aegyptosaurus baharijensis	1912VIII61	Destroyed, was last located at the Palaeontological Museum, Munich	Cenomanian	Bahariya Formation, Egypt	Three caudal vertebrae, partial scapula, and two limb bones	Holotype destroyed in WWII, multiple specimens have been referred, but no neotype has been designated	Reconstruction of the limb bones of the holotype
Aeolosaurus colhuehuapensis	UNPSJB-PV 959/1 to 959/27	National University of Patagonia San Juan Bosco	Campanian	Lago Colhué Huapí Formation, Patagonia	Numerous caudal vertebrae	Specimens were given unique numbers, but they collectively comprise a single holotype	
Aeolosaurus rionegrinus	MJG-R 1	Jorge Gerold Museum	Late Campanian	Angostura Colorada Formation, Patagonia	Several caudal vertebrae and limb elements	Type species of Aeolosaurus as well as of the tribe "Aeolosaurini"	
Aepisaurus elephantinus	BED01	University of Montpellier	Albian	Mont Ventoux Formation, France	A humerus	Part of the humerus has been lost, but a cast of the original complete bone is housed in the Muséum national d'Histoire naturelle	A cast of the partially lost holotype on display
Aetonyx palustris	Syntypes: SAM 2768-2770	Iziko South African Museum	Pliensbachian	Upper Elliot Formation	A few martial vertebrae, most of one arm, a shoulder, tibia, and several foot bones	Subjective junior synonym of Massospondylus	
Agnosphytis cromhallensis	VMNH 1745	Virginia Museum of Natural History	Rhaetian	Magnesian Conglomerate, England	Partial hip	Classification is uncertain, might be a theropod, a sauropodomorph, or a silesaurid	
Agrosaurus macgillivrayi	BMNH 49984	Natural History Museum, London	Uncertain, possibly Rhaetian	Uncertain, possibly Magnesian Conglomerate, England	Partial limb bones	Originally reported from to be from Queensland, but later testing showed it was probably from England	
Agustinia ligabuei	MCF-PVPH-110	Bernardino Rivadavia Natural Sciences Argentine Museum	Albian	Lohan Cura Formation, Patagonia	Vertebrae and hip fragments with numerous hind limb elements	Considered a nomen dubium by some	
Ahvaytum bahndooiveche	UWGM 1975	University of Wyoming Geological Museum	Carnian	Popo Agie Formation, Wyoming	An astragalus	Part of a femur and humerus was also referred to this taxon, but not included in the holotype; taxon might be a sauropodomorph or another kind of basal saurischian	
Alamosaurus sanjuanensis	Holotype: USNM 10486 Paratype: USNM 10487	Smithsonian Institution	Maastrichtian	Ojo Alamo Formation, New Mexico	Holotype: Shoulder Paratype: Partial hip		The holotype and paratype
Algoasaurus bauri	AMNH FR 5631	American Museum of Natural History	Hauterivian	Upper Kirkwood Formation, South Africa	Partial femur, vertebra, and shoulder		Illustration of the holotype material
Aliwalia rex	NMW 1886-XV-39, 1876-VII-B124	Natural History Museum, Vienna	Norian	Lower Elliot Formation, South Africa	Fragmentary femur	Described as a giant herrerasaurid, but is now believed to be a junior synonym of Eucnemesaurus and the original description, which included a maxilla, was a chimera	
Alwalkeria maleriensis	ISI R306	Indian Statistical Institute	Carnian	Lower Maleri Formation, India	Partial skull, several vertebrae, a femur, and an astragalus	Has been variously classified as a theropod, a sauropodomorph, and a basal saurischian, the holotype may also be a chimera	Holotype elements individually labeled
Amanzia greppini	Syntypes: NMB M.H. 239, 245–246, 252–254, 258–260, 262, 264–271, 275–280, 282, 284–286, 291, 297, 300, 306, 324, 332, 339–342, 344–347, 349, 353–355, 358–359, 368–370, 372–374, 386-387	Natural History Museum Basel	Kimmeridgian	Reuchenette Formation, Switzerland	Numerous vertebrae and partial limb bones	Originally named as a species of Cetiosauriscus before being referred to Ornithopsis and then being given its own genus	Hypothetical skeletal reconstruction with the type material in blue
Amargasaurus cazaui	MACN-N 15	Bernardino Rivadavia Natural Sciences Argentine Museum	Barremian	La Amarga Formation, Patagonia	Partial skull, mostly articulated vertebra, partial hip, and limb fragments		Hypothetical skeletal reconstruction with the holotype shown in white
Amargatitanis macni	MACN PV N53	Bernardino Rivadavia Natural Sciences Argentine Museum	Barremian	La Amarga Formation, Patagonia	Mostly complete hind limb with a partial hip and fragmentary vertebrae	Originally had 3 syntypes (including MACM PV N34 and MACN PV N51), but these were later discovered to be from a different locality, so they were discarded as type specimens	Diagram of the holotype material
Amazonsaurus maranhensis	MN 4555-V, 4556, 4558–60, 4562, 4564; UFRJ-DG 58-R/1-7	Federal University of Rio de Janeiro	Aptian/Albian boundary	Itapecuru Formation, Maranhão	Partial hip, femur, and numerous vertebral fragments	Specimens were given unique numbers, but they collectively comprise a single holotype	Diagram of the holotype material
Ammosaurus major	YPM 208	Yale Peabody Museum	Hettangian	Portland Formation, Connecticut	Postcranial elements	Subjective junior synonym of Anchisaurus	
Ammosaurus solus	YPM 209	Yale Peabody Museum	Hettangian	Portland Formation, Connecticut	Partial skeleton including the skull	Subjective junior synonym of Anchisaurus	
Ampelosaurus atacis	MDE C3-247	Dinosauria	Early Maastrichtian	Marnes Rouges Inférieures Formation, France	Three articulated vertebrae		
Amphicoelias altus	AMNH 5764	American Museum of Natural History	Tithonian	Upper Morrison Formation, Colorado	Two vertebrae, a partial hip and shoulder, limb fragments, and teeth		The holotype vertebrae from multiple views
Amphicoelias latus	AMNH 5765	American Museum of Natural History	Tithonian	Upper Morrison Formation, Colorado	Four caudal vertebrae	Subjective junior synonym of Camarasaurus	
Amygdalodon patagonicus	Holotype: MLP 46-VIII-21-1; Lectotype: MLP 46-VIII-21-112	La Plata Museum	Toarcian	Cerro Carnerero Formation, Patagonia	Partial shoulder and hip with several vertebrae, ribs, and teeth	Considered a true sauropod by Pol et al. (2022)	Holotype elements laid out individually
Analong chuanjieensis	LFGT LCD 9701–1	Lufeng Dinosaur Museum	Bajocian	Chuanjie Formation, Yunnan	Partial postcranial skeleton	Originally assigned to Chuanjiesaurus before being given its own genus	
Anchisaurus polyzelus	Holotype: AM 41/109 Neotype: YPM 1883	Holotype: Beneski Museum of Natural History Neotype: Peabody Museum of Natural History	Hettangian	Portland Formation, Massachusetts	Neotype: vertebrae, a partial shoulder and hips, a fore arm, and a hind limb	Type species of Anchisaurus as well as of the clade "Anchisauria"; originally named Megadactylus before being referred to Amphisaurus and finally to Anchisaurus after both former genera were discovered to be preoccupied; A. colurus is an objective junior synonym	An illustration of the skeleton by O.C. Marsh
Andesaurus delgadoi	MUCPv 132	National University of Comahue	Cenomanian	Candeleros Formation, Patagonia	Numerous vertebrae, femur, humerus, a partial hip, and other limb fragments		
Angolatitan adamastor	MGUAN-PA-003	Agostinho Neto University	Coniacian	Tadi Beds, Itombe Formation, Angola	Ulna and radius		
Anhuilong diboensis	AGB 5822	Shexian Museum	Middle Jurassic (precise age not specified)	Hongqin Formation, Anhui	Mostly complete forelimb		Diagram of the holotype material
Antarctosaurus brasiliensis	GP-RD-2, 3, and 4	University of São Paulo	Uncertain, possibly Campanian to Maastrichtian, but possibly older	Adamantina Formation, São Paulo	Partial femur, humerus, and vertebra	Possibly a nomen dubium, or may belong to its own genus	
Antarctosaurus giganteus	MLP 26-316	La Plata Museum	Coniacian or Santonian	Plottier Formation, Patagonia	Both femora, fragments of the tibia, ribs, and vertebrae with other unidentified fragments	Some believe it represents a new genus; some regard it as a nomen dubium	The holotype elements on display
Antarctosaurus jaxarticus	Not catalogued	Unknown	Santonian	Syuksyuk Formation, Kazakhstan	A femur	May represent a distinct genus; may be a nomen nudum	
Antarctosaurus wichmannianus	Syntypes: MACN 6904	Bernardino Rivadavia Natural Sciences Argentine Museum	Early Campanian	Anacleto Formation, Patagonia	A hind limb, mostly complete fore limb, hip fragments, several vertebrae, and skull elements	Type species of Antarctosaurus, the type series is not confidently assigned to a single individual	Skeletal diagram of them holotype with unknown elements in grey
Antetonitrus ingenipes	BP/1/4952	Evolutionary Studies Institute	Hettangian	Upper Elliot Formation, South Africa	Partial hind limb, fore limb, hip and shoulder fragments, and a few vertebrae		The holotype material on a traveling display in Japan with a hypothetical reconstruction of the rest of the skeleton
Apatosaurus ajax	YPM 1860	Peabody Museum of Natural History	Kimmeridgian	Brushy Basin Member, Morrison Formation, Colorado	Partial hip	Type species of Apatosaurus as well as of the subfamily "Apatosaurinae"	Lateral view of the holotype hip bones
Apatosaurus laticollis	YPM 1861	Peabody Museum of Natural History	Kimmeridgian	Brushy Basin Member, Morrison Formation, Colorado	Several vertebrae	Subjective junior synonym of A. louisiae	
Apatosaurus louisae	CM 3018	Carnegie Museum of Natural History	Tithonian	Brushy Basin Member, Morrison Formation, Utah	Mostly complete skeleton lacking the skull	CM 11162 is a skull found near the holotype and may have belonged to the same animal	The holotype on display in Philadelphia
Apatosaurus minimus	AMNH 675	American Museum of Natural History	Tithonian	Morrison Formation, Wyoming	A set of vertebrae	Has been variously found to be a species of Apatosaurus, an indeterminate diplodocoid, and a macronarian	
Arackar licanantay	SNGM-1	Chilean National Museum of Natural History	Campanian or Maastrichtian	Hornitos Formation, Chile	Several vertebrae, a humerus, femur, and partial hip		Some of the holotype elements on display with a plastic model of the animal
Aragosaurus ischiaticus	"IG specimen" and "ZH specimen"	Teruel Provincial Museum (IG specimen) and Galve Paleontological Museum (ZH specimen)	Kimmeridgian	Villar del Arzobispo Formation, Spain	Fragmentary vertebrae, ribs, and hips with shoulder, humerus, and foot elements	The holotype was partially collected by paleontologists and partially by private collectors; the specimen is now housed in two different museums	
Archaeodontosaurus descouensi	MHNDPal 2003-396	Toulouse Natural History Museum	Bathonian	Isalo III Formation, Madagascar	Partial jaw with teeth		The holotype jaw shown from multiple views
Arcusaurus pereriabdalorum	BP/1/6235	Evolutionary Studies Institute	Pliensbachian	Upper Elliot Formation, South Africa	Partial skull	Limb, hip, and vertebral material is known from the same locality, but it is not known if these are from the same animal as the holotype	
Ardetosaurus viator	MAB011899 (formerly SMA 0013)	Oertijdmuseum in Boxtel	Kimmeridgian	Morrison Formation, Wyoming	An articulated vertebral series, several hip bones, most of a hindlimb, a coracoid, and several ribs	Specimen is nicknamed "Brösmeli"	
Argentinosaurus huinculensis	MCF-PVPH 1	Carmen Funes Municipal Museum	Cenomanian	Huincul Formation, Patagonia	Several dorsal vertebrae, a partial hip, and a fibula		Known bones from Argentinosaurus with the holotype elements in white
Argyrosaurus superbus	MLP 77-V-29-1	La Plata Museum	Campanian	Lago Colhué Huapí Formation, Patagonia	Complete fore limb		The holotype limb shown from multiple views
Arkharavia heterocoelica	AEIM no. 2/418	Amur Natural History Museum	Late Maastrichtian	Udurchukan Formation, Amur	A set of vertebrae		
Arrudatitan maximus	MPMA 12-0001-97	Monte Alto Museum of Paleontology	Late Campanian	Adamantina Formation, Bauru Group, São Paulo	Femora and partial hip with fragmentary rib, shoulder, and vertebral elements	Originally described as a new species of Aeolosaurus before being given its own genus	The holotype femur on display
Asiatosaurus kwangshiensis	IVPP V4794	Institute of Vertebrate Paleontology and Paleoanthropology	Aptian	Xinlong Formation, Guangxi	A tooth, three cervical vertebrae, and rib fragments		
Asiatosaurus mongoliensis	AMNH 6264	American Museum of Natural History	Uncertain, Early Cretaceous	Öösh Formation, Mongolia	A tooth	Generally considered a nomen dubium	The holotype tooth shown from multiple views
Astrodon johnstoni	YPM 798	Peabody Museum of Natural History	Albian	Arundel Formation, Maryland	A tooth	Official dinosaur of the state of Maryland; generally considered a nomen dubium	The holotype tooth shown from multiple views
Astrophocaudia slaughteri	SMU 61732 and 203/73655	Southern Methodist University	Albian	Paluxy Formation, Texas	Numerous vertebrae and ribs, a partial shoulder, and a tooth	Originally referred to Pleurocoelus before being given its own genus; specimens were given unique numbers, but they collectively comprise a single holotype	
Asylosaurus yalensis	YPM 2195	Yale Peabody Museum	Rhaetian	Magnesian Conglomerate, England	Partial torso including vertebrae, ribs, and hip bones with elements of the forelimb		
Atacamatitan chilensis	SGO-PV-961	Chilean National Museum of Natural History	Uncertain, Late Cretaceous	Tolar Formation, Chile	Vertebra fragments, a partial shoulder, and a femur		The holotype elements individually laid out
Atlantosaurus immanis	YPM 1840	Peabody Museum of Natural History	Kimmeridgian	Morrison Formation, Colorado	Mostly complete hips and femur	Now considered a nomen dubium	An illustration of the holotype
Atlantosaurus montanus	YPM 1835	Peabody Museum of Natural History	Kimmeridgian	Morrison Formation, Colorado	Mostly complete hips	Type species of Atlantosaurus; was originally referred to the genus Titanosaurus; generally considered a nomen dubium or a junior synonym of Apatosaurus ajax	An illustration of the holotype
Atlasaurus imelakei	Not catalogued	Rabat Earth Sciences Museum	Bathonian	Guettioua Formation, Morocco	Mostly complete skeleton		The holotype on display in Morocco
Atsinganosaurus velauciensis	VBN.93.01.a-d	University of Poitiers	Late Campanian	Argiles et Grès à Reptiles Formation, France	Several vertebrae		One of the vertebra from the holotype
Australodocus bohetii	Holotype: HMN MB.R.2455 [G 70] Paratype: MB.R.2454 [G 69]	Natural History Museum, Berlin	Tithonian	Upper Dinosaur Member, Tendaguru Formation, Tanzania	Two vertebrae	The type series was described as a set of four vertebrae, but two were destroyed in WWII	Holotype vertebra on display
Australotitan cooperensis	EMF102	Eromanga Natural History Museum	Late Cenomanian	Winton Formation, Queensland	Mostly complete hips and fore limbs	Specimen is nicknamed "Cooper"; possible junior synonym of Diamantinasaurus	Diagram of the holotype elements
Austroposeidon magnificus	MCT 1628-R	Earth Sciences Museum	Late Campanian	Presidente Prudente Formation, São Paulo	Several cervical, dorsal, and sacral vertebrae with one rib		One of the holotype vertebra from multiple views
Austrosaurus mckillopi	QM F2361	Queensland Museum	Albian	Allaru Formation, Queensland	Vertebrae and rib fragments		One of the vertebra from the holotype
Baalsaurus mansillai	MUCPv-1460	National University of Comahue	Turonian or Coniacian	Portezuelo Formation, Patagonia	Partial jawbone		The jaw of the holotype (top)
Bagualia alba	MPEF-PV 3301	Museum of Paleontology Egidio Feruglio	Toarcian	Cañadón Asfalto Formation, Patagonia	A partial skull with seven articulated vertebrae		Skeletal diagram of all known remains including the holotype
Bagualosaurus agudoensis	UFRGS-PV-1099-T	Universidade Federal do Rio Grande do Sul	Carnian	Candelária Formation, Rio Grande do Sul	Partial skull and jaw, several vertebrae, and mostly complete hind limbs with hips		Diagram of the holotype material with unknown elements in dark grey
Bajadasaurus pronuspinax	MMCh-PV 75	Ernesto Bachmann Paleontological Museum	Late Berriasian or Valanginian	Bajada Colorada Formation, Patagonia	Partial skull with jower jaw and several neck vertebrae		Diagram showing each of the bones of the holotype individually
Baotianmansaurus henanensis	41H III-0200	Henan Geological Museum	Turonian	Gaogou Formation, Henan	Several vertebrae, ribs, and parts of the shoulder bones		The holotype on display in China
Barapasaurus tagorei	ISI R 50	Indian Statistical Institute	Uncertain, early Jurassic	Lower Kota Formation, India	A sacrum	More than 300 bones from at least 6 individuals were found in association, but only a single sacrum was chosen as the holotype	
Barosaurus affinis	YPM 412	Peabody Museum of Natural History	Kimmeridgian	Morrison Formation, South Dakota	Two metatarsals	Generally considered a junior synonym of B. lentus	
Barosaurus lentus	YPM 429	Peabody Museum of Natural History	Kimmeridgian	Morrison Formation, South Dakota	Several vertebrae, ribs, and limb bones	Type species of Barosaurus, only six caudal vertebrae belonged to the original holotype, but more remains were excavated and assigned to the same specimen	An illustration of some of the vertebrae from the original holotype by O.C. Marsh
Barrosasaurus casamiquelai	MCF-PVPH-447/1-3	Carmen Funes Municipal Museum	Early Campanian	Anacleto Formation, Patagonia	Three dorsal vertebrae		Two of the holotype vertebrae
Bashunosaurus kaijiangensis	Holotype: KM 20100 Paratype: KM 20103	Chongqing Museum of Natural History	Callovian	Lower Member, Shaximiao Formation, Sichuan	Holotype: 14 vertebrae, a partial shoulder and hip, and a humerus, ulna, femur, tibia, and fibula Paratype: a partial hip bone	Genus was originally named as a nomen nudum in 1989 before being given a formal description in 2004	
Baurutitan britoi	MCT 1490-R	Earth Sciences Museum	Maastrichtian	Serra da Galga Formation, Minas Gerais	19 caudal vertebrae		Several of the type vertebrae
Bellusaurus sui	IVPP V.8299	Institute of Vertebrate Paleontology and Paleoanthropology	Oxfordian	Shishugou Formation, Xinjiang	A partial maxilla and another skull fragment		A reconstruction of the holotype material (in blue)
Blikanasaurus cromptoni	SAM K403	Iziko South African Museum	Norian or Rhaetian	Lower Elliot Formation, South Africa	Partial hind limbs	Type and only species of the family "Blikanosauridae"	
Bonatitan reigi	MACN-PV RN 821	Bernardino Rivadavia Natural Sciences Argentine Museum	Late Campanian	Lower Member, Allen Formation, Patagonia	A partial brain case	Holotype originally included a vertebra and limb bones, but these were later determined to be from a different individual	
Bonitasaura salagadoi	MPCA 300	Carlos Ameghino Provincial Museum	Santonian	Bajo de la Carpa Formation, Patagonia	Skull and jaw fragments with 20 vertebrae and numerous ribs, a humerus, radius, femur, tibia, and several ankle bones		The jaw material of te holotype
Borealosaurus wimani	LPM 0167	Liaoning Paleontological Museum	Late Albian	Sunjiawan Formation, Liaoning	Caudal vertebrae, a humerus, and a tooth		
Bothriospondylus elongatus	NHMUK R.2239	Natural History Museum, London	Berriasian or Valanginian	Wealden Group	One vertebrae	The specimen was originally part of the type series of Ornithopsis hulkei before being moved to the genus, may be a nomen dubium	
Bothriospondylus madagascariensis	NHMUK R.2598	Natural History Museum, London	Bathonian	Isalo III Formation, Madagascar	Dorsal centrum	Nomen dubium	
Bothriospondylus suffossus	NHMUK R.44592-5	Natural History Museum, London	Kimmeridgian	Kimmeridge Clay, England	Four dorsal vertebrae	Type species of Bothriospondylus, may be a nomen dubium	An illustration of the holotype
Brachiosaurus altithorax	FMNH P25107	Field Museum of Natural History	Kimmeridgian	Brushy Basin Member, Morrison Formation, Colorado	Several vertebrae, the hips, a femur, a humerus, and a rib	Type species of Brachiosaurus and of the family "Brachiosauridae"; has at least once been referred to. thegenus Astrodon, although this is not widely accepted	A diagram of all known specimens, with the holotype in white
Brachiosaurus fraasi	Not catalogued	Natural History Museum, Berlin	Kimmeridgian	Tendaguru Formation, Tanzania	A scapula and a humerus		
Brachiosaurus nougaredi		Now lost, was last housed at the National Museum of Natural History, France	Either the Late Jurassic or the Early Cretaceous	Possibly the Taouratine Series, Algeria or the Kem Kem Group, Morocco	A partial sacrum	More bones were discovered with the holotype, but were not collected; may belong to a new genus	A reconstruction of the lost holotype, with known elements in blue
Brachytrachelopan mesai	MPEF-PV 1716	Museum of Paleontology Egidio Feruglio	Uncertain, Late Jurassic (Oxfordian to Tithonian)	Cañadón Calcáreo Formation, Patagonia	Most of the cervical and dorsal vertebrae with ribs, the hips, and a partial femur and tibia		A restoration of the whole skeleton based on the holotype
Brasilotitan nemophagus	MPM 125R	Regional Provincial Museum of Father Jesus Molina	Late Campanian	Adamantina Formation, Bauru Group, São Paulo	A jawbone, two vertebrae, a toe, and hip fragments		
Bravasaurus arrierosorum	Holotype: CRILAR-Pv 612 Paratype: CRILAR-Pv 613	National University of La Rioja	Campanian	Ciénaga del Río Huaco Formation, Argentine Northwest	Holotype: skull fragments, 12 vertebrae, several ribs, fragmentary arm bones, a partial hip, a femur, and both fibulae Paratype: a partial hip, a rib, a femur, and a tooth		
Brontomerus mcintoshi	OMNH 66430	Sam Noble Oklahoma Museum of Natural History	Aptian	Ruby Ranch Member, Cedar Mountain Formation, Utah	A partial left ilium	More material was found associated with the holotype, believed to belong to two individuals, but only one bone was chosen as the holotype	A photo of the holotype
Brontosaurus amplus	YPM 1981	Peabody Museum of Natural History	Kimmeridgian	Morrison Formation, Wyoming	Mostly complete skeleton lacking the skull	Generally considered a junior synonym of B. excelsus (A. excelsus until recently)	
Brontosaurus excelsus	YPM 1980	Peabody Museum of Natural History	Kimmeridgian	Brushy Basin Member, Morrison Formation, Wyoming	Mostly complete skeleton lacking the skull	Type species of Brontosaurus, later referred to Apatosaurus before the Brontosaurus genus was resurrected	The holotype on display at the Yale Peabody Museum
Brontosaurus parvus	CM 566	Carnegie Museum of Natural History	Kimmeridgian	Lake Como Member, Morrison Formation, Wyoming	Mostly complete skeleton lacking the skull, feet, and the end of the tail	Originally named Elosaurus before being referred to Apatosaurus and later Brontosaurus	
Brontosaurus yahnahpin	TATE-001	Casper College	Kimmeridgian	Lake Como Member, Morrison Formation, Wyoming	Mostly complete skeleton	Originally referred to the genus Apatosaurus and then to Eobrontosaurus before being referred to Brontosaurus	
Bruhathkayosaurus matleyi	GSI PAL/SR/20	Now destroyed, was last held in the collections at the Geological Survey of India	Maastrichtian	Kallamedu Formation, India	Hip fragments and partial leg bones	Originally misclassified as a theropod before being recognized as a sauropod but was later thought to be a misidentified tree trunk; it has been re-identified as a sauropod in recent publications due to the emergence of new photos of the holotype before it was destroyed	
Buriolestes schultzi	ULBRA-PVT280	Universidade Luterana do Brasil	Carnian	Santa Maria Formation, Rio Grande do Sul	Partial skeleton with mostly complete skull, limbs, and vertebrae		The holotype in situ
Bustingorrytitan shiva	MMCH-Pv 59/1-40	Ernesto Bachmann Paleontological Museum	Cenomanian	Huincul Formation, Patagonia	Several vertebrae, a scapula and humerus, three leg bones, a tooth, and other fragments	The unidentified fragments of the holotype have been tentatively identified as ribs	A diagram including the forelimb bones of the holotype
Caieiria allocaudata	MCT 1719-R	Earth Sciences Museum	Maastrichtian	Serra da Galga Formation, Minas Gerais	Ten caudal vertebrae	Originally erected as the paratype of Trigonosaurus before being made the holotype of a new genus	The vertebrae of the holotype arrayed and shown from multiple views
Camarasaurus annae	CM 8942	Carnegie Museum of Natural History	Tithonian	Morrison Formation, Utah	A dorsal vertebra	Probable junior synonym of C. lentus	
Camarasaurus grandis	Holotype: YPM 1901 Paratypes: YPM 1903, 1905	Peabody Museum of Natural History	Kimmeridgian	Brushy Basin Member, Morrison Formation, Wyoming	Holotype: mostly complete skeleton lacking the skull Paratypes: hips, a femur, shoulder bones, and numerous vertebrae	Some authors consider YPM 1900 (the holotype of Morosaurus impar) as one of the paratypes of C. grandis	
Camarasaurus lentus	YPM 1910	Peabody Museum of Natural History	Kimeridgian	Lake Como Member, Morrison Formation, Wyoming	Mostly complete skeleton lacking parts of the skull and several limb bones		
Camarasaurus leptodirus	AMNH 5769	American Museum of Natural History	Tithonian	Brushy Basin Member, Morrison Formation, Colorado	3 cervical vertebrae	Probable junior synonym of C. supremus	
Camarasaurus lewisi	BYU 9047	BYU Museum of Paleontology	Kimmeridgian	Brushy Basin Member, Morrison Formation, Colorado	Most of the vertebra and hips with a femur, radius, ulna, and several foot bones	Originally given the genus Cathetosaurus before being referred to Camarasaurus, some authors still consider it a distinct genus	A photo of the sacrum from the holotype
Camarasaurus robustus	YPM 1902	Peabody Museum of Natural History	Kimmeridgian	Brushy Basin Member, Morrison Formation, Wyoming	Partial hip bone	First named as a species of Morosaurus before being moved to Camarasaurus; now considered a junior synonym of C. grandis	
Camarasaurus supremus	Holotype: AMNH 5760 Topotype: AMNH 5761	American Museum of Natural History	Kimmeridgian	Brushy Basin Member, Morrison Formation, Colorado	A composite skeleton from at least two individuals, including almost every bone	Type species of Camarasaurus and of the family "Camarasauridae" and the clade "Camarasauromorpha"	The bones of the holotype in situ during excavation
Camelotia borealis	Syntypes: SAM 3449 and SAM 3450	Iziko South African Museum	Rhaetian or Hettangian	Westbury Formation, Penarth Group, England	Hind limb and hip bones with fragmentary vertebrae and ribs	It is not certain if the rocks the syntypes were taken from date to the late Triassic or very early Jurassic	An illustration of the femur from the type series
Campananeyen fragilissimus	MMCh-PV 71	Ernesto Bachmann Paleontological Museum	Lower Cenomanian	Candeleros Formation	The back of a skull, several vertebrae, hip bones, and foot bones		
Campylodoniscus ameghinoi	MACN A-IOR63	Bernardino Rivadavia Natural Sciences Argentine Museum	Cenomanian	Bajo Barreal Formation, Patagonia	Partial maxilla with associated teeth	Originally named Campylodon, but the genus was preoccupied by a fish; may be a nomen dubium	A speculative reconstruction of the skull, with known elements in light blue
Cardiodon rugulosus	Not catalogued	Now lost, was last kept at the Natural History Museum, London	Bathonian	Forest Marble Formation, England	A tooth	Sometimes referred to Cetiosaurus; the holotype has since been lost	
Cathartesaura anaerobica	MPCA 232	Carlos Ameghino Provincial Museum	Cenomanian to Coniacian	Huincul Formation, Patagonia	Five vertebrae, a shoulder and hip bone, and a femur, with other poorly-preserved fragments		A diagram of one of the vertebrae from the holotype
Caulodon diversidens	AMNH 5768	American Museum of Natural History	Exact age unknown, Kimmeridgian or Tithonian	Morrison Formation, Colorado	Eight teeth	Probable junior synonym of Camarasaurus supremus	An illustration of the holotype teeth
Caulodon leptoganus	AMNH 5769	American Museum of Natural History	Exact age unknown, Kimmeridgian or Tithonian	Morrison Formation, Colorado	Two teeth	Probable junior synonym of Camarasaurus supremusTwo teeth	
Cedarosaurus weiskopfae	DMNH 39045	Denver Museum of Nature and Science	Valanginian	Yellow Cat Member, Cedar Mountain Formation, Utah	Mostly complete skeleton lacking the head and neck	Originally referred to Pleurocoelus before being given its own genus	The bones of the holotype laid out next to its describers
Cetiosauriscus leedsi or C. leedsii	BMNH R1988	Natural History Museum, London	Callovian	Oxford Clay Formation, England (possibly Kellaways Formation)	Two hip bones	Possibly a nomen dubium; originally referred to Cetiosaurus before being given its own genus; formerly the type species of Cetiosauriscus before the ICZN changed this designation due to the incompleteness of the fossil compared to C. stewarti	
Cetiosauriscus stewarti	NHMUK R3078	Natural History Museum, London	Callovian	Peterborough Member, Oxford Clay Formation, England	Most of the hips, a leg, an arm, and the tail	Originally referred to Cetiosaurus before being given its own genus; new type species of Cetiosauriscus by ruling of the ICZN	An illustration of the holotype articulated
Cetiosaurus brachyurus	BMNH collections, not catalogued	May be lost, was last known to be at the Natural History Museum, London	Uncertain, Early Cretaceous	Hastings Beds, Wealden Group, England	Two partial vertebrae	Nomen dubium, material might be from an indeterminate sauropod or an Iguanodon	
Cetiosaurus brevis	BMNH 2544-2550	Natural History Museum, London	Valanginian	Hastings Beds, Wealden Group, England	Several caudal vertebrae	Type series originally contained more specimens, but these were later shown to belong to Iguanodon and were discarded; C. conybeari is an objective junior synonym of C. brevis, which may itself be a junior synonym of Pelorosaurus	
Cetiosaurus glymptonensis	OUMNH J13750-13758	Oxford University Museum of Natural History	Uncertain	Unknown, near Glympton	Nine caudal vertebrae	Was briefly referred to the genus Cetiosauriscus, but probably represents a distinct genus	
Cetiosaurus longus	Not catalogued	Unknown, believed to be in the collections of the Oxford University Museum of Natural History	Kimmeridgian	Portland Stone Formation, England	Two partial vertebrae	Generally considered a nomen dubium	An illustration of the holotype vertebrae before they were lost
Cetiosaurus medius	Syntypes: OUMNH J13693-13712, J13721, J13748, J13877	Oxford University Museum of Natural History	Uncertain	Uncertain, near Chipping Norton, England	11 tail vertebrae and several bones of the feet	Original type species of Cetiosaurus, but is now considered a nomen dubium	
Cetiosaurus mogrebensis	Syntypes: El Mers N°1-N°8	Not listed	Bathonian	El Mers Group, Morocco	Vertebrae and leg bones	Probably represents a distinct genus	
Cetiosaurus oxoniensis	Lectotype: OUMNH J13605-13613, 13615–13616, 13619–13688, 13899 Paralectotypes: OUMNH J13614, 13617–8, 13780–1, 13596	Oxford University Museum of Natural History	Bathonian	Forest Marble Formation, England	Lectotype: numerous vertebrae, shoulder elements, most of the hips, arms, and several leg bones Paralectotypes: partial shoulder, femur, humerus, a braincase, and several bones from a small individual	New type species of Cetiosaurus and of the family "Cetiosauridae"	Some of the type material on display
Chebsaurus algeriensis	D001-01 to 78	Research & Development Center of Sonatrach	Callovian	Aïssa Formation, Algeria	Vertebrae, a partial shoulder, limb bones, a partial skull, and several teeth		
Chiayusaurus asianensis	KPE 8001	Kyungpook National University Museum	Aptian-Albian	Hasandong Formation, South Korea	A tooth	May be a nomen dubium	
Chiayusaurus lacustris	Not catalogued	Institute of Vertebrate Paleontology and Paleoanthropology	Barremian	Xinminbao Group, Gansu	A tooth	Type species of Chiayusaurus; originally named as "Chiayüsaurus", but the ICZN does not permit special characters; may be a nomen dubium	
Chinshakiangosaurus chunghoensis	IVPP V14474	Institute of Vertebrate Paleontology and Paleoanthropology	Pliensbachian	Fengjiahe Formation, Yunnan	Hind limbs, mostly complete hips and shoulders with numerous vertebrae and a jawbone		
Choconsaurus baileywillisi	MMCh-PV 44/10	Ernesto Bachmann Paleontological Museum	Cenomanian	Huincul Formation, Patagonia	Numerous disarticulated vertebrae, a partial shoulder, scattered ribs, and the bones of a hand		
Chondrosteosaurus gigas	BMNH 46869	Natural History Museum, London	Hauterivian	Wessex Formation, Wealden Group, England	A partial vertebrae		Illustration of the holotype
Chromogisaurus novasi	PVSJ 845	Universidad Nacional de San Juan	Carnian	Cancha de Bochas Member, Ischigualasto Formation, Argentine Northwest	Hip and hind limb bones with fragmentary vertebrae		Diagram of the holotype material
Chuanjiesaurus anaensis	Lfch 1001	Lufeng World Dinosaur Valley	Bajocian	Chuanjie Formation, Yunnan	A series of vertebrae, shoulder bones, several bones of the fore limb, and mostly complete hips and hind limbs	Additional material was originally included in the holotype, but these were later determined to belong to a second individual and were separated from the type specimen	
Chubutisaurus insignis	MACN 18.222	Bernardino Rivadavia Natural Sciences Argentine Museum	Albian	Cerro Barcino Formation, Patagonia	A femur, humerus, radius, scapula, tibia, vertebra, and hip elements, and bones of the feet		An illustration of the scapula from the holotype
Chucarosaurus diripienda	Holotype: MPCA PV 820 Paratype: MPCA PV 821	Carlos Ameghino Provincial Museum	Cenomanian	Huincul Formation, Patagonia	Holotype: several partial leg and hip bones Paratype: a partial tibia		Digital reconstruction of the holotype
Chuxiongosaurus lufengensis	CXM-LT9401	Chuxiong Prefectural Museum	Hettangian	Lower Lufeng Formation, Yunnan	Nearly complete skull missing lower jaw	Subjective junior synonym of Jingshanosaurus	
Clasmodosaurus spatula	Not catalogued	Personal collection of Florentino Ameghino	Cenomanian	Bajo Barreal Formation, Patagonia	Three fragmentary teeth	Was originally believed to be a carnosaur or a coelurosaur; considered a nomen dubium by some	
Coloradisaurus brevis	PVL 3967	National University of Tucumán	Norian	Los Colorados Formation, Argentine Northwest	Mostly complete skull, more matieral awaiting description	Originally given the genus name Coloradia before this name was discovered to be occupied by a moth and it was renamed	Diagram of the holotype material with missing elements in dark grey
Comahuesaurus windhauseni	MOZ-PV 6722	Dr. Juan A. Olsacher Provincial Museum of Natural Sciences	Late Aptian	Lohan Cura Formation, Patagonia	Scattered vertebrae, a humerus, most of the hips, and other limb fragments		Digital reconstruction of the holotype material
Daanosaurus zhangi	ZDM 0193	Zigong Dinosaur Museum	Kimmeridgian	Upper Shaximiao Formation, Sichuan	A broken skull, 20+ vertebrae, a femur, and ribs	Holotype is believed to be a juvenile, no adult specimens known	
Dashanpusaurus dongi	Holotype: ZDM 5028 Paratype: ZDM 5027	Zigong Dinosaur Museum	Bajocian	Lower Shaximiao Formation, Sichuan	Holotype: most of the vertebrae, an ulna, femur, tibia, and partial hip Paratype: another series of vertebrae, a humerus, and a radius		
Datousaurus bashanensis	IVPP V.7262-7263	Zigong Dinosaur Museum	Bajocian	Lower Shaximiao Formation, Sichuan	A fragmentary skull with a mostly complete post-cranial skeleton		The skull from the holotype in situ
Daxiatitan binglingi	GSLTZP03-001	Geology and Mineral Resources Exploration Academy of Gansu	Barremian	Hekou Group, Gansu	22 vertebrae, a shoulder bone, and a femur, with rib fragments		A restored skeleton on display in Anhui, based on the holotype
Demandasaurus darwini	MDS−RVII	Salas de los Infantes Dinosaur Museum	Late Barremian	Castrillo de la Reina Formation, Spain	Skull and lower jaw fragments with teeth, 33 vertebrae, a partial hip, several ribs, and a femur		Digital reconstruction of the holotype material
Diamantinasaurus matildae	Holotype and paratypes: AODF 603	Australian Age of Dinosaurs	Cenomanian	Winton Formation, Queensland	Holotype: several fragmentary ribs, most of the arm bones, a mostly complete hip, and a single hind limb Paratypes: six vertebrae, a radius, and a finger bone	Type genus of the clade "Diamantinasauria"	Left and right lateral views of the type material
Dicraeosaurus hansemanni	"Skeleton m", no specimen number given	Natural History Museum, Berlin	Kimmeridgian	Middle Dinosaur Member, Tendaguru Formation, Tanzania	Mostly complete skeleton with a partial skull but lacking the front limbs	Type species of Dicraeosaurus as well as of the family "Dicraeosauridae" and the subfamily "Dicraeosaurinae"	A diagram of known material with the holotype in brown
Dicraeosaurus sattleri	"Skeleton M", no specimen number given	Natural History Museum, Berlin	Kimmeridgian	Midd;le Dinosaur Member, Tendaguru Formation, Tanzania	Partial vertebral series with complete hips and a femur		A diagram of known material with the holotype elements in red
Dinhierosaurus lourinhanensis	ML 414	Museu da Lourinhã	Tithonian	Praia da Amoreira-Porto Novo Member, Lourinhã Formation, Portugal	Seven dorsal vertebrae	More material was found associated with the holotype, but these were not included within the type specimen; originally assigned to the genus Lourinhasaurus before being given its own genus; subjective junior synonym of Supersaurus	A digital illustration of several of the holotype vertebrae
Dinodocus mackesoni	NHMUK 14695	Natural History Museum, London	Aptian or Albian	Lower Greensand Group, England	Shoulder and hip bones with a humerus, ulna, tibia, fibula, a partial femur, and several metatarsals	Originally described as a specimen of the pliosaurid Polyptychodon before being referred to Pelorosaurus and then being given its own genus; subjective junior synonym of Pelorosaurus; may be a nomen dubium	An illustration of the holotype humerus
Diplodocus carnegii	Holotype: CM 84 Paratype: CM 94	Carnegie Museum of Natural History	Kimmeridgian	Talking Rocks Member, Morrison Formation, Wyoming	Two mostly complete skeletons without skulls	Was proposed to be designated the new type species of Diplodocus, but this was rejected by the ICZN	A diagram of known material with the holotype elements in green and the paratype in yellow
Diplodocus hallorum	NMMNH P-3690	National Museum of Natural History, Paris	Kimmeridgian	Jackpile Sandstone Member, Morrison Formation, New Mexico	32 vertebrae, a partial hip, and several ribs	Originally named Seismosaurus halli, but the species name was changed to "hallorum" to be more grammatically correct; was once considered a junior synonym of Supersaurus, but was later referred to the genus Diplodocus	
Diplodocus lacustris	YPM 1922	Peabody Museum of Natural History	Kimmeridgian	Brushy Basin Member, Morrison Formation, Colorado	A lower jaw, a partial maxilla, and associated teeth	Nomen dubium, some have suggested that the type material may belong to Camarasaurus	
Diplodocus longus	YPM VP 1920	Peabody Museum of Natural History	Kimmeridgian	Brushy Basin Member, Morrison Formation, Colorado	Two complete vertebrae with other fragmentary elements	Type species of Diplodocus as well as of the superfamily "Diplodocoidea", the family "Diplodocidae", and the subfamily "Diplodocinae"; D. longus is considered by some to be dubious, although some regard it as valid; additional material was once considered part of the holotype, but it is uncertain if these bones are from the same individual	Illustration of the holotype by O.C. Marsh
Dongbeititan dongi	DNHM D2867	Dalian Natural History Museum	Barremian	Jianshangou Bed, Yixian Formation, Liaoning	Numerous vertebrae with a partial shoulder, hip, a complete hind limb, a femur, and a few ribs		
Dongyangosaurus sinensis	DYM 04888	Dongyang Museum	Cenomanian	Jinhua Formation, Zhejiang	A complete pelvis with several articulated vertebrae		The holotype on display
Dreadnoughtus schrani	Holotype: MPM-PV 1156 Paratype: MPM-PV 3546	Regional Provincial Museum of Father Jesus Molina	Campanian or Maastrichtian	Cerro Fortaleza Formation, Patagonia	Holotype: ostly complete skeleton lacking most of the neck and head Paratype: several vertebrae, ribs, a mostly complete pelvis, and a femur		Diagram of the material known from the holotype
Drusilasaura deseadensis	MPM-PV 2097/1 to 2097/19	Regional Provincial Museum of Father Jesus Molina	Uncertain, possibly Cenomanian or Turonian	Upper Member, Bajo Barreal Formation, Patagonia	Eleven vertebrae, a shoulder bone, and fragments of ribs		
Duriatitan humerocristatus	BMNH 44635	Natural History Museum, London	Kimmeridgian	Kimmeridge Clay, England	A humerus	Originally named as a new species of Cetiosaurus before being referred to its own genus	An illustration of the holotype shown from multiple views
Dyslocosaurus polyonychius	AC 663	Beneski Museum of Natural History	Kimmeridgian	Morrison Formation, Wyoming	A complete fore limb and hind limb	Was originally believed to be from the Maastrichtian-aged Lance Formation or the Early Cretaceous Cloverly Formation; holotype may be a chimera including toe bones from a theropod	The holotype on display in Amherst
Dystrophaeus viaemalae	USNM 2364	Smithsonian Institution	Oxfordian	Tidwell Member, Morrison Formation, Wyoming	A partial vertebra and shoulder with an ulna, radius, and three metacarpals	Additional material has been recovered from the same locality as the holotype, considered a nomen dubium by some authors	The bones of the holotype laid out individually
Dystylosaurus edwini	BYU 5750	BYU Museum of Paleontology	Kimmeridgian	Brushy Basin Member, Morrison Formation, Colorado	A set of dorsal vertebrae	Now widely considered a junior synonym of Supersaurus	
Dzharatitanis kingi	USNM 538127	Smithsonian Institution	Turonian	Bissekty Formation, Uzbekistan	A caudal vertebra		The holotype vertebra shown from multiple views
Efraasia minor	SMNS 11838	Stuttgart State Museum of Natural History	Norian	Stubensandstein Member, Lower Löwenstein Formation, Germany	Partial hip, a hind limb, and a few vertebrae	Originally described as a species of the pseudosuchian Teratosaurus before being moved to the genus Sellosaurus and then Palaeosaurus until the new genus "Efraasia" was created	
Elaltitan lilloi	PVL 4628, MACN-CH 217	National University of Tucumán and Bernardino Rivadavia Natural Sciences Argentine Museum	Late Cenomanian or Turonian	Lower Bajo Barreal Formation, Patagonia	Vertebrae, mostly complete fore limbs, a shoulder, partial hip, and hind limb elements		An illustration of the holotype with known elements in blue
Eomamenchisaurus yuanmouensis	CXMVZA 165	Chuxiong Prefectural Museum	Uncertain, middle Jurassic	Zhanghe Formation, Yunnan	Mostly complete hips, a femur, and a tibia		
Eoraptor lunensis	PVSJ 512	Universidad Nacional de San Juan	Carnian	Cancha de Bochas Member, Ischigualasto Formation, Argentine Northwest	Mostly complete articulated skeleton	Has been variously classified as a sauropodomorph, a theropod, and a basal saurischian; the most recent analyses repeatedly suggest it is an early sauropodomorph	Holotype specimen on display in San Juan, Argentina
Epachthosaurus sciuttoi	Holotype: MACN-CH 1317 Paratype: MACN-CH 18689	Bernardino Rivadavia Natural Sciences Argentine Museum	Turonian	Bajo Barreal Formation, Patagonia	Holotype: one vertebra Paratype: partial hip and several more vertebrae	Originally referred to Antarctosaurus and then to Argyrosaurus before being given its own genus	
Erketu ellisoni	IGM 100/1803	Mongolian Academy of Sciences	Uncertain (Cenomanian to Coniacian?)	Bayan Shireh Formation, Mongolia	Numerous cervical vertebrae		Diagram of the holotype material with unknown material in gray
Eucamerotus foxi	NHMUK R.2522	Natural History Museum, London	Barremian	Wessex Formation, England	Single fragmentary vertebra	Was originally not given a species name, has been synonymized with Ornithopsis and Pelorosaurus, but subsequent authors consider it a valid genus	
Eucnemesaurus entaxonis	BP/1/6234	Evolutionary Studies Institute	Norian	Lower Elliot Formation, South Africa	Vertebrae, a partial hip, and a mostly complete hind limb		
Eucnemesaurus fortis	TrM 119	Transvaal Museum	Norian	Lower Elliot Formation, South Africa	A partial hip, a few vertebrae, and several limb elements	Type species of Eucnemesaurus	An illustration of one of the holotype limb bones
Euhelopus zdanskyi	PMU 24705	Museum of Evolution of Uppsala University	Berriasian or Valanginian	Meng-Yin Formation, Shandong	Numerous vertebrae, a femur, and a partial skull including lower jaw	Type species of the family "Euhelopodidae"	CT scans of the holotype skull from multiple views
Europasaurus eastwoodi	DFMMh/FV 291	Dinosaur Park Münchehagen	Kimmeridgian	Süntel Formation, Germany	Disarticulated skull with numerous teeth, vertebrae, and ribs	Part of the holotype was destroyed before it was formally described	Two vertebrae of the holotype shown mid-preparation
Euskelosaurus africanus	SAM 3608	Iziko South African Museum	Norian	Lower Elliot Formation, South Africa	A partial hip	Generally considered a nomen dubium	
Euskelosaurus browni or E. bornwii	BMNH R1625	Natural History Museum, London	Norian	Lower Elliot Formation, South Africa	Fragmentary vertebra, leg bones, and a partial hip	Type species of Euskelosaurus; may be a nomen dubium or a junior synonym of Plateosauravus; has also been spelled "Euskelesaurus" by some authors	
Ferganasaurus verzilini	PIN N 3042/1	Russian Academy of Sciences	Callovian	Balabansai Formation, Kyrgyzstan	Several vertebrae with hip and limb bones		
Fukuititan nipponensis	FPDM-V8468	Fukui Prefectural Dinosaur Museum	Aptian	Kitadani Formation, Japan	Mostly complete shoulder, fore limb, and hind limb, with vertebral fragments		The disarticulated holotype material on display in Japan
Fulengia youngi	CUP 2037	Fu Jen Catholic University	Early Jurassic	Lufeng Formation, Yunnan	A skull, a vertebra, and some unidentified fragments	Subjective junior synonym of Lufengosaurus; originally believed to be aa lizard before later being recognized as a juvenile sauropodomorph	
Fushanosaurus qitaiensis	FH000101	Fushan Museum	Oxfordian	Shishugou Formation, Xinjiang	A femur		
Futalognkosaurus dukei	MUCPv-323	National University of Comahue	Turonian	Portezuelo Formation, Patagonia	Four disarticulated vertebrae and a mostly complete hip		Diagram of the holotype material with a human silhouette for scale
Galeamopus hayi	HMNS 175 (=CM 662)	Houston Museum of Natural Science	Kimmeridgian	Morrison Formation, Wyoming	Partial skeleton with preserved skull	Type species of Galeamopus, originally Diplodocus hayi	The holotype mounted in a museum display
Galeamopus pabsti	USNM V 2673 (=SMA 0011)	Aathal Dinosaur Museum	Kimmeridgian	Morrison Formation, Wyoming	Complete skull and most of the anterior half of the skeleton	Specimen nicknamed "Max"	The holotype skull on display
Galvesaurus herreroi or Galveosaurus herreroi	CLH-16	Galve Museum of Paleontology	Kimmeridgian	Villar del Arzobispo Formation, Spain	Several vertebrae		
Gandititan cavocaudatus	JXGM-F-V1	Jiangxi Geological Museum	Cenomanian or Turonian	Zhoutian Formation, Jiangxi	Numerous vertebrae, some ribs, and a partial hip		
Garrigatitan meridionalis	MMS / VBN.09.17	Velaux-La Bastide Neuve	Campanian	Argiles et Grès à Reptiles Formation, France	A vertebra, two humeri, and hip elements		
Garumbatitan morellensis	Holotype: SAV05-021, 023–031, 039–045, 048–050, 055, 060–071, SAV08-040, 100–104 Paratype: SAV05-013, 031a, 031b, 032–038, 046-047	Tremps Museum of Dinosaurs	Late Barremian	Arcillas de Morella Formation, Spain	Holotype: numerous articulated vertebrae, ribs, a partial shoulder, most of the hind limbs, and several hip bones Paratype: several ribs and two almost complete hind limbs	All bones of the holotype are believed to be from a single individual, the rest of the bones found at the locality form the paratype	
Gigantosaurus megalonyx	Syntypes: CAMSM J.29477 to J.29483	Sedgwick Museum of Earth Sciences	Kimmeridgian	Kimmeridge Clay Formation, England	Fragments of limb bones and vertebrae	Generally considered a nomen dubium, has been subsequently synonymized with Ornithopsis and Pelorosaurus	The type series
Gigantoscelus molengraaffi	TrM 65	Transvaal Museum	Hettangian or Sinemurian	Bushveld Sandstone, South Africa	Partial femur		
Giraffatitan brancai	Lectotype: MB.R.2180 Paralectotype: MB.R.2181	Natural History Museum, Berlin	Tithonian	Tendaguru Formation, Tanzania	Majority of the skeleton		The type specimens on display with missing elements filled in
Glacialisaurus hammeri	FMNH PR1823	Field Museum of Natural History	Pliensbachian	Hanson Formation, Antarctica	Partial ankle, foot, and femur		One of the feet from the holotype from multiple views
Gobititan shenzhouensis	IVPP 12579	Institute of Vertebrate Paleontology and Paleoanthropology	Aptian	Xiagou Formation, Xinminbao Group, Gansu	41 vertebrae and a mostly complete hind limb		
Gondwanatitan faustoi	MN 4111-V	National Museum of Brazil	Late Campanian	Adamantina Formation, São Paulo	Mostly complete skeleton		
Gonxianosaurus shibeiensis	Holotype and paratype: never catalogued, possibly lost	Sichuan Geological Survey	Toarcian	Dongyuemiao Member, Ziliujing Formation, Sichuan	Partial skull, several vertebrae, partial pelvis, ribs, and limb elements		
Gresslyosaurus ingens	NMB BM 1, 10, 24, 53, 530–1, 1521, 1572–74, 1576–78, 1582, 1584–85, 1591	Natural History Museum Bamberg	Sevatian (a.k.a. late Norian)	Knollenmergel Member, Trossingen Formation, Switzerland	Scattered postcranial elements including partial vertebrae, pedal elements, and long bone fragments	Type species of Gresslyosaurus, may belong to the genus Plateosaurus, originally named "Dinosaurus gresslyi", but a formal description never accompanied this name, so it remains a nomen nudum	The holotype on display
Gresslyosaurus plieningeri	SMNS 80664	State Museum of Natural History Stuttgart	Norian	Knollenmergel Member, Trossingen Formation, Germany		May belong to the genus Plateosaurus or Tuebingosaurus	
Gresslyosaurus robustus	GPIT-PV-6312	Institute of Geosciences, University of Tübingen	Rhaetian	Exter Formation, Germany	Partial leg and foot bones with fragments of vertebrae	May be a nomen dubium or belong to the genus Plateosaurus, several hip bones were described with the rest of the holotype, which have been lost	
Gryponyx africanus	SAM 3357-3359	Iziko South African Museum	Sinemurian	Upper Elliot Formation, South Africa	Most of the hips and hind limbs, both hands, and some vertebrae	Originally believed to be a theropod, but is now known to be a sauropodomorph; subjective junior synonym of Massospondylus	An illustration of some of the bones of the type series
Gryponyx taylori	SAM 3453	Iziko South African Museum	Sinemurian	Upper Elliot Formation, South Africa	A partial hip and associated vertebrae	Subjective junior synonym of Massospondylus	
Guaibasaurus candelariensis	Holotype: MCN PV2355 Paratype: MCN PV2356	Museum of Natural Sciences of the Zoobotanica Foundation of Rio Grande do Sul	Norian	Caturrita Formation, Rio Grande do Sul	Holotype: numerous partial vertebrae, 5 ribs, shoulder and hip elements, partial femora and other long bones, and most of both feet Paratype: a mostly complete articulated hind limb	Type species of the family "Guaibasauridae", has sometimes been suggested to be a theropod, but this is not the scientific consensus	Diagram of all known material, including the holotype
Gyposaurus capensis	SAM 990	Iziko South African Museum	Early Jurassic	Upper Elliot Formation, South Africa	Several vertebrae and ribs, shoulder and hip bones, a femur, fibula, and foot bones	Originally named as a species of Hortalotarsus before being given its own genus; has also been synonymized with Anchisaurus and Massospondylus by some authors	
Gyposaurus sinensis	IVPP V15	Geological Museum of China	Hettangian	Lufeng Formation, Yunnan	Jaw fragments and a mostly complete post-cranial skeleton	Originally named "Gripposaurus" in a publication, but this is a nomen nudum; subjective junior synonym of Lufengosaurus, but some researchers believe this taxon represents a distinct genus	The type series on display in Beijing
Haestasaurus becklesii	NHMUK R1870	Natural History Museum, London	Berriasian	Hastings Beds, Wealden Group, England	Mostly complete forelimb with skin impressions	Originally named as a species of Pelorosaurus before being given its own genus	One of the humeri from the holotype from multiple views
Hamititan xinjiangensis	HM V22	Hami Museum	Barremian or Aptian	Shengjinkou Formation, Xinjiang	Several caudal vertebrae		Diagram of the holotype material
Haplocanthosaurus delfsi	CMNH 10380	Cleveland Museum of Natural History	Kimmeridgian	Salt Wash Member, Morrison Formation, Colorado	Numerous vertebrae, limb bones, and ribs		
Haplocanthosaurus priscus	CM 572	Carnegie Museum of Natural History	Kimmeridgian	Brushy Basin Member, Morrison Formation, Colorado	Numerous vertebrae, ribs, a mostly complete hip, and isolated limb bones	Type species of Haplocanthosaurus, originally named Haplocanthus before it was discovered that that genus was preoccupied	Diagram of the holotype material in situ
Haplocanthosaurus utterbacki	CM 879/10380	Carnegie Museum of Natural History	Kimmeridgian	Brushy Basin Member, Morrison Formation, Colorado	Mostly complete skeleton	Sometimes considered a junior synonym of H. priscus	Diagram of the holotype material
Histriasaurus boscarollii	WN V-6	Zagreb Institute of Geology	Hatuverian	Unnamed formation, Istarska, Croatia	A set of vertebrae		One of the holotype vertebrae
Hortalotarsus skirtopodus	AM 455	Albany Museum, South Africa	Sinemurian	Clarens Formation, South Africa	A tibia, fibula, and several phalanges	Originally referred to the genus Thecodontosaurus before being given its own genus, may be a nomen dubium, many more bones were found associated with the holotype, but they were destroyed during excavation by a gunpowder explosion in an attempt to free the specimen from the rock	An illustration of the holotype elements with each bone labeled
Huabeisaurus allocotus	HBV-20001	Shijiazhuang University Museum	Campanian	Upper Member, Huiquanpu Formation, Shanxi	Numerous vertebrae and chevrons, ribs, a partial hip, and several limb elements		Diagram of the holotype elements in situ
Huanghetitan liujiaxiaensis	GSLTZP02-001	Gansu Geological Museum	Barremian	Upper Hekou Group, Gansu	Two caudal vertebrae and a mostly complete hip with shoulder and rib fragments	Type species of Huanghetitan	
Huanghetitan ruyangensis	41HIII-0001	Henan Geological Museum	Aptian or Albian	Haoling Formation, Henan	Articulated vertebral segment with ribs	May belong to its own genus	
Huangshanlong anhuiensis	AGB 5818	Anhui Paleontological Museum	Uncertain, Middle Jurassic	Hongqin Formation, Anhui	Mostly complete fore limb		Diagram of the holotype material
Hudiesaurus sinojapanorum	IVPP V 11120	Institute of Vertebrate Paleontology and Paleoanthropology	Kimmeridgian or Tithonian	Hongshan Formation, Xinjiang	A cervical vertebra		Diagram of the holotype material
Hypselosaurus priscus	Not catalogued	National Museum of Natural History, France	Maastrichtian	Argiles et Grès à Reptiles Formation, France	Vertebrae and limb elements		Illustration of the holotype material
Ibirania parva	LPP-PV-0200– 0207	Federal University of São Carlos	Santonian	São José do Rio Preto Formation, São Paulo	Partial vertebrae, a radius, ulna, and elements of the feet		
Igai semkhu	VB 621–640	Technische Universität Berlin	Campanian	Quseir Formation, Egypt	Five fragmentary vertebrae, shoulder and fore limb elements, hip fragments, both tibiae, a fibula, and three metatarsals	Specimen was heavily damaged by weathering due to improper storage conditions between its discovery in 1977 and its description in 2023	
Ignavusaurus rachelis	BM HR 20	National Museum of Natural History, France	Hettangian	Upper Elliot Formation, Lesotho	Extremely fragmentary skull with numerous teeth, most of the dorsal vertebrae, most of the left arm and shoulder, complete hips, both femora, and the lower right leg	Holotype is known to be a juvenile and has been suggested to be a junior synonym of Massospondylus	
Inawentu oslatus	MAU-Pv-LI-595	Urquiza Argentine Museum	Santonian	Bajo de la Carpa Formation, Patagonia	Mostly complete skull, nearly complete vertebral series, and hip bones		
Ingentia prima	PVSJ 1086	National University of San Juan	Rhaetian	Quebrada del Barro Formation, Argentine Northwest	Most of the cervical vertebrae, a nearly complete fore limb, and a shoulder fragment		Some of the holotype vertebrae which were found articulated
Irisosaurus yimenensis	CVEB 21901	Yunnan University	Hettangian	Fengjiahe Formation, Yunnan	Several scattered vertebrae, a partial rostrum, both fore limbs and shoulders, and fragments from the hip, foot, and dentary		Diagram of all the material of the holotype
Isanosaurus attavipachi	CH4	Fossil collection of the Department of Mineral Resources of Thailand	Pliensbachian	Nam Phong Formation, Thailand	A femur, partial shoulder, and several disarticulated vertebrae and ribs		The femur of the holotype on display
Isisaurus colberti	ISI R 335/1-65	Indian Statistical Institute	Maastrichtian	Lameta Formation, India	Most of the vertebrae with a mostly complete fore limb, shoulder, and a partial pelvis	Originally named Titanosaurus colberti before being given its own genus	
Issi saaneq	Holotype: NHMD 164741 Paratype: NHMD 164758	Natural History Museum of Denmark	Middle Norian	Fleming Fjord Formation, Greenland	Holotype: a mostly complete skull Paratype: a second skull		Digital model of the skull from multiple views
Itapeuasaurus cajapioensis	Holotype: UFMA. 1.10.1960-1, 3–5, 8 Paratype: UFMA. 1.10.1960-2, 6, and 9-11	Federal University of Maranhão	Cenomanian	Alcântara Formation, Maranhão	Holotype: six partial vertebrae Paratype: chevrons with a partial hip		Diagram of the holotype material
Iuticosaurus lydekkeri	Lectotype: BMNH R146a	Natural History Museum, London	Uncertain (Albian to Cenomanian?)	Upper Greensand Formation, England	A caudal vertebra	Originally referred to Ornithopsis and then to Titanosaurus before being referred to the genus Iuticosaurus as a new species	
Iuticosaurus valdensis	Lectotype: BMNH 151	Natural History Museum, London	Barremian	Wessex Formation, England	A caudal vertebra	Type species of Iuticosaurus, originally referred to Ornithopsis and then to Titanosaurus before being given its own genus, the presumed paralectotype was given its own species, I. lydekkeri	Illustration of the holotype vertebra
Jainosaurus septentionalis	Lectotype: GSI IM K27/497 Paralectotypes: GSI K20/317, 326, 647, and K27/425, 490–492, 496	Geological Survey of India	Maastrichtian	Lameta Formation, India	Lectotype: a braincase Paralectotypes: several vertebrae, ribs fragments, and two arm bones	Originally named as a species of Antarctosaurus before being given its own genus	
Jaklapallisaurus asymmetrica	Holotype: ISI R273/1-3 Paratype: ISI R273/4-15	Indian Statistical Institute	Late Norian to Early Rhaetian	Upper Maleri Formation, India	Holotype: an ilium, femur, and other partial leg elements Paratype: several vertebrae, hip elements, and bones from the lower fore limbs and hind limbs	The holotype and paratype were both found in association, but only the articulated elements were designated as the holotype because the paratypes are from multiple individuals	
Janenschia robusta	SMNS 12144	State Museum of Natural History Stuttgart	Tithonian	Tendaguru Formation, Tanzania	Mostly complete hind limb	Was originally named Gigantosaurus robustus, but the name was preoccupied so it was later referred to Tornieria and then to Barosaurus before being given its own genus	The holotype in situ on display in Germany
Jiangshanosaurus xidiensis	ZNM M1322	Zhejiang Museum of Natural History	Cenomanian	Jinhua Formation, Zhejiang	Several vertebrae, a shoulder, a partial hip, and a femur		
Jiangxititan ganzhouensis	NHMG 034062	Natural History Museum of Guangxi	Maastrichtian	Nanxiong Formation, Jiangxi	7 articulated vertebrae with 6 ribs		
Jingiella dongxingensis	DXJL2021001	Dongxing Municipal Bureau of Natural Resources	Late Jurassic (exact age uncertain)	Lower Member, Dongxing Formation, Guangxi	6 vertebrae, both ulnae, and a femur	The initially proposed genus name Jingia was preoccupied by a moth, so the dinosaur received the replacement name Jingiella	Diagram of the holotype material
Jingshanosaurus xinwaensis	LFGT-ZLJ0113	Lufeng World Dinosaur Valley	Hettangian	Shawan Member, Lufeng Formation, Yunnan	Nearly complete skeleton including the skull and mandible		
Jobaria tiguidensis	MNN TIG3	Musée National Boubou Hama	Uncertain (Callovian to Late Jurassic?)	Tiourarén Formation, Niger	Mostly complete skeleton		A cast of the head from the holotype on display
Kaatedocus siberi	SMA 0004	Aathal Dinosaur Museum	Kimmeridgian	Lower Morrison Formation, Wyoming	Skull and postcranial fragments	Most of the bones of the original specimen were destroyed in a fire at the AMNH in the 1940s	Skull of the holotype from multiple views
Kaijutitan maui	MAU-Pv-CM-522	Urquiza Argentine Municipal Museum	Coniacian	Sierra Barrosa Formation, Patagonia	Partial skull with fragmentary postcrania including ribs, vertebrae, long bones, and other unidentified fragments		
Karongasaurus gittelmani	Mal-175	Malawi Department of Antiquities	Uncertain (Barremian to Aptian?)	Dinosaur Beds, Malawi	Partial dentary with associated teeth		The jaw and teeth of the holotype shown from multiple views
Katepensaurus goicoecheai	UNPSJB-PV 1007	National University of Patagonia San Juan Bosco	Cenomanian to Turonian	Lower Bajo Barreal Formation, Patagonia	A series of disarticulated vertebrae with unidentified fragments		The holotype vertebrae laid out individually and labeled
Kholumolumo ellenbergerorum	Holotype: MNHN.F.LES381m Paratypes: MNHN.F.LES26, 29, 32, 54, 76–77, 81–82, 89, 92–93, 147, 152–153, 155, 159, 168–169, 375a, 376, 378–379, 386, 394, and 397	National Museum of Natural History, France	Rhaetian	Lower Elliot Formation, Lesotho	Holotype: complete tibia Paratypes: partial skull, numerous vertebrae, a partial shoulder, a humerus, ulna, several hand bones, a partial hip, most of the right hind limb, and the left metatarsals		
Kotasaurus yamanpalliensis	21/SR/PAL	Birla Science Museum	Sinemurian to Pliensbachian	Kota Formation, India	Most of the skeleton lacking the skull		The holotype on display and mounted with a hypothetical skull
Lamplughsaura dharmaramensis	ISI R257	Indian Statistical Institute	Sinemurian	Upper Dharmaram Formation, India	Most of the vertebrae, several ribs, shoulder and hip elements, both humeri, other hand bones, and most of the legs		
Laplatasaurus araukanicus	Lectotype: MLP 26-306	La Plata Museum	Campanian	Anacleto Formation, Patagonia	A tibia and fibula	No holotype was originally designated when it was described; has also been referred to the genus Titanosaurus, but this is not universally accepted	An illustration of the holotype in lateral view
Lapparentosaurus madagascariensis	MAA 91-92	National Museum of Natural History, Paris	Bathonian	Isalo III Formation, Madagascar	Two partial vertebrae		
Lavocatisaurus agrioensis	MOZ-Pv1232	Museum of Dr. Juan A. Olsacher	Aptian	Rayoso Formation, Patagonia	Mostly complete head and neck, a shoulder, a fore arm, ribs, leg bones, and part of the tail		
Ledumahadi mafube	BP/1/7120	Evolutionary Studies Institute	Hettangian	Elliot Formation, South Africa	Several vertebrae, a hip bone, and limb fragments		
Leinkupal laticauda	Holotype: MMCH-Pv 63–1 Paratypes: MMCH-Pv 63–2 to 63-8	Ernesto Bachmann Paleontological Museum	Valanginian	Bajada Colorada Formation, Patagonia	Holotype: a tail vertebra Paratypes: seven additional vertebrae		The holotype tail vertebra shown from multiple views
Leonerasaurus taquetrensis	MPEF-PV 1663	Museum of Paleontology Egidio Feruglio	Uncertain, probably Early Jurassic, but could be Late Triassic	Upper Member, Las Leoneras Formation, Patagonia	A lower jaw with teeth, a mostly articulated vertebral column, a shoulder, humerus, most of the hips, a partial femur, and a few foot bones		
Lessemsaurus sauropoides	PVL 4822-1/1 to 4822-1/7 and 4822-1/10	National University of Tucumán	Norian	Los Colorados Formation, Argentine Northwest	Nine dorsal vertebrae	Type species for the family "Lessemsauridae"; additional remains were discovered associated with the holotype, but these are not confidently known to be from the same individual	
Leyesaurus marayensis	PVSJ 706	National University of San Juan	Early Jurassic, exact age uncertain	Quebrada del Barro Formation, Marayes Group, Patagonia	A complete skull with neck vertebrae with fragments from the tail, foot, hips, and shoulder		A digital reconstruction of the holotype material
Liaoningotitan sinensis	PMOL-AD00112	Paleontological Museum of Liaoning	Barremian	Yixian Formation, Liaoning	A partial skull, humerus, and a hip bone		
Ligabuesaurus leanzai	MCF-PHV-233	Carmen Funes Municipal Museum	Albian	Cullín Grande Member, Lohan Cura Formation, Patagonia	A partial maxilla with teeth, six vertebrae, shoulders, both humeri, a mostly complete leg, and other fragments of ribs and the hands		
Limaysaurus tessonei	MUCPv-205	National University of Comahue	Cenomanian	Huincul Formation, Patagonia	A partial hip and several tail vertebrae	Type species of the subfamily "Limaysaurinae"; originally named as a species of Rebbachisaurus before being given its own genus	Diagrams of known material with the holotype in green (left)
Lingwulong shenqi	Holotype: LM V001a Paratypes: LGP V001b	Lingwu Museum	Toarcian or Bajocian	Yanan Formation, Ningxia	Holotype: partial brain case Paratype: several vertebrae, a partial hip, and most of a hind limb		Elements of the holotype laid out individually
Lirainosaurus astibiae	Holotype: MCNA 7458 Paratypes: MCNA 3160 and 7439-7474	Juan Cornelio Moyano Museum of Natural and Anthropological Sciences	Campanian	Vitoria Formation, Spain	Holotype: a caudal vertebra Paratypes: a partial brain case, several teeth, several vertebrae, a shoulder, several limb bones, and osteoderms	Type series belongs to at least two individuals	The brain case of the paratype shown from multiple views
Lishulong wangi	LFGT-ZLJ0011	Lufeng World Dinosaur Valley	Late Sinemurian or Toarcian	Shawan Member, Lufeng Formation, Yunnan	Mostly complete skull and nine cervical vertebrae		
Liubangosaurus hei	NHMG 8152	Natural History Museum of Guangxi	Aptian	Xinlong Formation, Guangxi	Five articulated caudal vertebrae		
Lohuecotitan pandafilandi	HUE-EC-01	Castilla-la Mancha Science Museum	Late Campanian	Villalba de la Sierra Formation, Spain	Several vertebrae, ribs, a partial hip, several leg bones, and some unidentified fragments		A photo of the holotype during excavation
Loricosaurus scutatus	MLP.Cs.1210, 1213–1215, 1218–1221, 1226, 1228–1232, 1235, 1237, 1470–1477, 2006, 2010	La Plata Museum	Maastrichtian	Allen Formation, Patagonia	Several osteoderms	Was originally believed to be an ankylosaur, but is currently believed to be a sauropod; subjective junior synonym of Neuquensaurus	
Losillasaurus giganteus	SNH 180	Museum of Natural Sciences of Valencia	Kimmeridgian	Villar del Arzobispo Formation, Spain	A partial skull with a few vertebrae, most of an arm, shoulder bones, and hips		One of the vertebrae from the holotype
Lourinhasaurus alenquerensis	Lectotype: MIGM 4956–7, 4970, 4975, 4979–80, 4983-4 and 5780-1	Geological Museum of the Geological and Mining Institute, Lisbon	Kimmeridgian	Praia da Amoreira-Porto Novo Member, Lourinhã Formation, Portugal	Several vertebrae with associated ribs, both shoulders, part of the hips, and several bones of the arm and leg	Has been variously referred to the genera Atlantosaurus, Apatosaurus, Camarasaurus, and Brontosaurus in the past; no holotype was originally assigned, but all the lectotype elements are believed to be from a single individual	
Lufengosaurus huenei	IVPP V15	Paleozoological Museum of China	Hettangian	Shawan Member, Lower Lufeng Formation, Yunnan	Mostly complete skeleton with a skull	Type species of Lufengosaurus	The holotype on display in Beijing
Lufengosaurus magnus	IVPP V.82	Paleozoological Museum of China	Hettangian	Shawan Member, Lower Lufeng Formation, Yunnan	TBD	Subjective junior synonym of L. huenei	
Lusotitan atalaiensis	Lectotypes: MIGM 4798, 4801–10, 4938, 4944, 4950, 4952, 4958, 4964–6, 4981–2, 4985, 8807, and 8793-5	Geological Museum of the Geological and Mining Institute, Lisbon	Late Kimmeridgian	Praia da Amoreira-Porto Novo Member, Lourinhã Formation, Portugal	Several caudal vertebrae, ribs fragments, parts of the shoulders, partial arm bones, most of the hips, and parts of the left foot	Originally described as a species of Brachiosaurus; no holotype was originally designated	The humerus from the holotype shown from multiple views
Macrocollum itaquii	Holotype: CAPPA/UFSM 0001a Paratypes: CAPPA/UFSM 0001b and 0001c	Paleontological Research Support Center of Quarta Colônia	Early Norian	Caturrita Formation, Rio Grande do Sul	Holotypes: mostly complete skeleton Paratypes: two other skeletons lacking the skull and neck		A composite diagram of the type series
Macrurosaurus platypus	CAMSM B55449-55453	Sedgwick Museum of Earth Sciences	Albian	Chalk Group, England	Four metatarsals	Originally named as a species of Acanthopholis before the metatarsals of the type series were referred to the genus Macrurosaurus; may be a nomen dubium	Metatarsals of the holotype shown from multiple views
Macrurosaurus semnus	Syntypes: SM B55630-55652	Sedgwick Museum of Earth Sciences	Albian	Cambridge Greensand, England	23 caudal vertebrae from at least two animals	Type species of Macrurosaurus	An illustration of one of the vertebrae from the type series
Magyarosaurus dacus	MBFSZ Ob.3091	Hungarian Geological Survey	Early Maastrichtian	Sânpetru Formation, Romania	Two caudal vertebrae and a toe claw	Originally Titanosaurus dacus before being given its own genus; type species of Magyarosaurus	
Magyarosaurus hungaricus	MAFI Ob.3104	Hungarian Geological Survey	Maastrichtian	Lower Sânpetru Formation, Romania	A humerus	The holotype is significantly larger than any other known fossils of Magyarosaurus, and some have suggested it belongs to its own genus, others believe it may be a junior synonym of M. dacus	
Malarguesaurus florenciae	IANIGLA-PV 110	Argentine Institute of Nivology, Glaciology and Environmental Sciences	Turonian	Portezuelo Formation, Patagonia	Several caudal vertebrae, ribs, a partial humerus, femur, and several indeterminate fragments		
Malawisaurus dixeyi	SAM 7405	Iziko South African Museum	Barremian or Aptian	Dinosaur Beds, Malawi	Holotype: a caudal vertebra Topotype: skull fragments, teeth, several more vertebrae, two sternal bones, and a partial hip	Originally named as a species of Gigantosaurus, and later Tornieria, before being moved to its own genus	A mount in Toronto based on the holotype
Mamenchisaurus anyuensis	AL 001	Uncertain	Possibly Late Jurassic or Early Cretaceous	Penglaizhen Formation, Sichuan	Mostly complete skull and skeleton only lacking a few foot bones; has been alternatively spelled M. anyueensis	May represent a distinct genus	
Mamenchisaurus constructus	IVPP AS V.790	Institute of Vertebrate Paleontology and Paleoanthropology	Kimmeridgian	Upper Member, Shaximiao Formation, Sichuan	Partial skeleton lacking the skull, hips, and arms	Type species of Mamenchisaurus and of the family "Mamenchisauridae"	
Mamenchisaurus hochuanensis	CCG V 20401	Chengdu College of Geology	Bathonian	Upper Member, Shaximiao Formation, Sichuan	Almost complete vertebral series lacking the skull		
Mamenchisaurus jingyanensis	Holotype: CV 00734 Paratype: JV 002	Chongqing Museum of Natural History	Bathonian	Upper Shaximiao Formation, Sichuan	Holotype: shoulder and forelimb bones, a partial hip, and a complete skull Paratype: several scattered vertebrae, most of the limbs, and several teeth	Bones from three individuals were found at the type locality, but only two of them were named as the type series	
Mamenchisaurus sinocanadorum	IVPP V10603	Institute of Vertebrate Paleontology and Paleoanthropology	Oxfordian	Upper Shishugou Formation, Xinjiang	Mostly complete skull with three neck vertebrae	May represent a distinct genus	
Mamenchisaurus youngi	ZDM 0083	Zigong Dinosaur Museum	Bathonian	Upper Member, Shaximiao Formation, Sichuan	Mostly complete skeleton with a skull		
Mamenchisaurus yunnanensis	V1481	Geological Museum of China	Late Jurassic, exact age uncertain	Anning Formation, Yunnan	A few fragmentary limb bones and some of the hips	May represent a distinct genus	
Mansourasaurus shahinae	MUVP 200	Mansoura University	Late Campanian	Quseir Formation, Egypt	Skull and jaw fragments, five vertebrae, shoulder bones, eight ribs, both humeri, a radius, several foot bones, and some osteoderms	Holotype is believed to be a juvenile individual	
Maraapunisaurus fragillimus	AMNH 5777	Now lost, was last known to be at the American Museum of Natural History	Tithonian	Brushy Basin Member, Morrison Formation, Colorado	One partial dorsal vertebra (now lost)	Originally named as a species of Amphicoelias before being given its own genus	Cope's illustration of the holotype vertebra
Marmarospondylus robustus	NHMUK R.22428	Natural History Museum, London	Bathonian	Forest Marble Formation, England	A dorsal vertebra	May be a nomen dubium	
Massospondylus browni	NHMUK PV R3302	Natural History Museum, London	Uncertain, exact locality unknown, sometime in the Early Jurassic	Upper Elliot Formation, South Africa	Seven vertebrae and fragments of the limb bones	Generally considered a nomen dubium	
Massospondylus carinatus	Syntypes: never catalogued Neotype: BP/1/4934	Evolutionary Studies Institute	Hettangian	Upper Elliot Formation, South Africa	Syntypes: Five damaged vertebrae Neotype: a nearly complete skeleton with a skull	Syntypes were destroyed in WWII, type species of Massospondylus and of the family "Massospondylidae"	Neotype skeleton shown from left and right views
Massospondylus harriesi	SAM 3394	Iziko South African Museum	Pliensbachian	Upper Elliot Formation, South Africa	Most of a forelimb and a few leg bones	Subjective junior synonym of M. carinatus	
Massospondylus hislopi	M G.281/1-u	Geological Survey of India	Carnian	Lower Maleri Formation, India	A single vertebra	Generally considered a nomen dubium	
Massospondylus kaalae	SAM-PK-K1325	Iziko South African Museum	Hettangian	Upper Elliot Formation, South Africa	A disarticulated skull		
Massospondylus rawesi	NHMUK PV R4190	Natural History Museum, London	Maastrichtian	Takli Formation, India	A tooth	May be a nomen dubium, possibly a theropod; almost certainly not a species of Massospondylus due to its age	
Massospondylus schwartzi	SAM 5134	Iziko South African Museum	Pliensbachian	Upper Elliot Formation, South Africa	Partial hind limb and hip bone	Subjective junior synonym of M. carinatus	
Maxakalisaurus topai	MN 5013-V	National Museum of Brazil	Late Campanian	Adamantina Formation, Bauru Group, Minas Gerais	Most of the cervical vertebrae, vertebral fragments from the back and tail, several ribs, a shoulder bone, and several fragments of the forelimbs		A mount based on the holotype on display in Rio de Janeiro
Mbiresaurus raathi	NHMZ 2222	Natural History Museum of Zimbabwe	Carnian	Pebbly Arkose Formation, Zimbabwe	Partially complete skeleton including a skull and bones from almost every part of the animal		
Melanorosaurus readi	Syntypes: SAM 3449 and SAM 3450	Iziko South African Museum	Norian	Lower Elliot Formation, South Africa	Partial skeleton with bones from every area of the body, but lacking the skull	Type species of the family "Melanorosauridae"	
Mendozasaurus neguyelap	IANIGLA-PV 065	Argentine Institute of Nivology, Glaciology and Environmental Sciences	Coniacian	Sierra Barrosa Formation, Patagonia	Several tail vertebrae		
Menucocelsior arriagadai	MPCN-PV-798	Patagonian Museum of Natural Sciences	Maastrichtian	Allen Formation, Argentina	17 tail vertebrae, a humerus, a fibula, and several boot bones		
Meroktenos thabanensis	MNHN.F.LES 16	National Museum of Natural History, Paris	Norian	Lower Elliot Formation, Lesotho	A femur, parts of a hip, and several foot bones	Originally named as a species of Melanorosaurus before being given its own genus	Femur from the holotype
Microcoelus patagonicus	MLP-Ly 23	La Plata Museum	Santonian	Bajo de la Carpa Formation, Patagonia	A single vertebra	Considered a nomen dubium	An illustration of the holotype vertebra
Mierasaurus bobyoungi	UMNH.VP.26004	Natural History Museum of Utah	Late Berriasian or Early Aptian	Lower Yellow Cat Member, Cedar Mountain Formation, Utah	A mostly complete disarticulated skeleton including a partial skull and jaw		Cranial bones of the holotype laid out individually and labeled
Mnyamawamtuka moyowamkia	RRBP 05834	Rukwa Rift Basin Project	Uncertain, Middle to Late Cretaceous (Aptian to Campanian?)	Mtuka Member, Galula Formation, Tanzania	Partially complete skeleton lacking the skull		
Moabosaurus utahensis	BYU 14387	BYU Museum of Paleontology	Aptian	Yellow Cat Member, Cedar Mountain Formation, Utah	Three dorsal vertebrae	Thousands of bones from at least 18 individuals were found, but only three vertebrae were selected as the type specimen	A composite skeletal mount made from the specimens recovered from the type locality
Mongolosaurus haplodon	AMNH 6710	American Museum of Natural History	Aptian or Albian	On Gong Formation, Inner Mongolia	A tooth		An illustration of the type specimen
Morinosaurus typus	Unknown, now lost	Lost, original location not known	Kimmeridgian	Unnamed formation near Boulogne-sur-Mer, France	A tooth	Sometimes considered a junior synonym of Pelorosaurus	Illustration of the type specimen
Morosaurus impar	YPM 1905	Peabody Museum of Natural History	Kimmeridgian	Morrison Formation, Wyoming	A partial sacrum	Probable junior synonym of Camarasaurus grandis	
Musankwa sanyatiensis	NHMZ 2521	Natural History Museum of Zimbabwe	Norian	Pebbly Arkose Formation, Upper Karoo Group, Zimbabwe	Most of a right leg with several other indeterminate fragments		A diagram of the holotype material
Mussaurus patagonicus	PVL 4068	National University of Tucumán	Sinemurian	Laguna Colorada Formation, Patagonia	A fully articulated skeleton	Holotype is known to be a very young juvenile	The holotype in its matrix
Muyelensaurus pecheni	Holotype: MRS-PV 207 Paratypes: MRS-Pv 50–60, 65–68, 70, 72, 87–91, 121–122, 125, 127–128, 131–132, 134, 137, 139, 141–147, 152, 154, 157, 161–162, 164–168, 170–174, 181–182, 187, 189–193, 198–200, 202, 204, 209, 212, 214, 224, 229–232, 235–237, 242–243, 245–247, 251–252, 257–259, 266, 273–274, 279, 337, 352–353, 355–358, 369, 371, 375, 377–379, 387, 389, 391–392, 396–397, 399, 404, 408, 412, 420–422, 428-429	Rincón de los Sauces Museum	Coniacian	Plottier Formation, Patagonia	Holotype: a braincase Paratypes: mostly complete skeletons from four adults and one juvenile		
Nambalia roychowdhurii	Holotype: ISI R273/1-3 Paratypes: ISI R273/4-29	Indian Statistical Institute	Late Norian to Early Rhaetian	Upper Maleri Formation, India	Holotype: a few leg bones and part of a hip Paratypes: several vertebrae, a partial hip, and several hand and hip bones	Holotype elements were found articulated, the paratypes were found in association and belong to at least two individuals	
Narambuenatitan palomoi	MAU-Pv-N-425	Urquiza Argentine Municipal Museum	Early Campanian	Anacleto Formation, Neuquén Group, Patagonia	Partial skulls with numerous vertebrae and associated ribs, a partial shoulder, several long bones of the limbs, hip, and foot bones		
Narindasaurus thevenini	MNHN MAJ 423-430	National Museum of Natural History, France	Bathonian	Isalo III Formation, Madagascar	Three partial vertebrae, several limb bones, a partial hip, and a tooth		The pubis of the holotype on display in Madagascar
Nebulasaurus taito	LDRC-v.d.1	Lufeng Dinosaur Research Center	Aalenian or Bajocian	Zhanghe Formation, Yunnan	A braincase		The holotype shown from multiple views
Nemegtosaurus mongoliensis	ZPAL MgD-I/9	Polish Academy of Sciences	Maastrichtian	Nemegt Formation, Mongolia	Mostly complete skull	Type species of Nemegtosaurus and of the family "Nemegtosauridae"	A cast of the holotype skull on display in Warsaw
Nemegtosaurus pachi	IVPP V.4879	Institute of Vertebrate Paleontology and Paleoanthropology	Campanian or Maastrichtian	Subashi Formation, Xinjiang	A tooth	Some authors consider it a nomen dubium	
Neosodon sp.	BHN2R 112	Museum of Natural History of Boulogne-sur-Mer	Tithonian	Sables et Grès à Trigonia gibbosa, France	A tooth	Was variously assigned to the genera Caulodon, Cardiodon, and Pelorosaurus before being reassigned to its own genus; holotype was never formally given a species epithet, some sources list it as N. praecursor because the tooth was previously assigned the name Iguanodon praecursor; now considered a nomen dubium	Illustration of the type specimen
Neuquensaurus australis	MLP Ly 1-6-V-28-1	La Plata Museum	Campanian	Anacleto Formation	Six caudal vertebrae	Type species of Neuquensaurus, originally named as a species of Titanosaurus before being referred to Saltasaurus and later being given its own genus	A photo of all six caudals of the holotype
Neuquensaurus robustus	Lectotypes: MLP 26-250, 252, 254, and 259	La Plata Museum	Campanian	Anacleto Formation	Three metacarpals	Originally assigned as a species of Titanosaurus before being referred to Saltasaurus and then Neuquensaurus, may be a nomen dubium	
Ngwevu intloko	BP/1/4779	Environmental Studies Institute, University of the Witwatersrand	Pliensbachian	Clarens Formation, South Africa	Partial skull		The holotype shown from multiple views
Nhandumirim waldsangae	LPRP/USP 0651	University of São Paulo	Carnian	Santa Maria Formation, Rio Grande do Sul	2 partial vertebrae, hip fragments, and a nearly complete hindlimb	Has previously been considered a theropod, or a basal saurischian, but is now widely considered a sauropodomorph	Diagram of the holotype material
Nigersaurus taqueti	MNN GAD512	Musée National Boubou Hama	Aptian	Elrhaz Formation, Niger	Partial skull, neck vertebrae, a shoulder bone, and limb elements		A cast of the holotype skull in Ontario
Ninjatitan zapatai	MMCh-Pv228	Ernesto Bachmann Paleontological Museum	Late Berriasian	Bajada Colorada Formation, Patagonia	Several scattered vertebrae, a scapula, and a partial femur and tibia		
Nopcsaspondylus alarconensis	Not catalogued	Lost, was last known to be at the University of Vienna	Cenomanian	Candeleros Formation, Patagonia	A single vertebra	Known as "the Nopsca vertebra" before it was named, specimen is now lost	
Normanniasaurus genceyi	MHNH-2013.2.1.1 through MHNH-2013.2.1.12	National Museum of Natural History, France	Albian	Poudingue Ferrugineux, France	Vertebral fragments, parts of the hips, a shoulder bone, and a partial femur and fibula		
Notocolossus gonzalezparejasi	UNCUYO-LD 301	National University of Cuyo	Late Coniacian or Early Santonian	Plottier Formation, Patagonia	A humerus, two vertebrae, and a partial hip bone		Digital reconstruction of the holotype
Nullotitan glaciaris	MACN-PV 18644 and MPM 21542	Padre Molina Provincial Regional Museum and Bernardino Rivadavia Natural Sciences Argentine Museum	Maastrichtian	Chorrillo Formation, Patagonia	Numerous vertebrae and several disarticulated limb bones	Only one vertebra is stored at the Bernardino Rivadavia Museum, but both specimens are from the same individual	Digital reconstruction of the holotype material
Nyasasaurus parringtoni	NHMUK R6856	Natural History Museum, London	Anisian, but this has been disputed	Manda Formation, Tanzania	Several vertebrae, a partial shoulder, and a humerus	Oldest known dinosaur, has been variously classified as a theropod, a sauropodomorph, an ornithischian, or even a stem-dinosaur	Digital reconstruction of the holotype with a hypothetical bauplan
Oceanotitan dantasi	SHN 181	Society of Natural History of Torres Vedras	Kimmeridgian	Lourinhã Formation, Portugal	A partial shoulder, most of the hips, a complete hind limb, and nine caudal vertebrae		Diagram of the holotype material with known elements in white
Ohmdenosaurus liasicus	No catalogue number given	Hauff Museum	Toarcian	Posidonia Shale, Germany	Elements of the lower hind limb	Was originally misidentified as a plesiosaur before being re-examined	The holotype with each bone labeled
Omeisaurus changshouensis	IVPP V930	Institute of Vertebrate Paleontology and Paleoanthropology	Bathonian	Daanzhai Member, Shaximiao Formation, Sichuan	Eleven vertebrae and other postcranial fragments	Some authors have referred this species to the genus Mamenchisaurus	
Omeisaurus fuxiensis	CV 00267	Chongqing Natural History Museum	Bathonian	Upper Member, Shaximiao Formation, Sichuan	Partial skull	Considered by some to belong to the genus Mamenchisaurus	
Omeisaurus jiaoi	ZDM 5050	Zigong Dinosaur Museum	Bajocian	Lower Member, Shaximiao Formation, Sichuan	Almost complete disarticulated skeleton lacking the head and neck		
Omeisaurus junghsiensis	Never catalogued, now lost	Lost, was last reposited at the Institute of Vertebrate Paleontology and Paleoanthropology	Bathonian	Daanzhai Member, Shaximiao Formation, Sichuan	Four cervical vertebrae (lost)	Type species of Omeisaurus, the holotype was destroyed in WWII	
Omeisaurus luoquanensis	IVPP V.21501	Institute of Vertebrate Paleontology and Paleoanthropology	Oxfordian	Lower Member, Shaximiao Formation, Sichuan	3 cervical, 11 dorsal, and most of the caudal vertebrae, several ribs, a partial shoulder, a humerus, a femur, and a partial hip		
Omeisaurus maoianus	ZNM N8510	Zhejiang Museum of Natural History	Kimmeridgian	Upper Member, Shaximiao Formation, Sichuan	Mostly complete skull, numerous vertebrae, most of the hips, and several long bones of the limbs		
Omeisaurus puxiani	CLGRP V00005	Chongqing Laboratory of Geoheritage Protection and Research	Bathonian	Lower Member, Shiaximiao Formation, Sichuan	Most of the vertebrae, a few ribs, a complete fore limb, parts of both femora, a tibia, and hip elements		
Omeisaurus tianfuensis	Holotype: ZDM T7501 Paratypes: ZDM T7502	Zigong Dinosaur Museum	Bajocian	Lower Member, Shaximiao Formation, Sichuan	Holotype: almost complete skeleton lacking the skull, the end of the tail, and the hind feet Paratype: mostly complete skull with associated cervical vertebrae		
Opisthocoelicaudia skarzynskii	MPC-D100/404	Mongolian Academy of Sciences	Maastrichtian	Nemegt Formation, Mongolia	Most of the postcranial skeleton except for the neck		The holotype mounted at an exhibition in Japan
Oplosaurus armatus	BMNH R964	Natural History Museum, London	Barremian	Wessex Formation, England	One tooth	Was originally described as a carnivorous dinosaur or possibly as Hylaeosaurus, but it is now understood to be a sauropod	An illustration of the holotype tooth shown from multiple views
Ornithopsis hulkei	Lectotype: BMNH R28632	Natural History Museum, London	Barremian	Wealden Group, England	One vertebra, other elements have since been referred to other species	Generally considered a nomen dubium; the same material was used to describe the species Bothriospondylus magnus and Chondrosteosaurus magnus making them objective junior synonyms;	The lectotype vertebra
Overosaurus paradasorum	MAU-Pv-CO-439	Urquiza Argentine Municipal Museum	Santonian	Bajo de la Carpa Formation, Patagonia	Numerous vertebrae, ribs, and a partial hip		
Pachysaurus ajax	GPIT-PV-30790, -60185, -60196, -60198 to -60201, -60203, -111862	Institute of Geosciences, University of Tübingen	Uncertain, possibly Rhaetian	Uncertain, possibly the Trossingen Formation, Germany	Both forelimbs, both shoulders, and several neck and back vertebrae	Type species of Pachysaurus, the genera "Pachysauriscus" and "Pachysaurops" are objective junior synonyms, has been considered invalid in the past	
Pachysaurus giganteus	GPIT-PV-60234 to GPIT- PV-60236	Institute of Geosciences, University of Tübingen	Rhaetian	Trossingen Formation, Germany	Three metatarsals	May be a nomen dubium	
Pachysaurus magnus	GPIT-PV-60298, -60166, -60167, -60169, -60173, -60174, -60176, -60182, -60294, -60295, -60310, -111909	Institute of Geosciences, University of Tübingen	Rhaetian	Trossingen Formation, Germany	Fragments of vertebrae, ribs, and shoulder bones with partial arm bones and a fibula		
Pachysaurus wetzeli	GPIT-PV-30788	Institute of Geosciences, University of Tübingen	Rhaetian	Trossingen Formation, Germany	Several vertebrae, most of the hips, and most of the left leg		
Pachysuchus imperfectus	IVPP V 40	Institute of Vertebrate Paleontology and Paleoanthropology	Hettangian or Sinemurian	Lower Lufeng Formation, Yunnan	Partial skull	Originally misidentified as a genus of phytosaur, but was later re-identified as a sauropodomorph, generally considered a nomen dubium	
Padillasaurus leivaensis	JACVM 0001	National University of Colombia	Barremian	Paja Formation, Colombia	Ten articulated vertebrae		The holotype specimen in a display case
Paludititan nalatzensis	UBB NVM1	Babeș-Bolyai University	Early Maastrichtian	Sânpetru Formation	Over 20 vertebrae, a mostly complete pelvis, a partial femur, and two claws		One of the vertebra from the holotype
Paluxysaurus jonesi	FWMSH 93B-10-18	Fort Worth Museum of Science and History	Late Aptian	Twin Mountains Formation, Trinity Group, Texas	Partial skull with associated teeth	Generally considered a junior synonym of Sauroposeidon proteles; was the original state dinosaur for the US state of Texas before being synonymized with Sauroposeidon	Diagram of all known skeletal material of Paluxysaurus, including the holotype
Pampadromaeus barberenai	ULBRA-PVT016	Lutheran University of Brazil	Norian	Alemoa Member, Santa Maria Formation, Rio Grande do Sul	A mostly complete skeleton lacking one of the arms and a few vertebrae	Classification as a sauropodomorph is weakly supported	
Panamericansaurus schroederi	MUCPv-417	National University of Comahue	Late Campanian	Allen Formation, Patagonia	Six vertebrae with associated chevrons, a humerus, and rib fragments		
Panphagia protos	PVSJ 874	Institute and Museum of Natural Sciences, San Juan	Norian	Ischigualasto Formation, Argentine Northwest	Partial skull with numerous vertebrae, hip and shoulder elements, and most of the hind limbs		A replica of the holotype as it was seen in situ
Pantydraco caducus	BMNH P 24	Natural History Museum, London	Rhaetian	Pant-y-Ffynnon Quarry, Wales	A skull with a partial jawbone, neck vertebrae, hip bones, and partial fore limbs	Originally named as a new species of Thecodontosaurus before being given its own genus	
Paralititan stromeri	CGM 81119	Egyptian Geological Museum	Cenomanian	Bahariya Formation, Egypt	Several vertebrae, parts of both shoulders, both humeri, and a foot bone		Both humeri of the holotype on display in Egypt
Patagosaurus fariasi	PVL 4170	National University of Tucumán	Toarcian	Cañadón Asfalto Formation, Patagonia	An almost complete skeleton lacking the skull		A museum mount based on the holotype with a hypothetical skull
Patagotitan mayorum	MPEF-PV 3400	Museum of Paleontology Egidio Feruglio	Albian	Cerro Castaño Member, Cerro Barcino Formation, Patagonia	15 vertebrae from various areas, several ribs, parts of the shoulders, both pubic bones, and both femora		Part of the holotype mid-preparation
Pellegrinisaurus powelli	MPCA 1500	Carlos Ameghino Provincial Museum	Campanian	Lower Member, Allen Formation, Patagonia	Four dorsal and most of the caudal vertebrae with most of a femur		Diagram of the holotype material
Pelorosaurus conybeari	BMNH 28626	Natural History Museum, London	Valanginian	Tunbridge Wells Sand Formation, Wealden Group, England	A humerus; other material was referred to this specimen, but this was probably from another individual	Originally referred to Cetiosaurus before being given its own genus, part of the original type material is an objective junior synonym of Cetiosaurus brevis	The holotype humerus shown from multiple views
Perijasaurus lapaz	UCMP 37689	University of California Museum of Paleontology	Toarcian	La Quinta Formation, Colombia	A partial vertebra		
Petrobrasaurus puestohernandezi	MAU-Pv-PH-449	Urquiza Argentine Municipal Museum	Coniacian	Plottier Formation, Patagonia	Several vertebrae, two teeth, most of the hind limbs, partial ribs, a humerus, carpals, and a partial shoulder		
Phuwiangosaurus sirindhornae	SM PW 1	Phu Wiang Dinosaur Museum	Barremian	Sao Khua Formation, Khorat Group, Thailand	6 vertebrae, ribs, most of the shoulders, one fore limb, a complete hip, both femora, and a fibula		One of the femora from the holotype
Pilmatueia faundezi	Holotype: MLL Pv-005 Paratype: MLL-Pv-002	Las Lajas Municipal Museum	Valanginian	Mulichinco Formation, Patagonia	Holotype: a dorsal vertebra Paratype: a cervical vertebra		Diagram of the type material and other referred specimens with a silhouette based on the related taxon Amargasaurus
Pitekunsaurus macayai	MAU-Pv-AG-446	Urquiza Argentine Municipal Museum	Early Campanian	Anacleto Formation, Patagonia	A braincase, a tooth, a frontal bone, 11 vertebrae, fore limb elements, a partial femur, rib fragments, and some uncertain fragments		
Plateosauravus cullingworthi	SAM 3341, 3345, 3347, 3350–51, 3603, 3607	South African Museum	Norian	Lower Member, Elliot Formation, South Africa	Fragmentary vertebrae, limb bones, and hip elements	Originally assigned to Plateosaurus before being given its own genus, but has since been argued to be a junior synonym of Euskelosaurus	An illustration of the humerus associated with the holotype
Plateosaurus engelhardti	Lectotype: UEN 552 Paralectotypes: 550, 554, 556, 558–559, 561–562; Unofficial holotype: SMNS 13200	State Museum of Natural History Stuttgart	Late Norian	Trossingen Formation, Germany (unofficial holotype is from the Löwenstein Formation)	Lectotype: a sacrum Paralectotypes: fragments of the vertebrae, ribs, hips, and leg bones Unofficial holotype: a nearly complete skeleton	Original type species of Plateosaurus; generally considered undiagnostic, but this is not universally accepted	
Plateosaurus erlenbergiensis	SMNS 6014	State Museum of Natural History Stuttgart	Rhaetian	Trossingen Formation, Germany	A partial skull with several vertebrae, most of the shoulders, one forelimb, hip elements, and most of the hind limbs	Subjective junior synonym of P. trossingensis	
Plateosaurus gracilis	SMNS 5715	State Museum of Natural History Stuttgart	Norian	Lower Löwenstein Formation, Germany	Five vertebrae, most of the hips, and a fibula	Originally named Sellosaurus gracilis before being referred to Plateosaurus	
Plateosaurus longiceps	MB.R.1937 (or HMN XXIV)	Natural History Museum, Berlin	Norian	Trossingen Formation, Germany	A complete skull, 18 vertebrae, most of the hip bones, several leg bones, and a scapula	Subjective junior synonym of P. erlenbergensis	
Plateosaurus quenstedti	AMNH 6810	American Museum of Natural History	Norian	Trossingen Formation, Germany	A skull with an almost complete skeleton only lacking a few foot bones	Type specimen is undiagnostic, subjective junior synonym of P. trossingensis or P. longiceps	
Plateosaurus trossingensis	SMNS 13200	State Museum of Natural History Stuttgart	Norian	Trossingen Formation, Germany	Almost complete skeleton with a skull	Newly designated type species of Plateosaurus as well as of the family "Plateosauridae" and the clade "Plateosauria"; P. integer and P. fraasianus are objective junior synonyms	
Pleurocoelus altus	USNM 4971	Smithsonian Institution	Albian	Arundel Formation, Maryland	A tibia and fibula	Generally considered a nomen dubium due to the type material being undiagnostic; may be a junior synonym of Astrodon and is sometimes referred to as a species of that genus	
Pleurocoelus nanus	Syntypes: USNM 4968, 4969, 4970, 5678	Smithsonian Institution	Albian	Arundel Formation, Maryland	Four disarticulated vertebrae	Generally considered a nomen dubium due to the type material being undiagnostic; the specimen may also be a chimera	An illustration of the type series by O.C. Marsh
Pradhania gracilis	ISI R265	Indian Statistical Institute	Sinemurian	Upper Dharmaram Formation, India	A partial maxilla and other bone fragments		
Protognathosaurus oxyodon	CV 00732 (a.k.a. ChM V732)	Chongqing Museum of Natural History	Bajocian	Shunosaurus-Omeisaurus Assemblage, Lower Shaximiao Formation, Sichuan	Partial dentary with associated teeth	Originally named Protognathus, but that genus was preoccupied	
Puertasaurus reuili	MPM 10002	Regional Provincial Museum of Father Jesus Molina	Campanian	Cerro Fortaleza Formation, Patagonia	Four vertebrae from various parts of the spine		Diagram of the holotype elements
Pukyongosaurus milleniumi	PKNU-G.102–109	Pukyong National University	Aptian	Hasandong Formation, South Korea	Five partial vertebrae, one rib, a shoulder fragment, and two chevrons (three additional vertebrae were reported but not described)	Considered a nomen dubium by most subsequent authors, some of the type material in the original description was not able to be located when later researchers reviewed the material	
Pulanesaura eocollum	BP/1/6982	Evolutionary Studies Institute	Sinemurian	Upper Elliot Formation, South Africa	9 disarticulated vertebrae, a rib, a partial hip, a mostly complete fore limb, a tibia, a skull fragment, and a foot claw		Skeletal diagram of the holotype with a photo of each bone
Punatitan coughlini	CRILAR-Pv 614	Regional Center for Scientific Research and Technology Transfer of La Rioja	Campanian	Ciénaga del Río Huaco Formation, Argentine Northwest	Numerous vertebrae and ribs with a partial hip		A skeletal diagram of the known elements in red
Qianlong shouhu	GZPM VN001		Toarcian	Ziliujing Formation, Ziliujing Formation, Sichuan	A partial skull, an articulated series of vertebrae, a femur, a fibula, and a complete fore limb		
Qiaowanlong kangxii	FRDC GJ 07-14	Fossil Research and Development Center, Lanzhou	Aptian	Upper Member, Xiaguo Formation, Xinminpu Group, Gansu	Eight cervical vertebrae		
Qijianglong goukr	QJGPM 1001	Qijiang Petrified Wood and Dinosaur Footprint National Geological Park Museum	Uncertain, Late Jurassic or Early Cretaceous	Suining Formation, Sichuan	A partial skull and jaw, all of the cervical vertebrae with several dorsals, ribs, several tail vertebrae, a partial hip, and a few foot bones	The holotype and only specimen is likely a juvenile	
Qingxiusaurus youjiangensis	NHMG 8499	Natural History Museum of Guangxi Zhuang Autonomous Region	Uncertain, Late Cretaceous (Cenomanian to Maastrichtian?)	Unnamed formation, Guangxi	Two humeri, sternal plates, and a vertebral fragment		
Qinlingosaurus luonanensis	NWUV 1112	Northwest University	Maastrichtian	Uncertain, either from the Hongtuling Formation or the Shanyang Formation, Shaanxi	Two hip bones and three vertebrae		
Quaesitosaurus orientalis	PIN 3906/2	Russian Academy of Sciences	Campanian	Barun Goyot Formation, Mongolia	A mostly complete skull		The holotype skull with unknown elements in dark brown
Quetecsaurus rusconii	UNCUYO-LD-300	National University of Cuyo	Turonian	Lisandro Formation, Patagonia	Skull fragment, teeth, several vertebrae, ribs, and a forelimb		A diagram of the holotype material with unknown fragments in purple
Qunkasaura pintiquiniestra	HUE-EC-04	Castilla-la Mancha Science Museum	Campanian or Maastrichtian	Lo Hueca, Villalba de la Sierra Formation, Spain	Articulated vertebral series, most of the ribs, hips, a hindlimb, and other isolated bones	Each bone is given a unique specimen number, but they are all believed to belong to a single individual	
Rapetosaurus kraeusei	UA 8698	University of Antananarivo	Maastrichtian	Maevarano Formation, Madagascar	A partial skull		A cast of the holotype skull on display in Ontario
Rayososaurus agrioensis	Holotype: MACN-N 41 Paratype: UFMA 1.10.168, 1.10.188, 1.10.806, 1.10.015, 1.10.283	Bernardino Rivadavia Natural Sciences Argentine Museum	Aptian to Albian	Rayoso Formation, Patagonia	Holotype: a scapula, femur, and part of a fibula Paratype: five broken vertebrae	Authors noted that it might belong to the genus Rebbachisaurus as a new species	A diagram of the holotype (right) and paratype (left) material
Rebbachisaurus garasbae	MNHN-MRS 1476–7, 1491, 1728, 1957–8, 1979–83, 1984–5, 1987–8, 1990-2002	National Museum of Natural History, France	Cenomanian	Aoufous Formation, Kem Kem Group, Morocco	Several dorsal vertebrae, partial shoulder, hip, and humerus, with several ribs and caudal fragments	Type species of Rebbachisaurus and of the family "Rebbachisauridae" and the subfamily "Rebbachisaurinae"; holotype is represented by numerous specimens, all of which likely belonged to a single animal	A dorsal vertebrae (left) and shoulder (right) elements
Rebbachisaurus tamesnensis	Not catalogued	National Museum of Natural History, France	Late Albian	Echkar Formation, Niger	4 teeth, 100 vertebrae, 12 ribs, 5 scapulae, 1 illium, 2 ischia, and over 100 limb elements	Type specimens were never given a formal description and are known to be from numerous individuals at different localities, considered a junior synonym of R. garasbae by some	
Rhoetosaurus brownei	QM F1695	Queensland Museum	Uncertain (Oxfordian to Tithonian)	Walloon Coal Measures, Queensland	40 vertebrae, several partial ribs, most of the hips, and much of the right hind limb	More bones were found with the holotype, but these have yet to be prepared and described	
Rhomaleopakhus turpanensis	IVPP-V11121-1	Institute of Vertebrate Paleontology and Paleoanthropology	Kimmeridgian	Kalaza Formation, Xinjiang	Partial fore limb		A diagram of the holotype material
Rinconsaurus caudamirus	Holotype: MRS-Pv 26 and 13 Paratypes: MRS-Pv 2–9, 11, 16–20, 21–25, 27–31, 42–43, 46–47, 49, 92–94, 96–104, 109, 111–113, 117, 263	Rincón de los Sauces Museum	Turonian or Coniacian	Río Neuquén Formation, Patagonia	Holotype: 13 articulated vertebrae and a partial hip Paratypes: a mostly complete tail, shoulder, and hip elements, a femur, a humerus, cervical vertebrae, and skull fragments	Holotype and paratypes comprise at least three individuals	
Riojasaurus incertus	PVL 3808	National University of Tucumán	Norian	Los Colorados Formation, Argentine Northwest	Numerous sacral and caudal vertebrae, shoulder and hip bones, and some elements of the hands		
Rocasaurus muniozi	MPCA-Pv 46	Carlos Ameghino Provincial Museum	Late Campanian	Allen Formation, Patagonia	Mostly complete hip, several partial vertebrae, and a femur		The holotype material with elements labeled
Ruehleia bedheimensis	HMN MB RvL 1	Natural History Museum, Berlin	Norian	Knollenmergel Member, Trossingen Formation, Germany	Most of the vertebrae, a partial shoulder, hips, and most of the limb bones with a partial hand		Elements of the holotype on display in Germany
Rugocaudia cooneyi	MOR 334	Museum of the Rockies	Aptian or Albian	Cloverly Formation, Montana	18 caudal vertebrae, a tooth, an ankle bone, and other postcranial fragments	Considered a nomen dubium by some authors	
Ruixinia zhangi	ELDM EL-J009	Erlianhaote Dinosaur Museum	Barremian	Yixian Formation, Liaoning	Numerous vertebrae, a partial hip, a femur, a tibia, and other limb elements		
Rukwatitan bisepultus	RRBP 07409	Tanzanian Antiquities Unit	Cenomanian	Galula Formation, Tanzania	Vertebrae from all sections, several ribs, partial shoulders, a partial hip, a humerus, and a partial ulna		The humerus associated with the holotype on display
Ruyangosaurus giganteus	41HIII-0002	Henan Geological Museum	Aptian	Haoling Formation, Henan	Most of the torso lacks the shoulders, a single cervical vertebra, and most of a hind limb		A reconstruction of the animal based on the holotype
Saltasaurus loricatus	PVL 4017-92	National University of Tucumán	Early Maastrichtian	Lecho Formation, Argentine Northwest	Mostly complete hip	Multiple other specimens are categorized under PVL 4017, but these are probably not from the same individual as the holotype; type species of the superfamily "Saltasauroidea", the family "Saltasauridae", the subfamily "Saltasaurinae", and the tribe "Saltasaurini"	
Sanpasaurus yaoi	IVPP V.156	Institute of Vertebrate Paleontology and Paleoanthropology	Toarcian	Ziliujing Formation, Sichuan	20 vertebrae, scapulae, fore limbs, and some hind limb bones		A selection of vertebrae from the holotype
Sarahsaurus aurifontanalis	TxVP 43646-2	Texas Vertebrate Paleontology Collections, Jackson School Museum of Earth History, The University of Texas at Austin	Pliensbachian	Kayenta Formation, Arizona	Numerous articulated vertebrae, most of the hips, partial shoulders, both hands, and several limb bones		
Sarmientosaurus musacchoioi	MDT-PV 2	Desiderio Torres Museum of Vertebrate Paleontology	Cenomanian	Bajo Barreal Formation, Patagonia	Almost complete skull with articulated vertebrae		The holotype skull shown from multiple views
Saturnalia tupiniquim	Holotype: MCP 3844-PV Paratypes: MCP 3845-PV and MCP 3846-PV	Pontifical Catholic University of Rio Grande do Sul	Late Carnian	Alemoa Member, Santa Maria Formation, Rio Grande do Sul	Holotype: mostly complete vertebral and articulated column, most of the hips, a femur, a full hind limb, a fore limb and shoulder, and several ribs Paratypes: a jaw with associated teeth, a humerus, a partial hip and hind limb, a partial leg bone, and several scattered vertebrae	Type species for the family "Saturnaliidae"	
Sauroposeidon proteles	OMNH 53062	Sam Noble Oklahoma Museum of Natural History	Aptian	Middle Member, Antlers Formation, Oklahoma	Several contiguous cervical vertebrae	Official dinosaur of the state of Texas	Diagram of all known skeletal material with the holotype elements in white
Savannasaurus elliottorum	AODF 660	Australian Age of Dinosaurs	Cenomanian	Winton Formation, Queensland	A series of vertebrae with fore limb elements and a partial hip		Skeletal diagram of the holotype with a photo of each bone
Schleitheimia schutzi	PIMUZ A/III 550	University of Zurich	Late Norian	Grunhalde Member, Klettgau Formation, Switzerland	A partial ilium	Other bones were found in association, and may belong to the same individual, but these were not included in the holotype or named as paratypes	
Sefapanosaurus zastronensis	BP/1/386	Evolutionary Studies Institute	Hettangian	Elliot Formation, South Africa	An incomplete, but fully articulated, foot		
Seitaad ruessi	UMNH VP 18040	Natural History Museum of Utah	Pliensbachian	Navajo Sandstone, Utah	Mostly complete dorsal vertebrae, ribs, and forearms with a partial hip, a tibia, and a complete foot		Digital reconstruction of the holotype material
Sellosaurus hermannianus	SMNS 4388	State Museum of Natural History Stuttgart	Rhaetian	Löwenstein Formation, Germany	A maxilla	Originally described under the genus Belodon and then referred to Thecodontosaurus, subjective junior synonym of Plateosaurus gracilis	
Shingopana songwensis	RRBP 02100	Tanzanian Antiquities Unit	Cenomanian	Namba Member, Galula Formation, Tanzania	Partial jaw, four cervical vertebrae, and rib fragments		
Shunosaurus jianyiensis	CLGPR V00007	Chongqing Laboratory of Geoheritage Protection and Research	Bathonian to Callovian	Lower Shaximiao Formation, Sichuan	Numerous vertebrae, mostly complete shoulder girdles, the right fore limb lacking the hand, and a partial hip with the right hind limb		
Shunosaurus lii	IVPP V.9065	Institute of Vertebrate Paleontology and Paleoanthropology	Bajocian	Lower Shaximiao Formation, Sichuan	Numerous vertebrae, left radius, ulna, and a single carpal, a partially degraded hip, left femur, tibia, fibula, astragalus, and complete metatarsals	Type species of Shunosaurus	
Sibirotitan astrosacralis	PM TGU 120/10-Sh1-22	Tomsk State University	Barremian	Ilek Formation, Kemerovo	A dorsal vertebra		
Sidersaura marae	Holotype: MMCh-PV 70 Paratypes: MMCh-PV 236, 307, 309	Ernesto Bachmann Paleontological Museum	Upper Cenomanian or Lower Turonian	Huincul Formation, Patagonia	Holotype: Braincase, several vertebrae, a partial hip and shoulder, both tibiae and fibulae, and several foot bones Paratypes: Rib and vertebral fragments, pieces of hips, a tibia, and a fibula		
Silutitan sinensis	IVPP V27874	Institute of Vertebrate Paleontology and Paleoanthropology	Aptian	Shengjinkou Formation, Xinjiang	Six articulated cervical vertebrae		Diagram of the holotype material
Smitanosaurus agilis	USNM 5384	Smithsonian Institution	Kimmeridgian	Brushy Basin Member, Morrison Formation, Colorado	Partial skull and first three cervical vertebrae	Originally referred to the dubious genus Morosaurus before being given its own genus	The holotype shown fully articulated
Sonidosaurus saihangaobiensis	LH V 0010	Long Hao Institute of Geology and Paleontology	Uncertain, Late Cretaceous (Cenomanian to Maastrichtian?)	Iren Dabasu Formation, Inner Mongolia	Several vertebrae and chevrons with most of the pelvis		
Sonorasaurus thompsoni	ASDM 500	Arizona-Sonora Desert Museum	Late Albian	Turney Ranch Formation, Arizona	Fore limb elements, several ribs, vertebral fragments, a partial hip, a complete hind limb, and a fibula	Official dinosaur of the state of Arizona	
Soriatitan golmayensis	MNS 2001/122	Museo Numantino de Soria	Hauterivian	Golmayo Formation, Spain	A tooth, scattered vertebrae with associated ribs, a partial hip, a humerus, an ulna, a radius, and a partial femur		
Spinophorosaurus nigeriensis	Holotype: GCP-CV-4229 Paratype: NMB-1699-R	Holotype: Paleontological Museum of Elche Paratype: State Natural History Museum of Braunschweig	Bajocian	Irhazer II Formation, Niger	Holotype: partial skull with a mostly complete postcranial skeleton lacking a few foot bones Paratype: partial skull, most of the ribs, the humerus, and a toe		A cast of the holotype on display with missing elements filled in
Strenusaurus procerus	PVL 3663	National University of Tucumán	Norian	Los Colorados Formation, Argentine Northwest	Several vertebrae and limb bones	Subjective junior synonym of Riojasaurus	
Supersaurus vivianae	BYU 9025	Brigham Young University	Tithonian	Brushy Basin Member, Morrison Formation, Colorado	A partial shoulder		holotype shoulder on display
Suuwassea emilieae	ANS 21122	Academy of Natural Sciences of Drexel University	Tithonian(?)	Brushy Basin Member(?), Morrison Formation, Montana	A partial skull, most of the anterior of the skeleton, scattered vertebrae and ribs, and a lower hind limb	Exact type locality is unknown because the authors did not want to publish it in an effort to preserve the locality from discovery and exploitation by private fossil collectors	Diagram of the holotype material
Tambatitanis amicitae	MNHAH D-1029280	Museum of Nature and Human Activities, Hyōgo	Early Albian	Ohyamashimo Formation, Sasayama Group, Japan	Numerous vertebrae and ribs with a partial hip and a skull including the brain case and dentary		The holotype caudal vertebrae arranged in order
Tangvayosaurus hoffeti	TV4-1 to TV4-36	Dinosaur Museum, Savannakhet	Aptian	Grès supérieurs Formation, Laos	Partial hip, several vertebrae, ribs, and a humerus		The holotype on display in Laos
Tapuiasaurus macedoi	MZSP-PV 807	Museum of Zoology of the University of São Paulo	Aptian	Quiricó Formation, Minas Gerais	Mostly complete skull with dentary, several vertebrae, a partial shoulder, most of a fore limb, both femora, and other hind limb elements		The holotype skull with each element labeled
Tastavinsaurus sanzi	MPZ 99/9	Paleontological Museum of Zaragoza	Early Aptian	Xert Formation, Spain	Numerous vertebrae and chevrons with a complete pelvis, both femora, and the rest of a complete hind limb		
Tatouinea hannibalis	ONM DT 1–36	National Office of Mines	Albian	Oum ed Diab Member, Aïn el Guettar Formation, Tunisia	Articulated caudal vertebrae with a partial hip		A reconstruction of the holotype based on a close relative with known elements in pink
Tazoudasaurus naimi	To 2000–1	Tazouda Dinosaur Museum	Toarcian	Azilal Formation, Morocco	Fragmented skull, eight cervical vertebrae, and several limb bones		The holotype vertebrae labeled individually
Tehuelchesaurus benitezii	MPEF-PV 1125	Museum of Paleontology Egidio Feruglio	Oxfordian	Cañadón Calcáreo Formation, Patagonia	Most of the dorsal vertebrae, a mostly complete pelvis, partial shoulder, most of a fore limb, and a femur		
Tendaguria tanzaniensis	Syntypes: MB.R.2092.1 (NB4) and MB.R.2092.2 (NB5)	Natural History Museum, Berlin	Tithonian	Upper Dinosaur Member, Tendaguru Formation, Tanzania	Two dorsal vertebrae	Syntypes are probably, but not definitely, from the same individual	
Tengrisaurus starkovi	ZIN PH 7/13	Russian Academy of Sciences	Valanginian	Murtoi Formation, Buryatia	Several vertebrae		
Tharosaurus indicus	RWR-241(A–K)	Indian Institute of Technology	Early Bathonian	Fort Member, Jaisalmer Formation, Rajasthan	Eleven cervical vertebrae		
Thecodontosaurus antiquus	Holotype: BCM 1 Neotype: BCM 2	Holotype destroyed, neotype is at the Bristol Museum & Art Gallery	Uncertain, possibly Rhaetian	Magnesian Conglomerate, England	Holotype: lower jaw Neotype: lower jaw	Type species of the family "Thecodontosauridae", holotype (also a lower jaw) was destroyed in WWII	
Tiamat valdecii	URFJ-DG 368-R, 527-R, 574-R, 591-R, 606-R, 625-R, 636-R, 638-R, 704-R	National Museum of Brazil	Albian or Cenomanian	Açu Formation, Ceará state	Nine caudal vertebrae		Diagram of the holotype material
Tienshanosaurus chitaiensis	IVPP AS 40002-3	Institute of Vertebrate Paleontology and Paleoanthropology	Oxfordian	Shishugou Formation, Xinjiang	Numerous vertebrae, partial hip and shoulder, and fragments of the femur, radius, and tibia		The holotype scapula on display in China
Titanomachya gimenezi	MPEF Pv 11547	Museum of Paleontology Egidio Feruglio	Maastrichtian	La Colonia Formation, Patagonia	Most of the hindlimbs, a humerus, hip fragments, and partial ribs and vertebrae		
Titanosaurus blanfordi	GSI 2195	Geological Society of India	Maastrichtian	Lameta Formation, Madhya Pradesh	A caudal vertebra	Generally considered a nomen dubium	Illustration of the holotype elements
Titanosaurus indicus	Plastotype: NHMUK 40867	Natural History Museum, London	Maastrichtian	Lameta Formation, Madhya Pradesh	One caudal vertebra	Type species of Titanosaurus and of the clades "Titanosauria", "Eutitanosauria", and "Titanosauriformes"; syntypes were never catalogued and are presumed lost, one of the syntypes was recovered and given a new genus name, Jainosaurus, generally considered a nomen dubium and a wastebasket taxon	An illustration of the plastotype from multiple views
Tonganosaurus hei	MCDUT 14454	Chengdu University of Technology Museum	Pliensbachian	Yimen Formation, Sichuan	Twenty vertebrae, a front limb and pectoral girdle, and a complete hind limb with partial hip		
Tornieria africana	Syntypes: SMNS 12141a, 12145a, 12143, 12140, 12142	Stuttgart State Museum of Natural History	Tithonian	Upper Dinosaur Member, Tendaguru Formation, Tanzania	Partial vertebra, rib fragment, partial hip, fibula, and a femur	Originally named Gigantosaurus, but the genus was preoccupied, subsequently referred to Ornithopsis and Barosaurus before being given its own genus	An illustration of one of the type caudal vertebrae
Traukutitan eocaudata	MUCPv 204	National University of Comahue	Santonian	Bajo de la Carpa Formation, Patagonia	Thirteen vertebrae and both femora		
Trigonosaurus pricei	MCT 1488-R	Museum of Earth Sciences Paleontology Collection	Maastrichtian	Serra da Galga Formation, Minas Gerais	Three vertebrae	Originally specimen MCT 1719-R was considered the paratype, but it has since been given its own genus, Caieiria, may be a junior synonym of Baurutitan	Holotype elements shown individually
Triunfosaurus leonardii	UFRJ-DG 498	Federal University of Rio de Janeiro	Berriasian	Rio Piranhas Formation, Paraíba	Three vertebrae, a partial hip, and several chevrons		
Tuebingosaurus maierfritzorum	GPIT-PV-30787	University of Tübingen	Norian	Trossingen Formation, Germany	Mostly complete hip and hind limb with several caudal vertebrae	Originally assigned to Gresslyosaurus and then to Plateosaurus before being given its own genus	Digital reconstruction of the holotype material
Turiasaurus riodevensis	Holotype: CPT-1195 to 1210 Paratype: CPT-1211 to CPT-1261	Holotype: Aragonese Museum of Paleontology Paratype: Museo de la Fundación Conjunto Paleontológico de Teruel-Dinópolis	Late Kimmeridgian	Villar del Arzobispo Formation, Spain	Holotype: articulated fore limb Paratype: skull fragments with teeth, several vertebrae, a partial hip and shoulder, and several hind limb elements		
Uberabatitan ribeiroi	CPPLIP-912, 1082, 1107	Federal University of Triângulo Mineiro	Maastrichtian	Serra da Galga Formation, Bauru Group, Minas Gerais	Tibia, fibula, and astragalus	All three specimens are from the same individual, so they are collectively a single holotype; previously more material was referred to the holotype, but it has since been excluded	
Udelartitan celeste	FC-DPV 3595	University of the Republic	Campanian or Maastrichtian	Guichón Formation, Uruguay	Three caudal vertebrae	More material was found at the same site, but it was disarticulated, and the holotype was limited to the articulated elements	
Uintasaurus douglassi	CM 11069	Carnegie Museum of Natural History	Tithonian	Brushy Basin Member, Morrison Formation, Utah	Five cervical vertebrae	Junior synonym of Camarasaurus lentus	
Ultrasauros mcintoshi	BYU 9044	Brigham Young University	Late Kimmeridgian	Brushy Basin Member, Morrison Formation, Colorado	One dorsal vertebra	Originally named Ultrasaurus before it was discovered that the name was preoccupied, now considered a junior synonym of Supersaurus	The holotype vertebra (left) next to a human for scale
Ultrasaurus tabriensis	DGBU-1973	Pusan National University	Late Albian or Early Aptian	Gugyedong Formation, Korea	Partial humerus	Generally considered a nomen dubium	
Unaysaurus tolentinoi	UFSM 11069	Federal University of Santa Maria	Norian (possibly younger)	Caturrita Formation, Rio Grande do Sul	A partial skull, most of the dorsal vertebrae, most of the tail, most of the dorsal ribs and gastralia, nearly complete fore limbs, and several bones of the lower hind limbs		A skeletal diagram of Unaysaurus, with known material in white
Vahiny depereti	UA 9940	University of Antananarivo	Maastrichtian	Maevarano Formation, Madagascar	Partial skull		
Venenosaurus dicrocei	DMNS 40932	Denver Museum of Nature and Science	Aptian	Poison Strip Sandstone Member, Cedar Mountain Formation, Utah	Numerous vertebrae, partial hips and shoulder, rib fragments, and limb elements		
Volgatitan simbirskiensis	UPM 976/1−7	Udory Paleontological Museum	Hauterivian	Unnamed formation, Ulyanovsk	Disarticulated caudal vertebrae		Diagram of the holotype material
Volkheimeria chubutensis	PVL 4077	National University of Tucumán	Toarcian	Cañadón Asfalto Formation, Patagonia	Disarticulated vertebrae, partial hip, femur, and tibia		
Vouivria damparisensis	MNHN.F.1934.6 DAM 1-42	National Museum of Natural History, France	Oxfordian	Calcaires de Clerval Formation, France	Partial skeleton without a skull		The holotype humerus shown from multiple views
Vulcanodon karibaensis	QG24	Natural History Museum of Zimbabwe	Sinemurian	Forest Sandstone Formation, Zimbabwe	Mostly complete pelvis and tail with limb elements and a partial shoulder	Type species of the family "Vulcanodontidae"	Diagram of the holotype material
Wamweracaudia karanjei	MB.R.2091.1–30, MB.R.3817.1 & MB.R.3817.2	Natural History Museum, Berlin	Tithonian	Tendaguru Formation, Tanzania	Numerous vertebrae from various parts of the spine		
Wintonotitan wattsi	QMF 729	Queensland Museum	Late Albian	Winton Formation, Queensland	Mostly complete forelimbs, dorsal and caudal vertebrae, partial hip, and several ribs		Diagram of the holotype with photos of the fossil material
Xenoposeidon proneneukos	BMNH R2095	Natural History Museum, London	Late Berriasian to Valanginian	Ashdown Formation, Wealden Group, England	One dorsal vertebra		Holotype shown from multiple views
Xianshanosaurus shijiagouensis	KLR-07-62	Henan Geological Museum	Albian or Aptian	Haoling Formation, Henan	Ten vertebrae, a femur, a partial shoulder, and several ribs		
Xingxiulong chengi	LFGT-D0002	Lufeng Dinosaur Museum	Hettangian	Shawan Member, Lufeng Formation, Yunnan	Mostly complete skull, numerous vertebrae, both hands, and several bones of the hind limb		
Xinjiangtitan shanshanensis	SSV12001	Shanshan Geological Museum	Callovian	Qiketai Formation, Xinjiang	Mostly complete vertebral column with mostly complete hind limbs and hips		Diagram of the holotype material with unknown elements in dark gray
Xixiposaurus suni	ZLJ01018	Jilin University	Hettangian	Lower Lufeng Formation, Yunnan	Mostly complete skeleton with a skull		
Yamanasaurus lojaensis	YM-UTPL 002, YM-INPC-014-017	Universidad Técnica Particular de Loja	Maastrichtian	Río Playas Formation, Ecuador	Humerus, ulna, tibia, and three vertebrae		
Yimenosaurus youngi	Holotype: YXV 8701 Paratype: YXV 8702	Yuxi Regional Administrative Academy	Pliensbachian	Fengjiahe Formation, Yunnan	Holotype: mostly complete skull with the lower jaw, several vertebrae, most of the hips, a femur, and a few ribs Paratype: most of the vertebrae, a partial shoulder, most of the hips and hind limbs, with a partial skull		
Yizhousaurus sunae	LFGT-ZLJ0033	Lufeng Dinosaur Museum	Sinemurian	Lufeng Formation, Yunnan	Complete skull with lower jaw, 31 vertebrae, shoulder and hip bones, both forelimbs, and both femora		
Yongjinglong datangi	GSGM ZH(08)-04	Gansu Geological Museum	Barremian	5 Formation, Upper Hekou Group, Gansu	Several vertebrae, a partial shoulder, and two fore limb bones		Diagram of the holotype material
Yuanmousaurus jiangyiensis	YMV 601	Yuanmou Museum	Uncertain, middle Jurassic	Zhanghe Formation, Yunnan	Numerous vertebrae and mostly complete limbs		
Yunnanosaurus huangi	IVPP V20	Institute of Vertebrate Paleontology and Paleoanthropology	Sinemurian	Upper Zhangjiawa Member, Lufeng Formation, Yunnan	Mostly complete skeleton	Type species of Yunnanosaurus	
Yunnanosaurus robustus	IVPP V93	Institute of Vertebrate Paleontology and Paleoanthropology	Sinemurian	Zhangjia'ao Member, Lufeng Formation, Yunnan	Almost complete skeleton		
Yunnanosaurus youngi	CXMVZA 185	Chuxiong Prefectural Museum	Pliensbachian	Upper Fengjiahe Formation, Yunnan	44 vertebrae and most of the hips		
Yunmenglong ruyangensis	41HIII-0006	Henan Geological Museum	Albian or Aptian	Haoling Formation, Henan	14 vertebrae and a femur		
Yuzhoulong qurenensis	CLGRP V00013	Chongqing Laboratory of Geoheritage Protection and Research	Bathonian	Shaximiao Formation, Sichuan	Partial skeleton with a mostly complete skull		
Zapalasaurus bonapartei	Pv-6127-MOZ	Museum of Dr. Juan A. Olsacher	Late Barremian	La Amarga Formation, Patagonia	Numerous vertebrae and a mostly complete hip		
Zby atlanticus	ML 368	Museu da Lourinhã	Kimmeridgian	Lourinhã Formation, Portugal	Mostly complete fore limb and other postcranial fragments	Originally referred to Turiasaurus	
Zhuchengtitan zangjiazhuangensis	ZJZ-57	Zhucheng Dinosaur Museum	Campanian	Boundary between Xingezhuang Formation and Hongtuya Formation, Wangshi Group, Shandong	A humerus		
Zigongosaurus fuxiensis	CV 02501	Chongqing Natural History Museum	Uncertain, middle Jurassic	Shaximiao Formation, Sichuan	Partial skull with jawbone	Considered by some to belong to the genus Mamenchisaurus	
Zizhongosaurus chuanchengensis	Syntypes: V9067.1, V9067.2, V9067.3	Institute of Vertebrate Paleontology and Paleoanthropology	Toarcian	Ziliujing Formation, Sichuan	A vertebra, humerus, and pubis	Specimens are most likely from the same animal, may be a nomen dubium	

== See also ==
- Lists of dinosaur type specimens
  - List of ornithopod type specimens
  - List of thyreophoran type specimens
  - List of marginocephalian type specimens
  - List of non-avian theropod type specimens
  - List of other ornithischian type specimens
- List of sauropod species
- List of informally named dinosaurs
