= Pachysauriscus =

Pachysauriscus Temporal range: Late Triassic (Norian), 227–204 Ma

Scientific classification
- Domain: Eukaryota
- Kingdom: Animalia
- Phylum: Chordata
- Clade: Dinosauria
- Clade: Saurischia
- Clade: †Sauropodomorpha
- Family: †Plateosauridae
- Genus: †Pachysauriscus; Kuhn, 1959

Type species
- †Pachysauriscus ajax von Huene, 1907-08

Synonyms
- Pachysaurops von Huene, 1961; Pachysaurus von Huene, 1907–1908

Genus of dinosaurs

Pachysauriscus is a genus of plateosaurian sauropodomorpha from the Late Triassic (Norian) of southern Germany. Although previously synonymized with Plateosaurus, a number of papers published since the early 2000s have cast doubt on this synonymy.

== Taxonomy ==
Pachysauriscus was originally named Pachysaurus by Friedrich von Huene in his 1908 monograph on Triassic dinosaurs from Europe. Two nominal species were described in the 1908 monograph, the type species P. ajax and P. magnus. Two more Pachysaurus species were named in a 1932 paper, P. wetzeli (also spelled as P. wetzelianus) and P. giganteus. The name Pachysaurus was later found to have been used for a monitor lizard, so Kuhn (1959) provided the replacement name Pachysauriscus. For his part, von Huene (1961) replaced Pachysaurus with Pachysaurops, in which case Pachysaurops is a junior objective synonym of Pachysauriscus.
