= Lufeng Dinosaur Museum =

Museum in Lufeng, China

Coordinates: 24°58′22″N 102°4′12″E

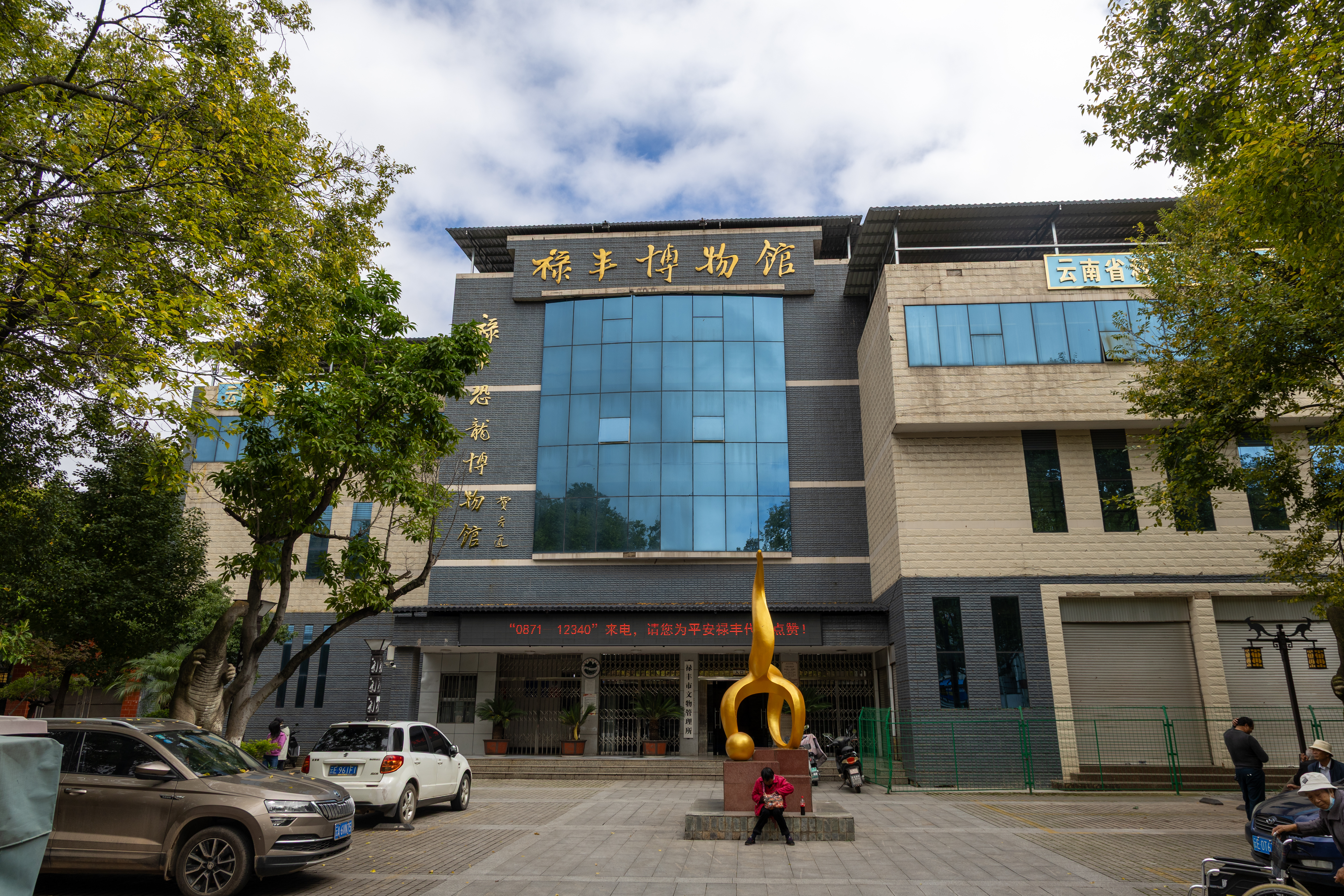
Lufeng Dinosaur Museum

The Lufeng Dinosaur Museum is located in Jingshan, Lufeng County, Yunnan Province, China. Lufeng is the site of numerous Jurassic dinosaur discoveries, first found there in 1938. Most well known is Lufengosaurus, a Jurassic prosauropod. More recently, teeth and a skull of Ramapithecus, a Miocene primate related to the orangutan, have been found in Lufeng.

The Lufeng Dinosaur Museum includes a hall of ancient living beings where four complete dinosaur skeletons ranging from 2.4 meters to 9 meters in length are on display. In addition, there is a display of photographs and diagrams of dinosaurs from around the world. The museum includes a hall of ancient bronzeware and earthenware and a hall of ancient Pithecanthropus.

== See also ==
- List of museums in China
