= Notochampsa =

Notochampsa Temporal range: Pliensbachian 185–183 Ma

Scientific classification
- Kingdom: Animalia
- Phylum: Chordata
- Class: Sauropsida
- Superorder: Crocodylomorpha
- Suborder: Notochampsoidea
- Family: Notochampsidae
- Genus: Notochampsa Broom, 1904

Species
- Notochampsa istedana Broom, 1904 (type)

Extinct genus of reptiles

Notochampsa is an extinct genus of protosuchian crocodyliform. Fossils have been found from the lower Clarens Formation of the Karoo Supergroup in South Africa, dating back to the Pliensbachian stage of the Early Jurassic. Notochampsa comes from a period of relative fossil scarcity, and is the youngest known occurrence of a crocodylomorph (and vertebrate body fossil) from the Karoo Basin of South Africa.

== Taxonomy ==
The genus was named in a paper published in 1904 by Robert Broom. The type species was named N. istedana, and a second species, named N. longipes, was also described. Later in 1924, N. longipes was given its own genus, Erythrochampsa. In that paper, Sidney Haughton created the family Notochampsidae for Notochampsa. Notochampsa was later used to include other genera of protosuchians such as Dyoplax, Pedeticosaurus, Platyognathus, and Protosuchus, and later Microchampsa and Orthosuchus. Notochampsa had also once been assigned to the suborder Sphenosuchia. A revision in 2021 found it valid taxon, and phylogenetic analysis recovered it as sister to Orthosuchus, in a monophyletic Notochampsidae. The cladogram below is from that study.

- Crocodyliformes
  - Notochampsoidea
    - Notochampsidae
      - Orthosuchus stormbergi
      - Notochampsa istedana
    - Protosuchidae
      - - Edentosuchus tienshanensis
        - Kayenta Form (UCMP 97638)
      - - Hemiprotosuchus leali
        - - Protosuchus haughtoni
          - Protosuchus richardsoni
  - - Gobiosuchidae
      - Gobiosuchus kielanae
      - Zaraasuchus shepardi
    - Mesoeucrocodylia
      - - Hsisosuchus chungkingensis
        - Metasuchia
      - Shartegosuchoidea
        - Sichuanosuchus shuhanensis
        - - Shantungosuchus hangjinensis
          - Zosuchus davidoni
          - Shartegosuchidae
            - Nominosuchus matunis
            - - Fruitachampsa callisoni
              - - Adzhosuchus fuscus
                - Shartegosuchus asperopalatum
