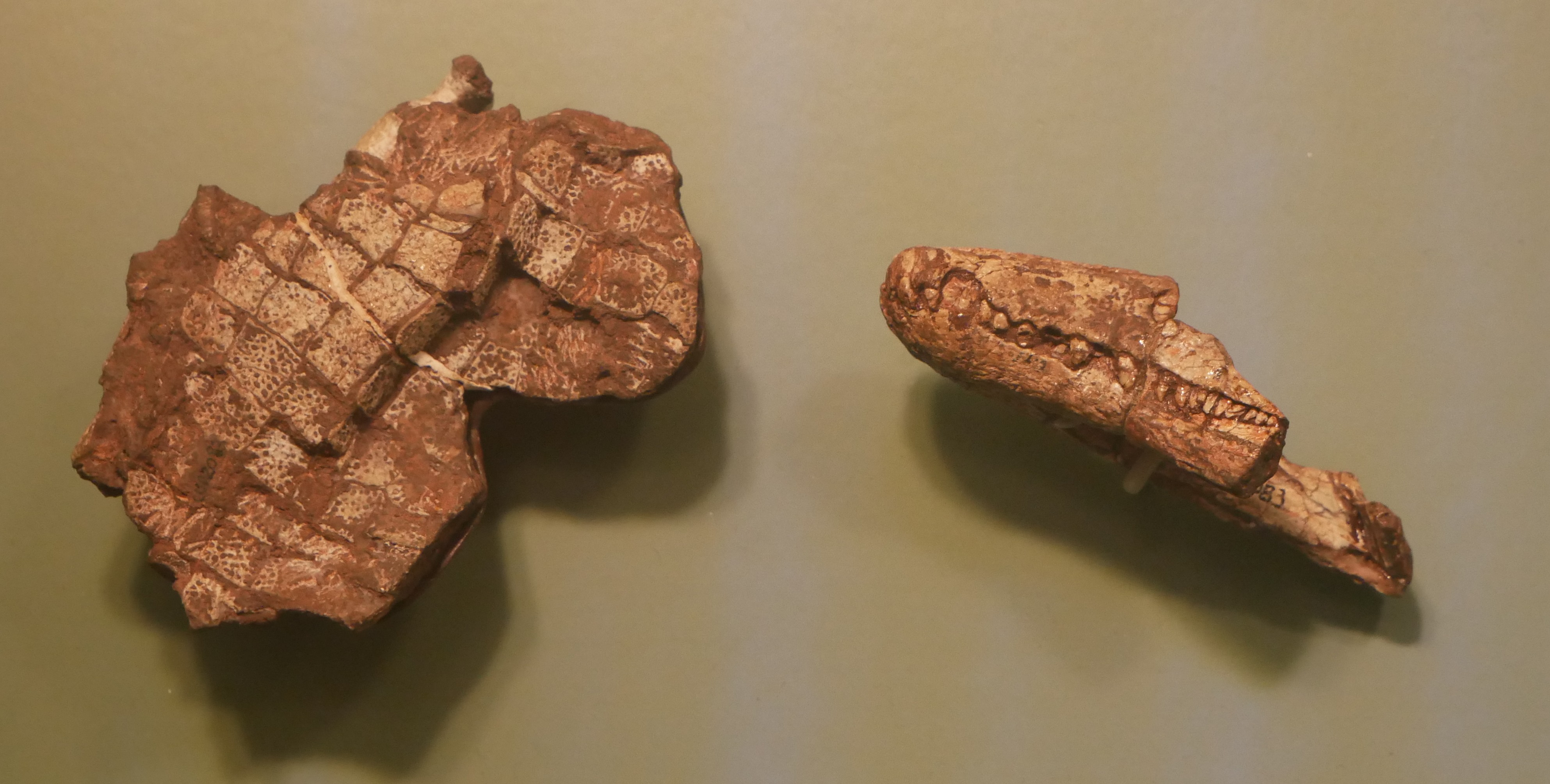
- Referred specimen (CUP 2083) in the Field Museum of Natural History

Scientific classification
- Kingdom: Animalia
- Phylum: Chordata
- Class: Reptilia
- Clade: Pseudosuchia
- Clade: Crocodylomorpha
- Superfamily: †Gobiosuchoidea
- Genus: †Platyognathus; Young, 1944
- Species: †P. hsui

Binomial name
- †Platyognathus hsui Young, 1944

= Platyognathus =

Platyognathus Temporal range: Sinemurian, 199–192 Ma

Extinct genus of reptiles

Platyognathus is an extinct genus of crocodyliform of the superfamily Gobiosuchoidea, representing the oldest representative of such, leaving a ghost lineage of aprox. 67 million years. Fossils are known from the Early Jurassic (Sinemurian) Zhangjiawa Member of the Lower Lufeng Formation in Yunnan, China and belong to the type and only species, P. hsui.

== Description ==
Platyognathus was a small crocodyliform, roughly the size of "protosuchians" like Protosuchus, with a skull about 5.6 cm long and an estimated body length of around 63 cm. Its well-preserved skeleton, though slightly compressed and cracked, includes a nearly complete skull, mandible, vertebrae, and parts of the limbs, with sculpted dorsal and ventral osteoderms suggesting a mature individual.

The skull features a tall, narrow rostrum, broader than Protosuchus but less abruptly widening than some relatives. The lower Canine tooth, with polygonal cross-sections due to ridges and grooves, extend high, occluding outside a premaxilla-maxilla notch. The antorbital fossa is medially walled, potentially reducing or eliminating the antorbital fenestra. The snout is narrow and shorter than the remainder of the skull, as indicated by the anterior position of the antorbital fenestra. The nares face forward, bordered mostly by the premaxillae, and the skull table is broad and flat, typical of crocodyliforms. The infratemporal fenestra is elongated and faces dorsolaterally, while the supratemporal fenestrae are obliquely oriented.

The mandible is long, with fused dentaries forming a quarter-length symphysis. A unique, narrow fenestra lies between the dentary and angular. The dentition includes four premaxillary teeth, up to 12 maxillary teeth (with serrations on some), and prominent caniniforms in the dentary. Paired caniniform teeth are not seen in any other described crocodyliform taxa, but they have been recorded from an unidentified crocodyliform from the Lower Jurassic Kayenta Formation and from a protosuchid from the Lower Jurassic McCoy Brook Formation in Nova Scotia. The vertebral column includes nine cervical and at least eight dorsal vertebrae, with articulated ribs and osteoderms. The limbs, including a nearly complete femur, humerus, and parts of the tibia, fibula, and tarsus, show slight bowing and robust articulations. Osteoderms are extensive, with sculpted dorsal ones wider than long and flat ventral ones, some possibly armoring the limbs.

== History and classification ==
=== Holotype ===
Platyognathus was first named by Chung-Chien Young in 1944 on the basis of a partial lower jaw found from the Dark Red Beds of the Lower Lufeng Formation in 1939. The material was first mentioned briefly four years earlier in a paper on Lufeng fossil vertebrates. The holotype jaw consisted of 11 alveoli (tooth sockets) on the left side and 12 alveoli on the right side, in addition to one broken caniniform tooth. Several diagnostic features were mentioned, including an expansion at the tip of the jaw, a tooth cross section that is octangular in outline, and a lateral constriction of the jaw behind the caniniform tooth, which is followed by an expansion further back. The anterior teeth are small and angled forward, while there is evidence in the jaw of at least two caniniform teeth that were larger and oriented obliquely and anteriorly. Further back in the jaw, the posterior teeth are about the same size and project vertically. The entire jaw is well ossified, and sutures between the bones could not be identified in the holotype. The symphysis, the point where the two sides of the jaw come together, is represented by a broad ventral groove.

Based on these features, Young found no close similarities between the jaw of Platyognathus and any other known early crocodylomorph such as Notochampsa, Sphenosuchus, Erythrochampsa, and Pedeticosaurus (at the time, these crocodylomorphs were collectively known as the "Pseudosuchia"). The jaw of Protosuchus richardsoni, described by Barnum Brown in 1933 from Arizona, is similar in size to that of Platyognathus, although it lacks many of the distinguishing features of the Asian form as described by Young. Because Platyognathus differed from any other known pseudosuchian, Young suggested that it may belong to its own family.

During World War II, the holotype was either lost or destroyed. The classification of the genus continued to be debated, as descriptions of the fragmentary jaw were all that was available to study. Platyognathus continued to be referred to Pseudosuchia in the following years, and was suggested to have a close relationship with Sphenosuchus. In 1955, it was suggested to have affinities with aetosaurs, and in 1956 Alfred Romer tentatively assigned it to the Notochampsidae (later synonymized with Protosuchidae).

=== New material ===
In 1965, additional specimens from the Lower Lufeng were referred to Platyognathus. It was placed in a new pseudosuchian family, the Platyognathidae, and was considered to be intermediate between Pseudosuchia and Protosuchia. Most later studies of Platyognathus were based on one specimen of the new material known as CUP 2083 which preserved the lower jaw. Some of these studies concluded that Platyognathus was a pseudosuchian related to Sphenosuchus and Pedeticosaurus, but most considered it to be a protosuchian. One 1986 study also considered the material to be from a protosuchian, but did not consider CUP 2083 to be from Platyognathus because the mandibular symphysis was elongate and unfused, unlike the holotype described by Young which was ossified. Later that year, a new paper also concluded that the newer material did not represent Platyognathus, but considered the specimens and Platyognathus to belong to different basal crocodyliform taxa of uncertain affinities. In that paper, the validity of P. hsui was questioned on the basis of Young's description of the holotype. In 2025, the most complete known mature specimen was reported, with the describers classifying the genus as a member of their new crocodyliform clade Gobiosuchoidea.

=== Neotype ===
In 1996, a newly described partial skull known as IVPP V8266 that was referable to Platyognathus was designated as a neotype. It was collected in 1984 from the Lower Lufeng in Yunnan. The authors of the paper that described the neotype agreed with the previous studies that the material described in 1965 does not belong to Platyognathus because CUP 2083 lacks many of the features of the holotype. In CUP 2083, the mandibular symphysis is unfused, there is a single caniniform tooth in the dentary, and there is no groove along the symphysis. This contrasts with the holotype, which has a fused symphysis, at least two caniniform teeth, and a conspicuous trough along the symphysis. The authors also mention that the holotype and CUP 2083 come from two different strata within the "Dark Red Beds" of the Lower Lufeng; the holotype is from stratum 6 of the Dahuangtian locality while CUP 2083 is from stratum 5 of the Dadi locality, about 400m southeast of the Dahuangtian locality. This shows that the two specimens are from different horizons and are likely to belong to different taxa.

The new skull revealed an additional diagnostic feature of Platyognathus that distinguishes it from other protosuchians: the distinctive curvature of the jugal. Additional diagnostic characters were proposed by the authors, but their character-states cannot be determined in other protosuchian taxa. These characters include a width of the mandibular symphysis across the swellings of the caniniform teeth that is almost equal to the anteroposterior length of the symphysis and an anterolateral process of the ectopterygoid with an inverted V-shaped ridge on the dorsal surface. The shortness of the snout relative to the rest of the skull and the presence of a laterally and ventrally open notch between the premaxilla and maxilla indicate that Platyognathus is a member of Protosuchia as defined by Wu et al. (1994). Because the infratemporal fenestra of Platyognathus is very small and the mandibular symphysis extends posteriorly to the level of the seventh to ninth tooth, the genus is thought to be more derived than Orthosuchus. The authors of the description of the neotype suggested that Platyognathus may be closely related to the clade containing Protosuchidae and Shantungosuchus because it possesses a dentary tooth that fits into a notch between the premaxilla and maxilla. Because Platyognathus is known from such incomplete material, there is yet to be an adequate cladistic analyses that can determine a phylogenetic position for Platyognathus within Protosuchia.

An unnamed mesosuchian from the Salt Wash Member of the Late Jurassic Morrison Formation of western Colorado in the United States possesses several features that are also seen in Platyognathus. The dentition of the mesosuchian is similar to that of Platyognathus and like Platyognathus, the dentary is laterally expanded. However, the dentary of the unnamed mesosuchian is much broader and spatulate.
