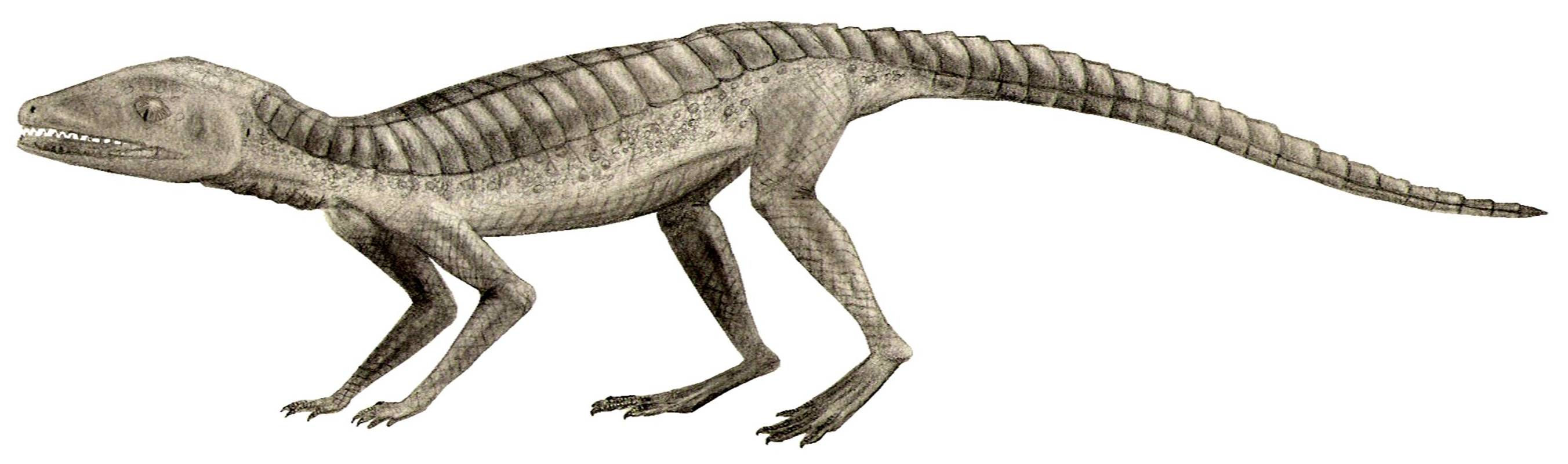
- Life restoration of Hoplosuchus kayi

Scientific classification
- Kingdom: Animalia
- Phylum: Chordata
- Class: Reptilia
- Clade: Pseudosuchia
- Clade: Crocodylomorpha
- Family: †Protosuchidae
- Genus: †Hoplosuchus; Gilmore, 1926

Type species
- †H. kayi Gilmore, 1926

= Hoplosuchus =

Hoplosuchus Temporal range: Late Jurassic
- Skeletal reconstruction and size comparison of the holotype

Extinct genus of reptiles

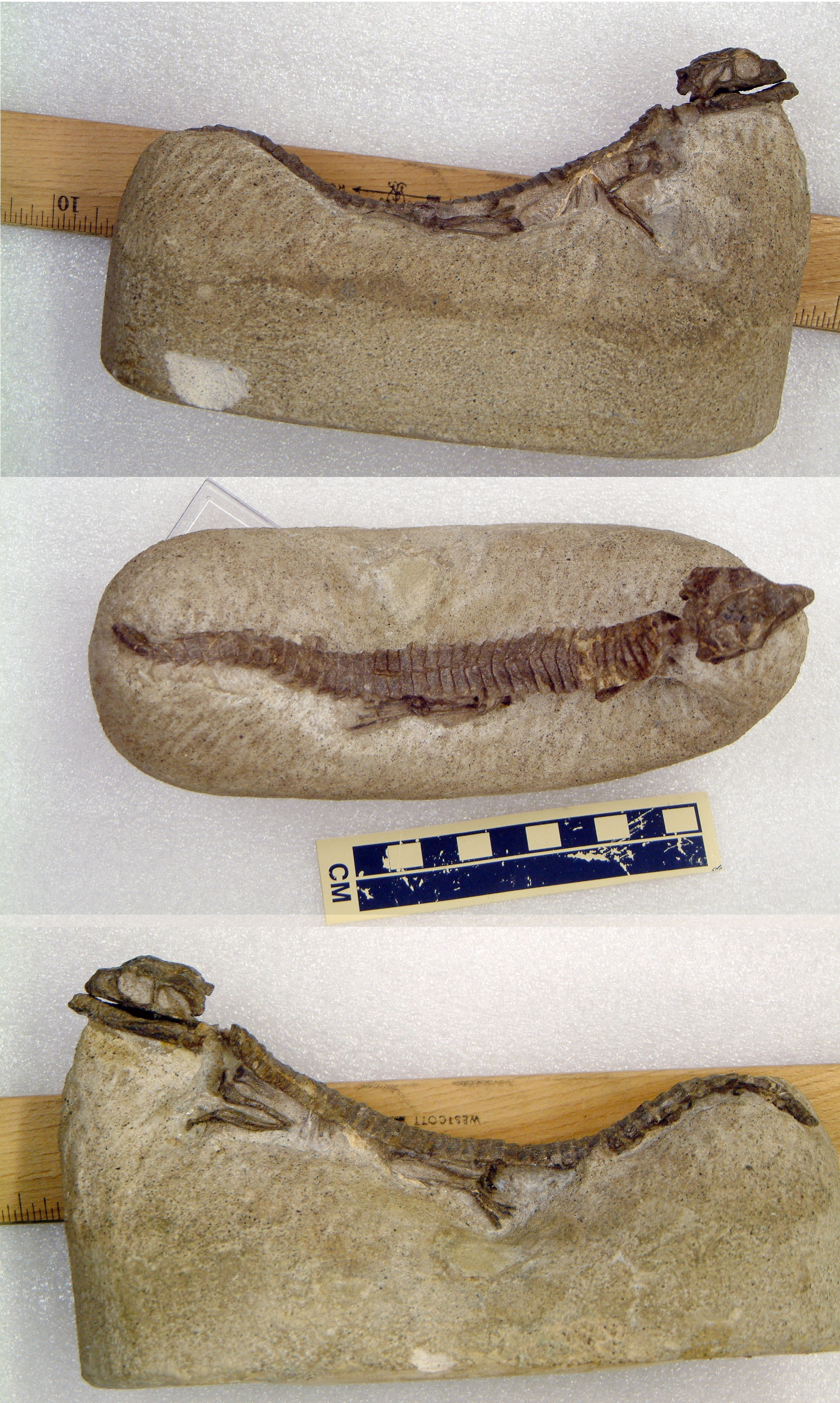
Holotype fossil

Hoplosuchus is a genus of crocodyliform belonging to Protosuchidae. It is so far only known definitely from one specimen, a skeleton collected from sandstone of the Upper Jurassic-age Morrison Formation rocks at Dinosaur National Monument, Utah, during road construction. The individual was small, approximately 20 centimetres (7.9 in) long, although it may have been very young. It is the basalmost crocodyliform of the Morrison Formation, as suggested by such attributes as still having antorbital fenestrae in the skull. The limbs were relatively long, suggesting that the animal was terrestrial. Two rows of wide, rectangular bony scutes ran down the back. The crowns of the teeth are not well preserved, so the diet cannot be determined with certainty. Given its small size, it probably ate insects and small vertebrates; it may have been carnivorous or omnivorous.

== Classification ==
Charles W. Gilmore named Hoplosuchus in 1926; the type species is H. kayi. He described it as an aetosaur, a type of armored herbivorous archosaur related to the crocodylomorphs now known to have been extinct at the end of the Triassic, but it was later reevaluated as a crocodylomorph itself. Sometimes classified as an atoposaurid, a 1988 review of atoposaurids found it more likely to be a protosuchian-grade crocodylomorph. A potential second specimen has been recovered from the Morrison Formation of northeastern Arizona; this individual would have been about 50 centimetres (20 in), but the skull is poorly preserved and it remains undescribed, leaving the identity of the animal unknown. A 2017 cladistic analysis of Cassissuchus recovered it as a member of Protosuchidae.
