= Los Colorados Formation =

Argentinian sedimentary rock formation

- Stratigraphic range: Norian; ~227–213 Ma
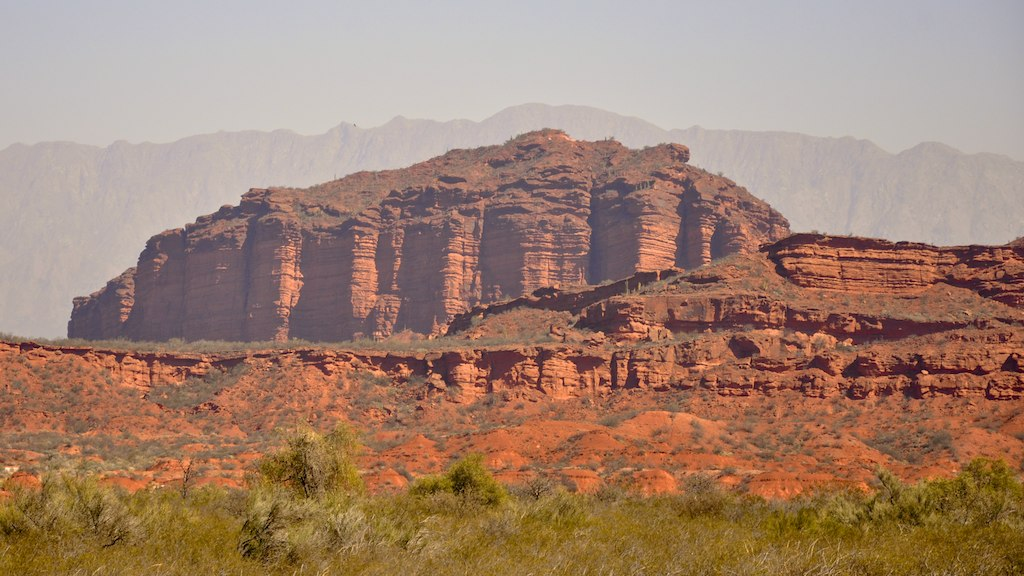
- Los Colorados massif, La Rioja Province, Argentina
- Type: Geological formation
- Unit of: Agua de la Peña Group
- Underlies: Cerro Rajado Formation
- Overlies: Ischigualasto Formation
- Thickness: 600 m (2,000 ft)

Lithology
- Primary: Sandstone, siltstone, mudstone
- Other: Conglomerate, gypsum

Location
- Coordinates: 29.8°S 67.9°W
- Approximate paleocoordinates: 38.9°S 31.4°W
- Region: San Juan Province; La Rioja Province
- Country: Argentina
- Extent: Ischigualasto-Villa Unión Basin

Type section
- Named for: Los Colorados Massif
- Los Colorados Formation (Argentina)

The Los Colorados Formation is a sedimentary rock formation of the Ischigualasto-Villa Unión Basin, found in the provinces of San Juan and La Rioja in Argentina. The formation dates back to the Norian age of the Late Triassic.

The up to 600 metres (2,000 ft) thick formation comprises sandstones, siltstones, mudstones and conglomerates with gypsum layers deposited in a fluvial to lacustrine environment. The formation is the uppermost stratigraphic unit of the Agua de la Peña Group, overlying the Lagerstätte of the Ischigualasto Formation. Los Colorados Formation is partly covered by the Cretaceous Cerro Rajado Formation, separated by an unconformity.

The formation is known for its fossils of early dinosaurs, including the coelophysoid Zupaysaurus and the "prosauropods" Coloradisaurus, Lessemsaurus, and Riojasaurus. Magnetostratigraphic analysis suggests that the Los Colorados Formation was deposited between 227 and 213 million years ago.

== Description ==
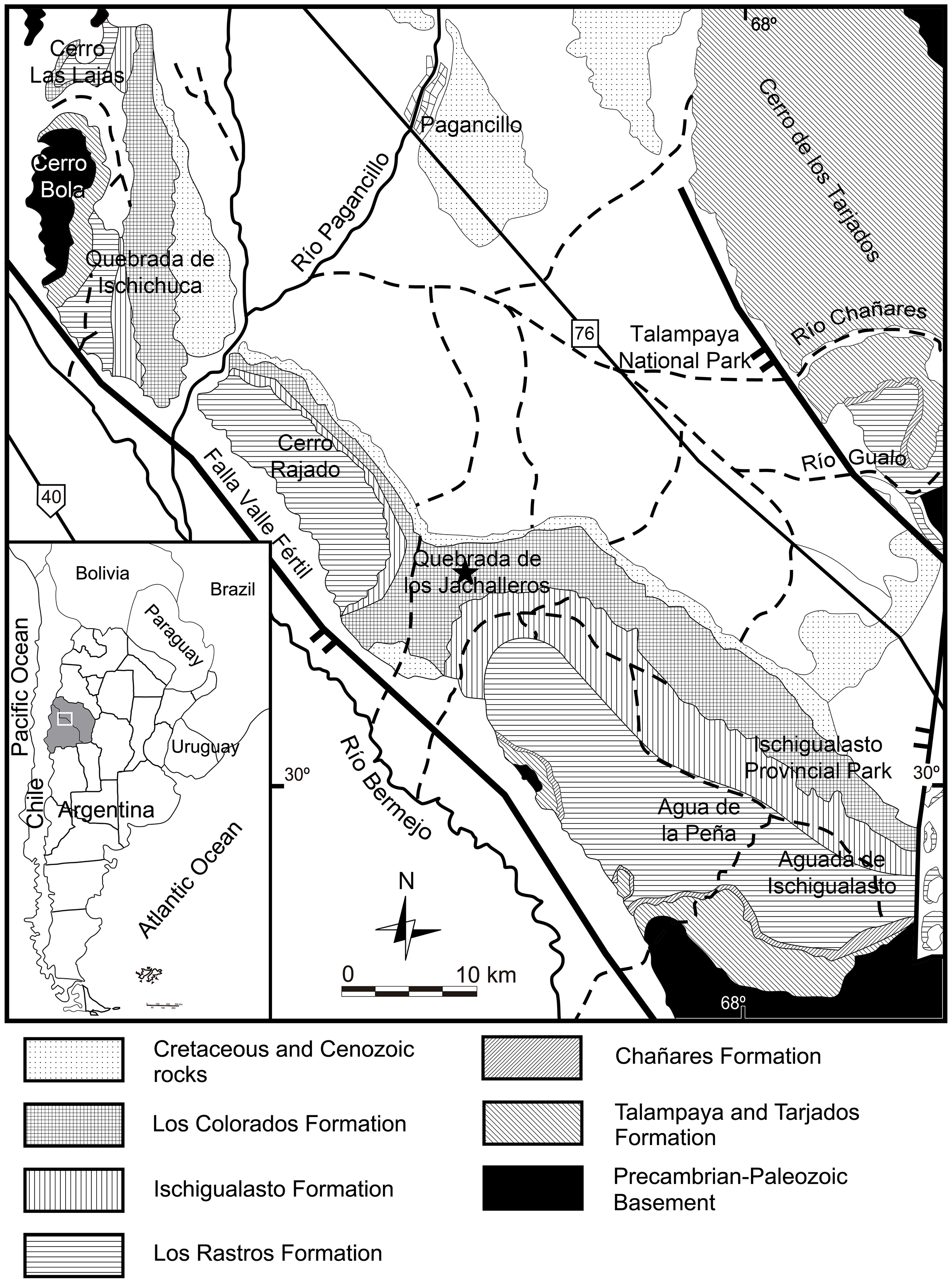
Extent of formations in the Ischigualasto-Villa Unión Basin

Los Colorados Formation is a unit with an approximate thickness of 600 metres (2,000 ft) of the Agua de la Peña Group in the Ischigualasto-Villa Unión Basin, where it is exposed in the Ischigualasto Provincial Park, a World Heritage Site in Argentina. The formation gradually overlies the Ischigualasto Formation and is unconformably overlain by the Cretaceous Cerro Rajado Formation. The formation comprises red-colored, fine- to medium-grain–size sandstones together with siltstones and ancillary floodplain mudstones with early calcisol development. The formation was deposited in a fluvial to lacustrine environment.

== Fossil content ==
=== Synapsids ===
Synapsids of Los Colorados Formation
| Genus | Species | Location | Material | Notes | Images |
|---|---|---|---|---|---|
| Chaliminia | C. musteloides | | | A tritheledontid cynodont. | |
| Jachaleria | J. colorata | | A skull and complete jaws. | A large stahleckeriiddicynodont, also found in the uppermost layers of the Ischigualasto Formation. | |
| Tessellatia | T. bonapartei | | A partial skull, including the snout, orbital region, and lower jaws. | A probainognathian cynodont. | |

=== Archosauromorphs ===
==== Non-crocodylomorph pseudosuchians ====
Non-crocodylomorph pseudosuchians of Los Colorados Formation
| Genus | Species | Location | Material | Notes | Images |
|---|---|---|---|---|---|
| Fasolasuchus | F. tenax | La Rioja Province | A fragmented skull and jaws. | A large predatory loricatan (traditionally known as a "rauisuchian"). | |
| Neoaetosauroides | N. engaeus | Quebrada de los Jachaleros, El Salto (San Juan) | | An early desmatosuchine aetosaur with adaptations for a diet of small animals. | |
| Olkasuchus | O. walasto | | An incomplete axial skeleton, partial pectoral and pelvic girdles, partial forelimb and hindlimb, and both articulated and isolated osteoderms. | An early desmatosuchine aetosaur | |
| Riojasuchus | R. tenuisceps | | Four specimens, including two nearly complete skeletons | An ornithosuchid, one of the last and most complete members of its family. | |

==== Crocodylomorpha ====
Crocodylomorphs of the Los Colorados Formation
| Genus | Species | Location | Material | Notes | Images |
|---|---|---|---|---|---|
| Coloradisuchus | C. abelini | La Rioja Province | | A protosuchid | |
| Hemiprotosuchus | H. leali | Quebrada de los Jachaleros, El Salto (San Juan) | | A protosuchid | |
| Pseudhesperosuchus | P. jachaleri | Quebrada de los Jachaleros, El Salto (San Juan) | | A "sphenosuchian" (slender early crocodylomorph) | |

==== Dinosaurs ====
Indeterminate theropod remains present in the Provincia de la Rioja.

Dinosaurs of the Los Colorados Formation
| Genus | Species | Location | Material | Notes | Images |
|---|---|---|---|---|---|
| Coloradisaurus | C. brevis | La Rioja Province | Skull, adult | A massospondylid sauropodomorph | |
| Lessemsaurus | L. sauropoides | La Rioja Province | Partial cervical, dorsal, and sacral vertebrae, adult | A lessemsaurid sauropodiform | |
| Prosauropoda | Indeterminate | La Rioja & San Juan Provinces | Includes Strenusaurus procerus. Dorsals, caudals, partial fore- and hindlimb. | Indeterminate fossils of "prosauropods" (early sauropodomorphs) | |
| Powellvenator | P. podocitus | Ischigualasto-Villa Unión Basin | Known from previously undescribed partial hindlimbs | A coelophysoid theropod | |
| Riojasaurus | R. incertus | La Rioja Province | | A sauropodomorph | |
| Zupaysaurus | Z. rougieri | La Rioja Province | | An early theropod | |

=== Other reptiles ===
Other reptiles of Los Colorados Formation
| Genus | Species | Location | Material | Notes | Images |
|---|---|---|---|---|---|
| Coloradosphenodon | C. lahni | La Esquina locality, La Rioja Province | A partial skull | An early rhynchocephalian | |
| Palaeochersis | P. talampayensis | | | A testudinatan (early turtle) in the family Australochelyidae. | |

=== Ichnofossils ===
- cf. Brachychirotherium sp.
- Chirotherium sp.

== See also ==
- List of dinosaur-bearing rock formations
- Quebrada del Barro Formation, contemporaneous fossiliferous formation of the Marayel-El Carrizal Basin just southeast of the Ischigualasto-Villa Unión Basin
- Caturrita Formation, contempeoraneous fossiliferous formation of the Paraná Basin, southeastern Brazil
- Chinle Formation, contemporaneous fossiliferous formation of Arizona
- Elliot Formation, contemporaneous fossiliferous formation of the Karoo Basin, South Africa
- Fremouw Formation, contemporaneous fossiliferous formation of Antarctica
