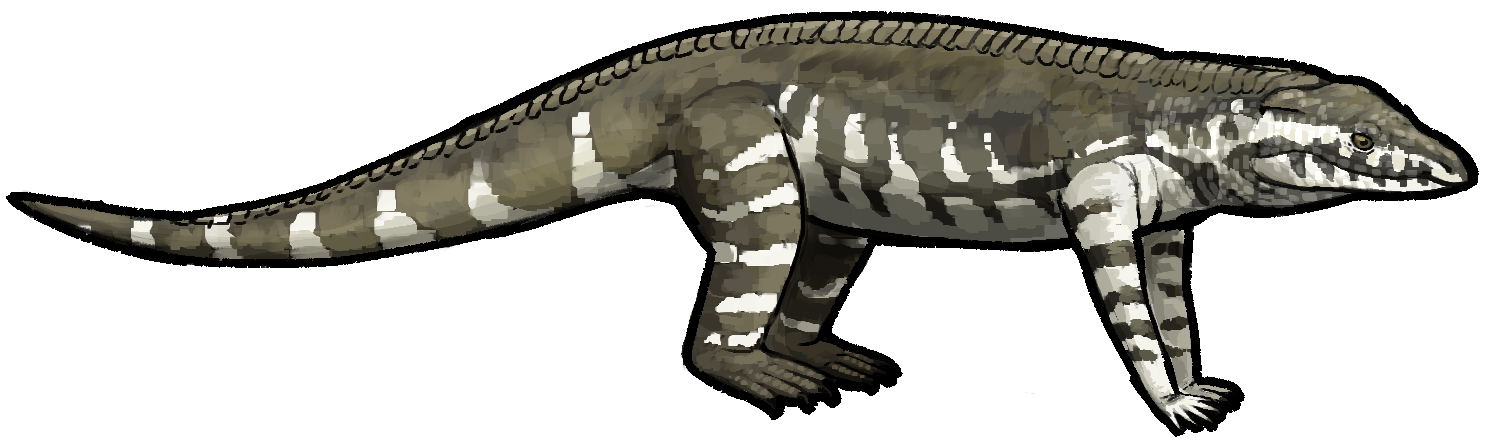
- Life restoration

Scientific classification
- Kingdom: Animalia
- Phylum: Chordata
- Class: Reptilia
- Clade: Archosauria
- Clade: Pseudosuchia
- Clade: Crocodylomorpha
- Family: †Protosuchidae
- Genus: †Coloradisuchus
- Species: †C. abelini

Binomial name
- †Coloradisuchus abelini Martínez et al. 2019

= Coloradisuchus =

Coloradisuchus Temporal range: Late Triassic

Extinct genus of reptiles

Coloradisuchus is an extinct genus of protosuchid crocodyliform known from the Late Triassic Los Colorados Formation in Argentina. It contains a single species, Coloradisuchus abelini.
