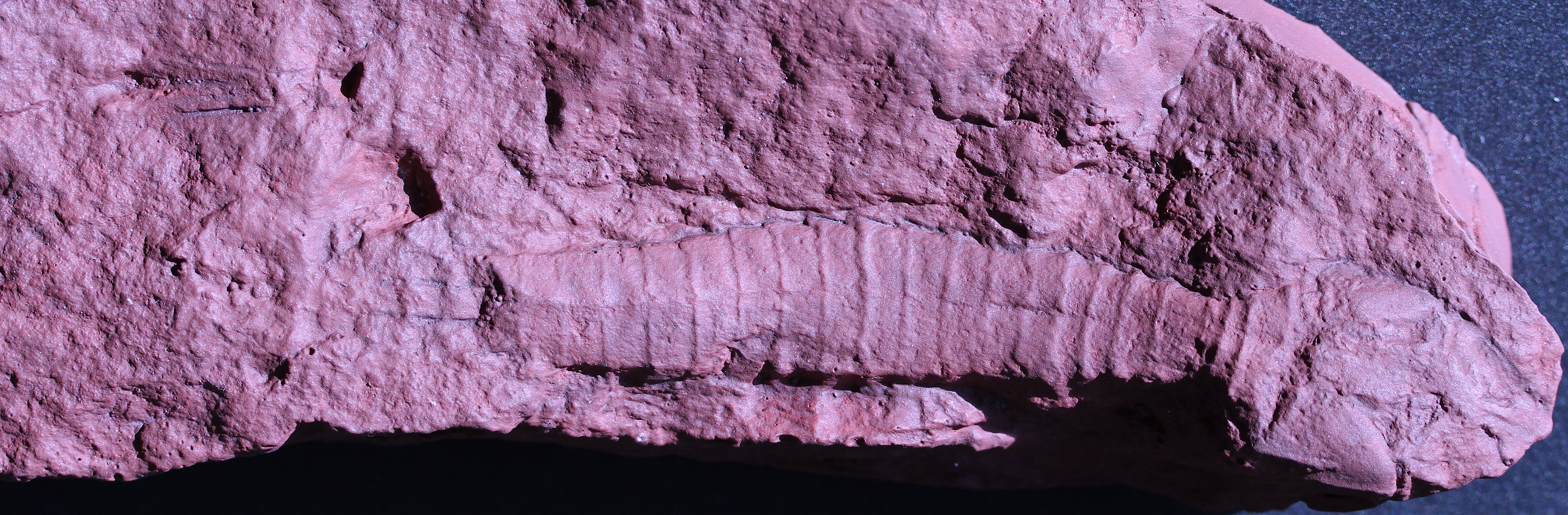
- Stegomosuchus longipes skeleton replica

Scientific classification
- Kingdom: Animalia
- Phylum: Chordata
- Class: Reptilia
- Clade: Pseudosuchia
- Clade: Crocodylomorpha
- Informal group: †Protosuchia
- Genus: †Stegomosuchus von Huene, 1922

Species
- S.longipes (Emerson & Loomis, 1904 [originally Stegomus longipes]) (type)

= Stegomosuchus =

Stegomosuchus Temporal range: Early Jurassic (Hettangian)

Extinct genus of reptiles

Stegomosuchus is an extinct genus of small protosuchian crocodyliform. It is known from a single incomplete specimen discovered in the late 19th century in Lower Jurassic rocks of south-central Massachusetts, United States. It was originally thought to be a species of Stegomus, an aetosaur (a type of armored herbivorous reptile), but was eventually shown to be related to Protosuchus and thus closer to the ancestry of crocodilians. Stegomosuchus is also regarded as a candidate for the maker of at least some of the tracks named Batrachopus in the Connecticut River Valley.

== Discovery ==
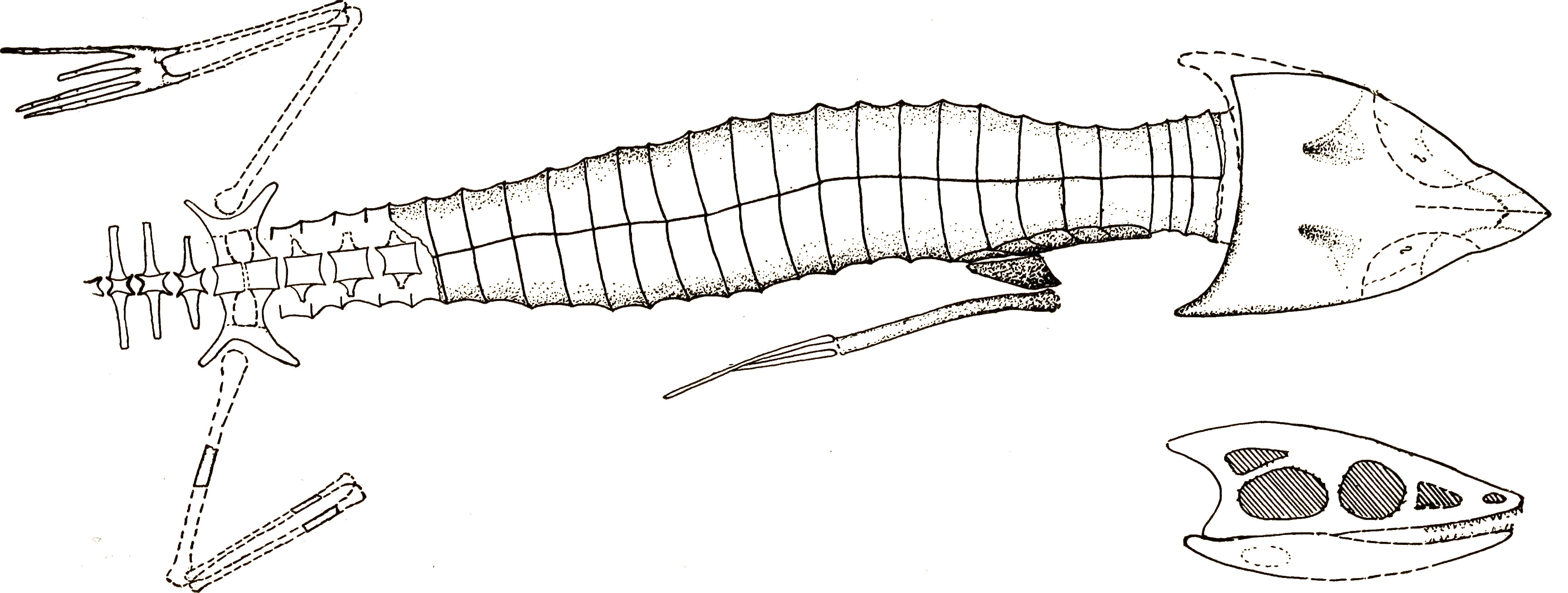
Stegomosuchus holotype

The holotype and only known specimen of Stegomosuchus (AM 900) was discovered at what was then known as the Hines Quarry, east of East Longmeadow, Massachusetts, just before the turn of the 20th century. It was found 10 feet (3.0 m) below the surface, in red sandstone used for building material. This site is now called the Hoover Quarry; it has also yielded invertebrate trace fossils and dinosaur tracks (Eubrontes). The rocks are now known to belong to the Portland Formation. While thought to be Triassic when Stegomosuchus was originally described, the Portland Formation is now known to date to the Early Jurassic, namely the late Hettangian stage (approximately 200.5 to 200 million years ago).

Its discoverer, G. B. Robinson, took home the blocks containing the specimen and placed them in his door yard, where they were exposed to the elements for "about seven years." The fossil was then found and obtained by Mr. and Mrs. E. D. White, and the specimen was then described by B. K. Emerson and F. B. Loomis in 1904. At that point, the specimen was in three blocks. The bones had been largely preserved as impressions, and the two main blocks had upper and lower impressions of the skull, twenty-eight pairs of armor plates situated along the spine up to the pelvis, right arm (minus the hand) and shoulder blade, and left foot. Emerson and Loomis interpreted the impressions as showing another row of armor along the sides, but this was later shown to be a mistake. AM 900 was a small animal, with a skull estimated at 35 millimetres (1.4 in) long and 27 millimetres (1.1 in) across, and a body length from snout to pelvis of 149 millimetres (5.9 in). Emerson and Loomis described the specimen as a new species of Stegomus (S. longipes), an aetosaur known from slightly older rocks.

== Classification ==
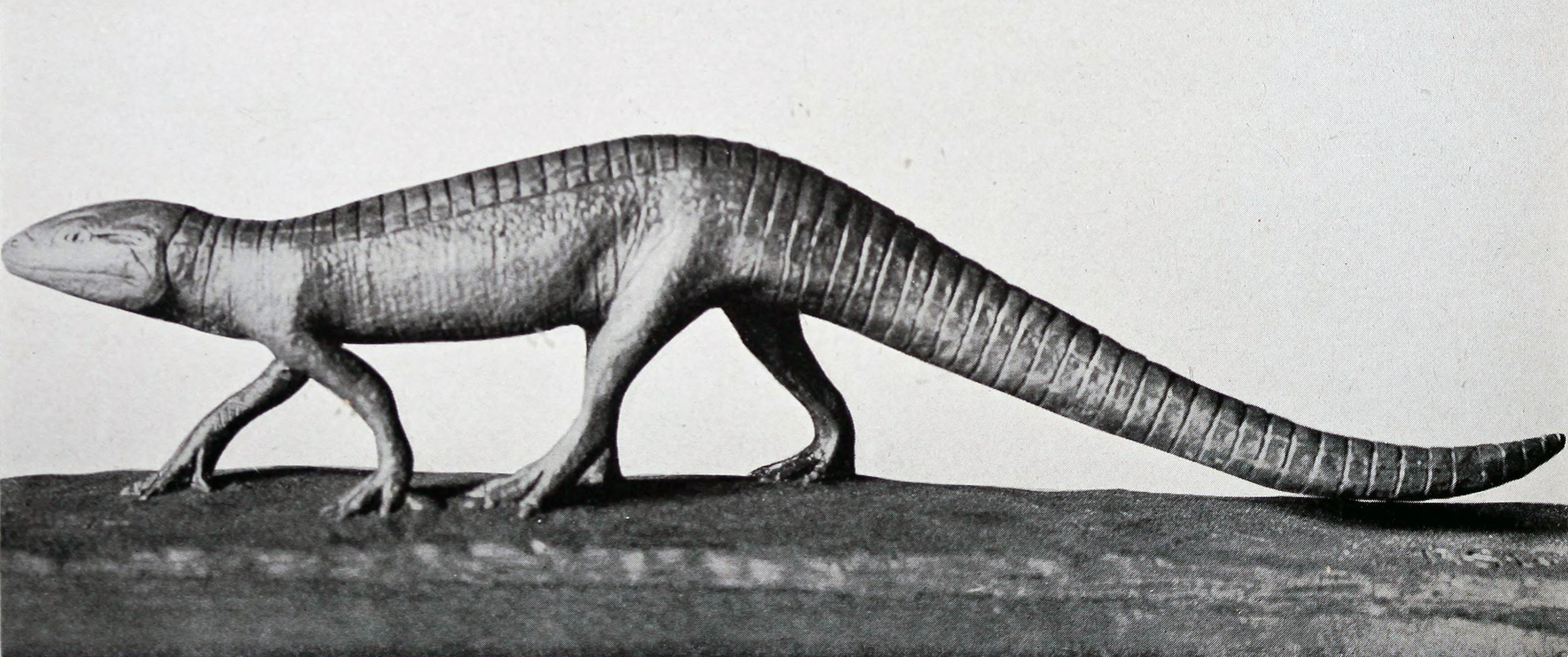
Model by Richard Swann Lull

The assessment of the material as belonging to a species of the aetosaur Stegomus held for about twenty years, until Friedrich von Huene reclassified it, giving the species the new genus Stegomosuchus and new family Stegomosuchidae, in the Pseudosuchia.

Its classification was further reassessed by Alick Walker over forty-five years later, who reinterpreted Stegomosuchus as a close relative of Protosuchus, a crocodile-like reptile of similar age. In making this change, he noted that Stegomosuchidae should have priority over Protosuchidae. He also regarded AM 900 as a juvenile. The reassignment of Stegomosuchus was followed, although Alfred Romer recommended passing over Stegomosuchidae for the more familiar Protosuchidae. Whetstone and Whybrow (1983) agreed that a protosuchian identity was probable, but found AM 900 too poorly preserved and lacking too many important parts of the body to classify further.

== Paleobiology ==
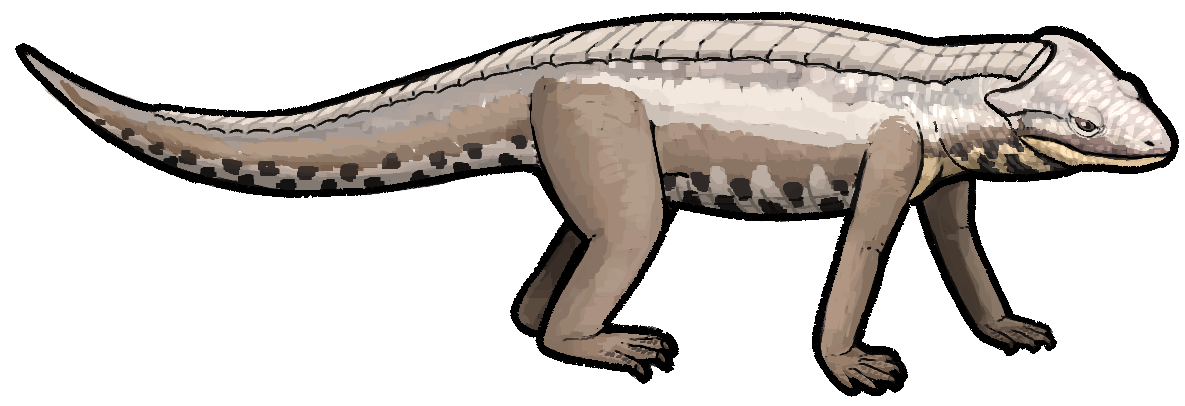
Reconstruction

By comparison to other protosuchids, Stegomosuchus was probably a terrestrial carnivore. The complete preservation of the skeleton, in spite of the high-energy riverine environment it was deposited in, suggests that it almost certainly had a burrowing lifestyle.

In the same issue of The American Journal of Science that contained the description of Stegomus longipes, Richard Swann Lull published a short article in which he proposed that S. longipes had produced previously known tracks named Batrachopus gracilis, also from the Connecticut River Valley. This assessment has been followed, although the ichnospecies assigned to Batrachopus have since been consolidated; B. deweyi is now the name for the tracks in question.

== Paleoenvironment ==
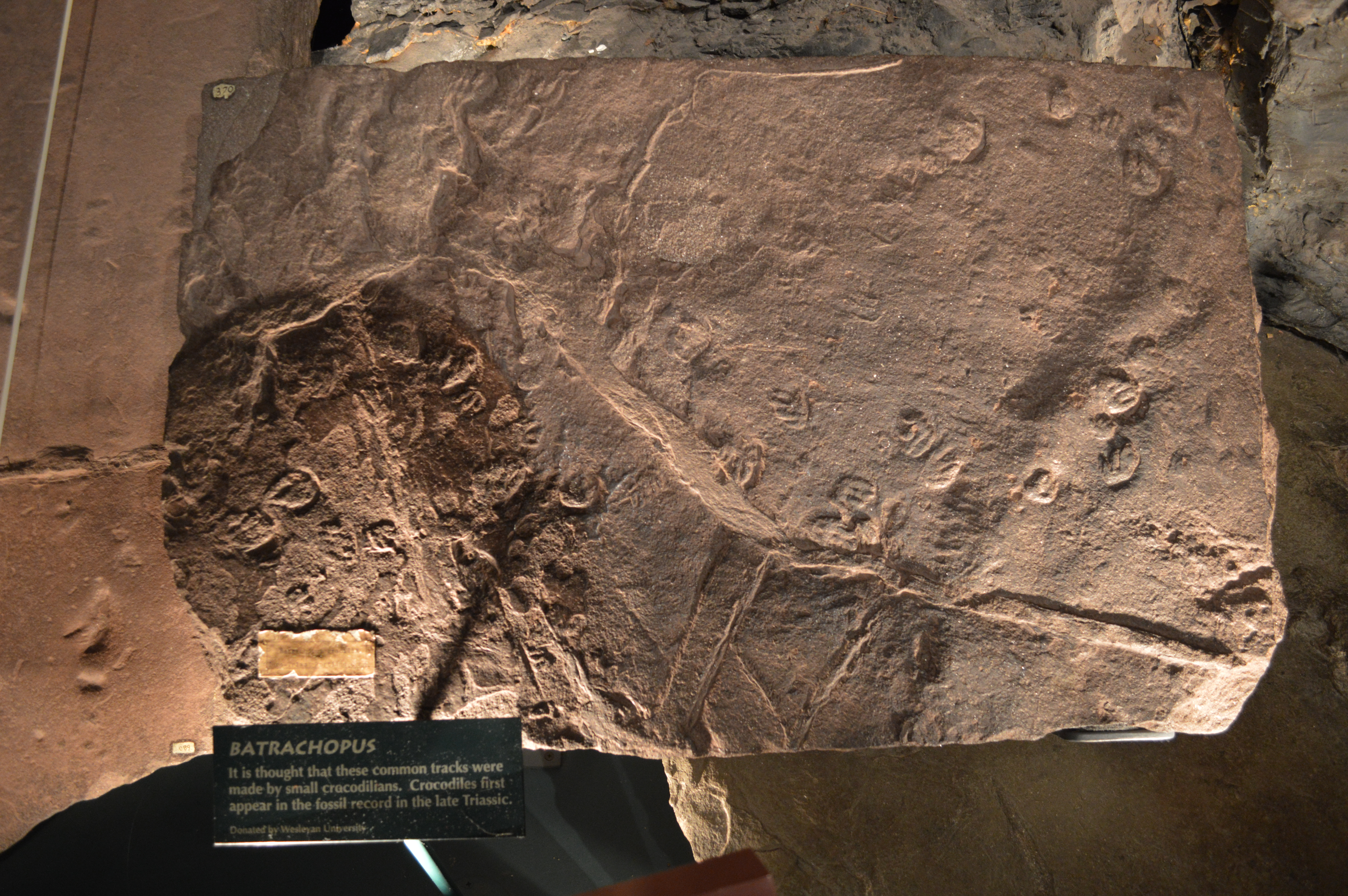
Batrachopus tracks, made by an animal like Stegomosuchus

The Hoover Quarry may represent a playa, or dry lake, a shallow lake, or a river setting. The Portland Formation as a whole is composed of reddish shallow–water and gray or black deeper water rocks in the lower part of the formation, and coarser red rocks from river or alluvial settings in the upper part of the formation. It has yielded fossils of algal structures, pollen, trees and smaller plants, bivalves, clam shrimp, ostracodes, beetles, invertebrate traces, several genera of fish (Acentrophorus, Redfieldius, Semionotus, and the coelacanth Diplurus), the theropod dinosaur Podokesaurus, the sauropodomorph dinosaur Anchisaurus, vertebrate coprolites (fossilized droppings), and several vertebrate track genera (Batrachopus, the theropod tracks Anchisauripus, Eubrontes, and Grallator, the prosauropod tracks Otozoum, and the ornithischian dinosaur tracks Anomoepus).
