= Microchampsa =

Microchampsa Temporal range: Early Jurassic

Scientific classification
- Kingdom: Animalia
- Phylum: Chordata
- Class: Reptilia
- Clade: Archosauria
- Clade: Pseudosuchia
- Clade: Crocodylomorpha
- Informal group: †Protosuchia
- Genus: †Microchampsa; Young, 1951

Species
- M. scutata Young, 1951 (type)

Extinct genus of reptiles

Microchampsa is an extinct genus of protosuchian crocodyliform that existed during the Early Jurassic. Fossils have been found from stratum 6 of the Dahuangtian locality, an outcrop of the Lower Red Beds of the Lufeng Formation in Yunnan, China.

== Description ==
Parts of the postcranial skeleton, such as the dorsal osteoderms, vertebrae, ribs, and bones of the manus, are known. The dorsal osteoderms of the lumbar region are fused to double headed ribs. All osteoderms are rectangular and overlap each other.

== History ==
Microchampsa was named in 1951 on the basis of an incomplete skeleton consisting of cervical and anterior dorsal vertebrae as well as ribs and three rows of dorsal osteoderms. Three other specimens of crocodylomorphs described in 1965 also seemed to display three rows of osteoderms, and as a result were assigned to the genus Microchampsa. However, later studies revealed that the specimens had only two rows of osteoderms that more closely resembled those of the genus Platyognathus, and that the presence of three rows of osteoderms in the holotype of Microchampsa may have been an artifact of preservation. However, this hypothesis is speculative as the holotype of Microchampsa had since been lost by the time of the studies.

== Taxonomy ==
It was assigned to the suborder Protosuchia in 1965 and the family Notochampsidae in 1992. However, later studies argued that it is a nomen dubium due to the lack of diagnostic material in the incompletely known remains. Thus it can only be regarded as a poorly known protosuchian.
