= Erythrochampsa =

Erythrochampsa Temporal range: Early Jurassic

Scientific classification
- Kingdom: Animalia
- Phylum: Chordata
- Class: Reptilia
- Clade: Pseudosuchia
- Clade: Crocodylomorpha
- Family: †Protosuchidae
- Genus: †Erythrochampsa; Haughton, 1924

Type species
- Notochampsa longipes (Broom, 1904)

Extinct genus of reptiles

Erythrochampsa ("red crocodile") is an extinct genus of protosuchian crocodyliform from the Early Jurassic. Fossils have been found from the Red Beds of the Stormberg Group, the youngest group of strata from the Karoo Supergroup outcropping in South Africa.

== Description ==
Material from E. longipes, the type (and only) species of Erythrochampsa, was originally referred to the genus Notochampsa in 1904 along with specimens of another species named N. istedana. However, certain features of material from this species, such as divided external nares, have been considered to be indications of a position within Pseudosuchia rather than Crocodilia as was originally supposed. Despite this, the material of N. longipes remained highly suggestive of a crocodilian, and thus the species was eventually placed within its own distinct genus, Erythrochampsa, in 1924. It was placed in the family Notochampsidae, and was considered closely related to Notochampsa, whose position within Crocodylomorpha had been reconsidered to be intermediate between "thecodonts" and crocodilians. The family Notochampsidae is now known as Protosuchidae

There is no skull present in the material associated with the genus, making further classification rather difficult. Although the postcranial skeleton is quite fragmentary, the pelvis clearly shows of its relations to other crocodilians by the absence of the pubis in the acetabular border. Features of the pelvis as well as the hind limb and pes bore a close resemblance to early crocodyliformes such as Protosuchus, used as evidence of its relations as a protosuchid.
