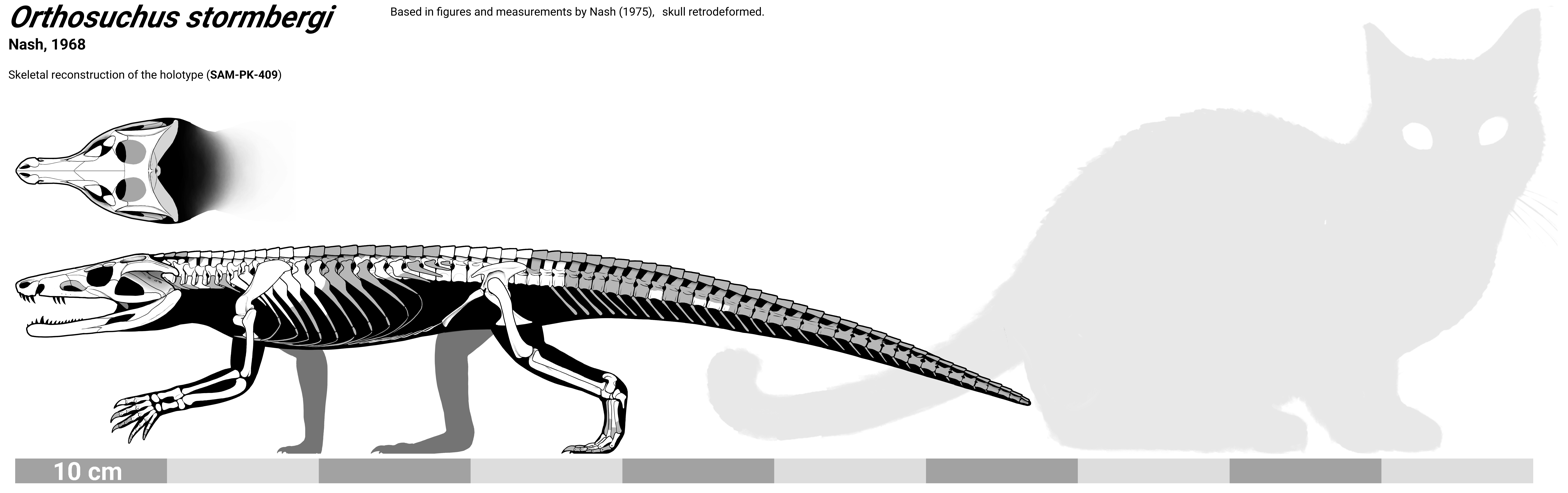
- Skeletal reconstruction of the holotype

Scientific classification
- Kingdom: Animalia
- Phylum: Chordata
- Class: Reptilia
- Clade: Pseudosuchia
- Clade: Crocodylomorpha
- Family: †Protosuchidae
- Genus: †Orthosuchus; Nash, 1968

Species
- O. stormbergi Nash, 1968 (type)

= Orthosuchus =

Orthosuchus Temporal range: Hettangian-Sinemurian 200–194 Ma

Extinct genus of reptiles from the early Jurassic of southern Africa

Orthosuchus (meaning "straight crocodile") is an extinct genus of crocodyliform that lived during the Early Jurassic, about 196 million years ago. It was first discovered in 1963 in the Red Beds Formation in the Qacha's Nek Province of Lesotho, southern Africa. The characteristics shown on its postcranial skeleton and the skull indicated that it is a crocodyliform. The finding is significant since some of the characteristics found on this specimen were believed to be absent until the Jurassic.

== Description ==
Orthosuchus has a body proportion similar to lizards, with a body length about 60–70 centimetres (2.0–2.3 ft), and a wide, flattened skull similar to a crocodilian.

The external skull surface is covered randomly with small pits. The orbits are huge, with a complete dorsal roof made by the paired supraorbitals. The maxilla has sharp edge, which extends forward and covers some part of the lateral notch. The ears are protected by earflaps, which prevent water inflow to the otic recess when this animal is in water. The fossil resembles some features of a primitive crocodilian, one of them is the reduced antorbital fenestra. The quadratojugal is the backbone of the skull, which connects to the jugal and quadrate. The flattened head shape of Orthosuchus is made by the posterior quadrate contact, which is below the rear end of the squamosal. This form is a typical archosaurian characteristic that had lost in modern crocodiles, and also absent in teleosaurs. It developed a short secondary bony palate, with crocodilian featuring pterygoids. The elongated choana is located behind the secondary palate, which is made by the premaxilla and maxilla. In modern crocodiles, the choana is between the vomers and the anterior processes of pterygoids. The dentary forms the largest part of the lower jaw with some shallow pits, which indicated that the animal probably has 15-18 teeth, fewer teeth in the far back. The teeth are equal in size and similar in shape.

Orthosuchus has 24 vertebrae, and 8 of them are believed to be in the cervical region. All vertebrae appear to be amphicoelous. It does not have a tall neural spine and vertebral height decreases from head to tail. The vertebrae in the neck region are tightly bonded together. The ribs start at the twelfth vertebra, which supports the ilium. The tail consists of 8 vertebrae of different size and shape. The first one is in contact with the sacral ribs, three vertebrae at the far end of the tail are tiny in size, and the other four vertebrae form the middle of the tail. The ribs form antero-ventral and postero-dorsal flanges, which are for the muscle attachments.

Orthosuchus has similar pectoral girdles and pelvic girdles compare to living crocodiles, with a long scapula and a shorter coracoid. The interclavicle is hypothesized to be cartilaginous. As for the forelimb, the fossil records showed that Orthosuchus has similar humerus, but the distal and proximal expansions does not lay on the same plane as the modern crocodiles. Also, not like the living crocodiles, the ulna and radius of Orthosuchus, or other typical archosaurs, are around 88% of the length of the humerus, while the radius and ulna in modern crocodiles are the shortest elements in the forelimb. It has two non-elongated carpals, with one of the elliptical shape. Orthosuchus appeared to have 5 digits. The first digit is the shortest and the fifth digit is the weakest. Although some of the phalanges are missing, it is believed that the phalanges formula is 2, 3, 4, 5, 3, 3. The femur is thought to be the longest bone. The tibia is more developed than the fibula, and they are 94% of the length of the femur. Taking all the bones into account, the forelimb is 91% the length of the hind limb. Orthosuchus has similar astragalus and calcaneum. Compared to the astragalus, the rectangular shaped calcaneum is small in size and forms a prominent tuber.

== Discovery ==
The first fossil materials were collected by an expedition of South African Museum in April 1963 led by Alfred W. Crompton. The materials were collected from the Lower Jurassic Red Bed Formation (= Upper Elliot Formation) of the Stormberg, so that as soon as they found out that the fossils belong to a new crocodilian species, they named the species Orthosuchus Stormbergi in a paper published by Nash 1968. They also found a smaller skull that also belongs to Orthosuchus Stormbergi at the same horizon but in a different place at the same site. The main part of the skull and the law jaw was well preserved, but some of the phalanges, ribs, and one side of the pelvic girdle with its hind limb were missing. Since the specimens had some distortions, major issues were fix at the site before it was X-rayed.

In 1931, a new primitive form of crocodilian was found in the Dinosaur Canyon Beds of northern Arizona, United States. The beds are at the top of the Upper Triassic Formation and below the Lower Jurassic sediments. The crocodilian found is about 1 meter long, with flattened head and large frontals. Its more advanced transverse process indicates that it is a new crocodilian species. In 1933 Barnum Brown named it Archaeosuchus, and then changed it to Protosuchus in 1934 and form the family of Protosuchidae. The classification of Protosuchidae is debatable, however, since Orthosuchus resemble some of the characteristics of Protosuchidae, it is believed to be in the part of this family.

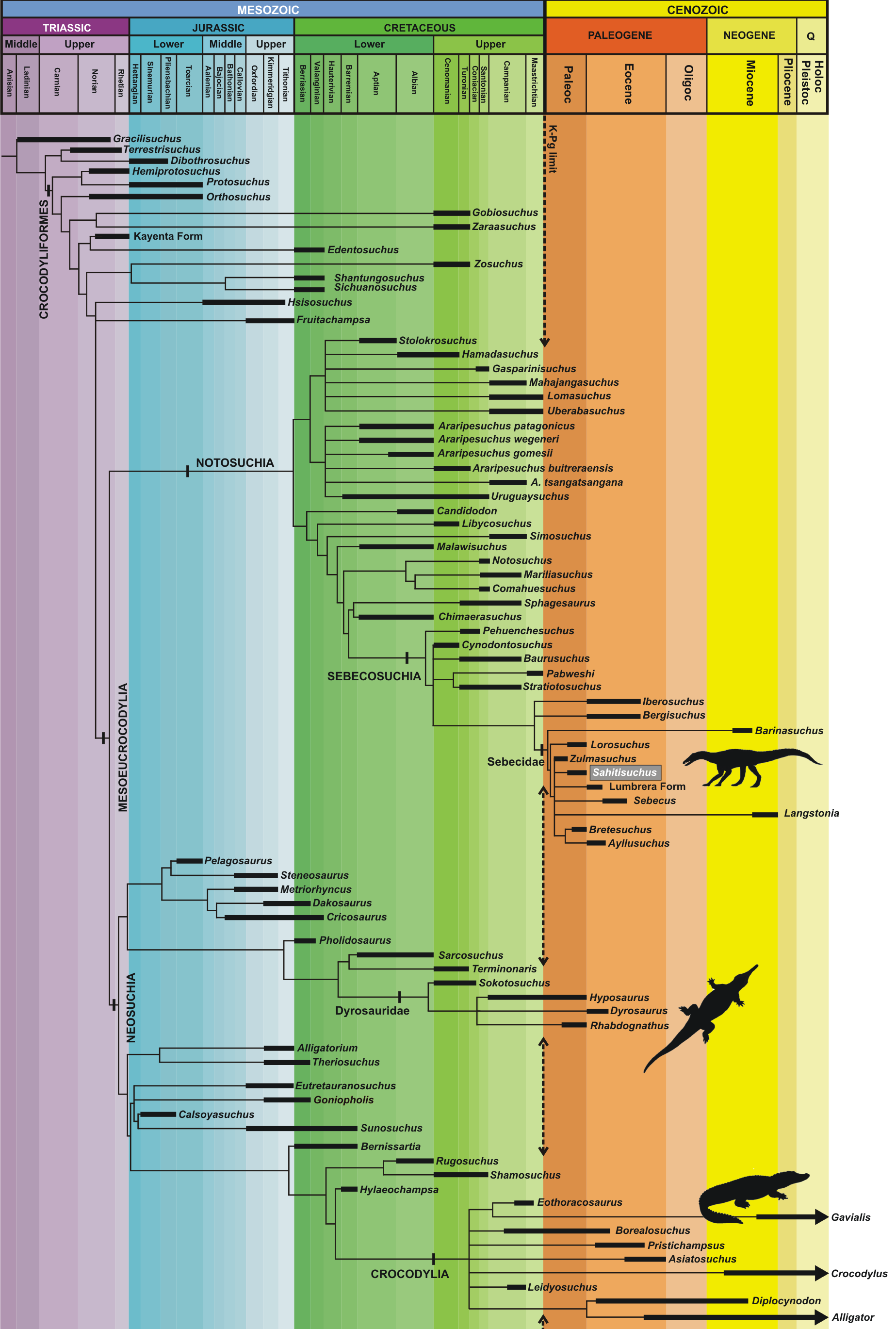
Phylogeny of Crocodylomorpha

== Classification ==
Modern crocodiles are considered within the group archosaurs, which also include birds, dinosaurs, and crocodilians. However, from appearance, archosaurs resemble more of crocodiles than of birds. Orthosuchus resembles a primitive form of crocodilian by some of its traits: the fusion midline together at the parietal, the form of the secondary palate, the fusion of pterygoid and quadrate, the extension of coracoid, radius, and ulna, and the form of tuber on the calcaneum. Orthosuchus is closely related to Protosuchus, Notochampsa, Erythrochampsa, and probably other crocodilian families. Although Orthosuchus could be grouped into Notochampsa, more people want to keep the family Protosuchidae because it is widely accepted. A revision of Notochampsa in 2021 found it valid taxon, and phylogenetic analysis recovered it as sister to Orthosuchus, in a monophyletic Notochampsidae.

== Paleobiology ==
The existing specimens of Orthosuchus were found in the Lower Jurassic Elliot Formation (previously the Red Bed Formation) in South Africa in 1963. It was hypothesized that Orthosuchus lived mainly on terrestrial land, but some key factors contribute to the fact that it spent at least some time in water. The first notable evidence is on the palate, which was covered by soft tissue, not bone. The choanae are on the back of the palate and a valve was used to help close the glottis. These features help Orthosuchus keep breathing when submerging in the aquatic system. The ears are protected by earflaps, which prevent water inflow to the otic recess when this animal is in water. Modern crocodiles also have earflaps to decrease water entry. The shape of the skull, especially the snout, is similar to an Indian gharial, Gavialis gangeticus, who prey on small fish. It is possible that Orthosuchus has the same predation, by slowly moving toward schools of small fish and swallow from the side. The aquatic environment provides plenty of food for the animal, besides small fish, the animal could also feed on lake invertebrates. Orthosuchus has a small salt-secreting gland, which indicates that it is not a marine animal. And because the pubis articulates with the front region of the ischium, it is believed to be a basal animal that lived in swamps and lakes. The animal is probably quadrupedal because the fore limbs are approximately 91% the length of the hind limb, which also makes the walking on land easier. Unlike modern crocodiles, Orthosuchus does not creep on its belly; it probably walks at a high position with its femur vertical to the ground. According to Parrish, primitive crocodylomorphs did not have a crawling stance because it was more used to the terrestrial environment. However, Orthosuchus may not be a good swimmer, since it has amphicoelous vertebrae, whereas modern crocodiles have procoelous vertebrae, which increase the mobility of the tail.

Orthosuchus grew slowly relative to other archosaurs of the time. The main bone tissue type found Orthosuchus is lamellar, with a few patches of woven and parallel-fibred bone. It took about four to five years to reach adult body size and weighed about 1kg as an adult. It also had compact bone that may have been an adaptation to a semiaquatic lifestyle, or possibly fossorial.
