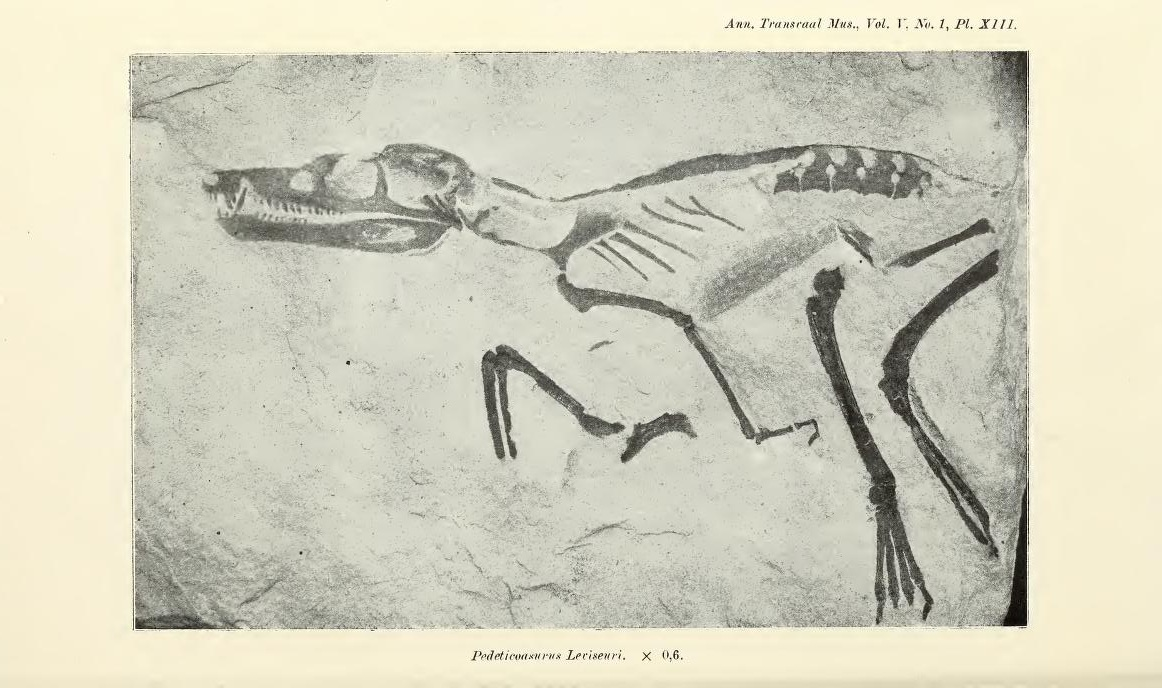
- Holotype
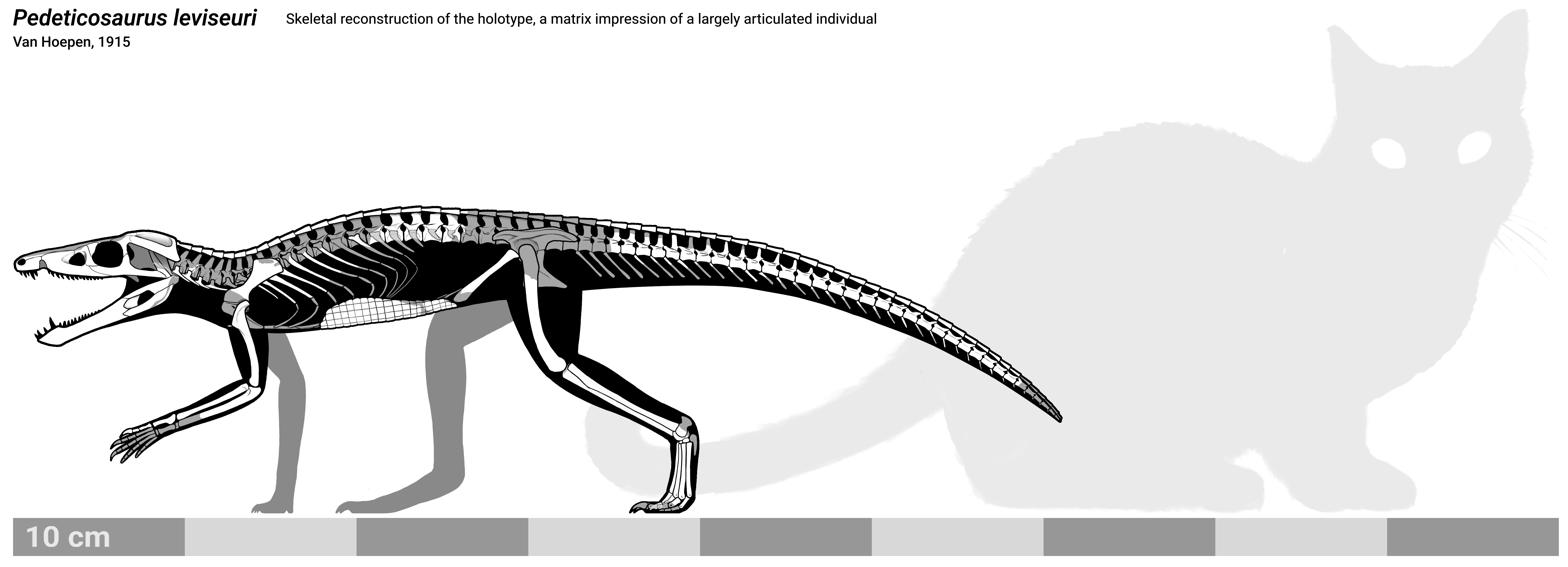
- Skeletal reconstruction

Scientific classification
- Kingdom: Animalia
- Phylum: Chordata
- Class: Reptilia
- Clade: Pseudosuchia
- Clade: Crocodylomorpha
- Clade: Crocodyliformes
- Genus: †Pedeticosaurus; Van Hoepen, 1915

Type species
- †Pedeticosaurus leviseuri Van Hoepen, 1915

Synonyms
- Pedeticossaurus (sic); Pedeticoasurus (lapsus calami)

= Pedeticosaurus =

Pedeticosaurus Temporal range: Early Jurassic, 190–182 Ma

Extinct genus of reptiles

Pedeticosaurus is an extinct genus of crocodylomorph from the Clarens Formation (Early Jurassic) of South Africa. The type species Pedeticosaurus leviseuri was named by Egbert Cornelis Nicolaas van Hoepen in 1915 on the basis of a mold of a mostly complete skeleton found in a quarry near Rosendal, Free State. The mold preserves most of the right half of the skeleton including the skull, ribs, dorsal vertebrae, forelimbs and hindlimbs, tail, and both dermal and ventral osteoderms, separated on two slabs. It is currently housed in the National Museum in Bloemfontein and cataloged as NMQR606.

== Taxonomy ==
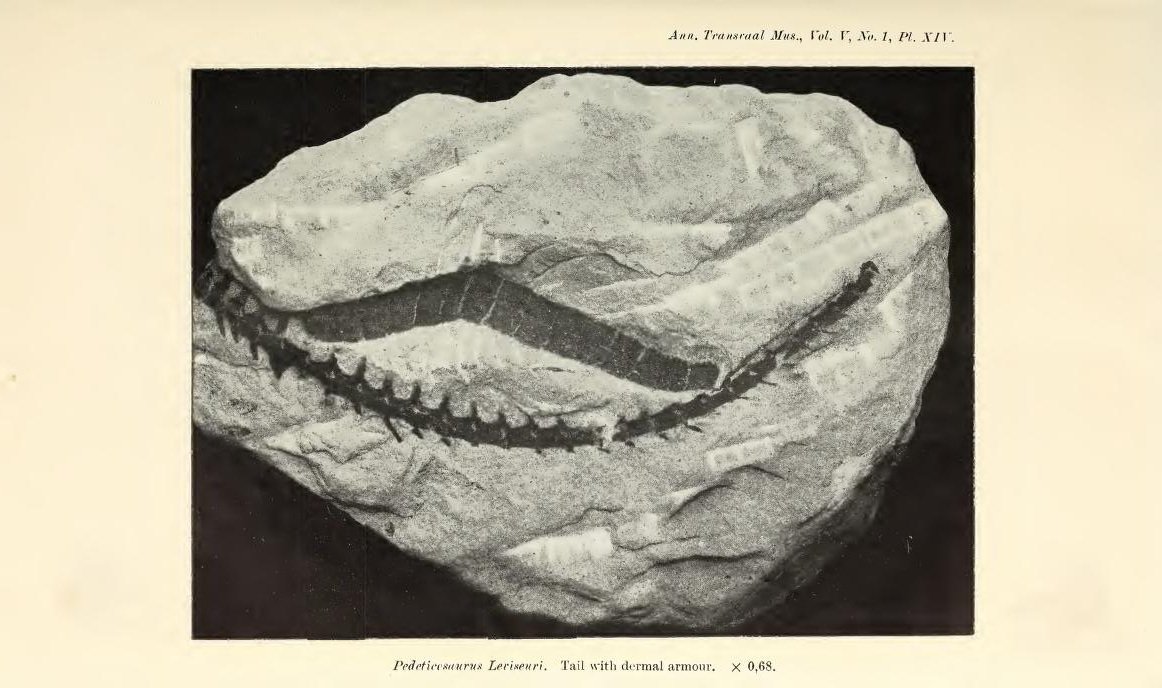
Second holotype slab showing caudal vertebrae and osteoderms

Van Hoepen originally established a new family for Pedeticosaurus called Pedeticosauridae, which he thought was closely related to the family Ornithosuchidae. In later years Pedeticosaurus was interpreted as either a member of Sphenosuchia or Protosuchia, both of which are groups of small-bodied Jurassic crocodylomorphs. Paleontologist A. D. Walker erected a new group called Pedeticosauria in 1968, which he named after Pedeticosaurus and is now considered equivalent to Sphenosuchia. In 1986, James M. Clark proposed that Pedeticosaurus leviseuri was a synonym of the better known protosuchian species Protosuchus haughtoni based on features such as a broad scapula bone with a concave front margin and a large squamosal bone in the skull. In 2002, Clark and Hans-Dieter Sues proposed that Pedeticosaurus leviseuri was a nomen dubium or "doubtful name" given that the features in QS 606 are too poorly preserved to distinguish P. leviseuri as its own species.

Paleontologists C. E. Gow and James Kitching of the Bernard Price Institute for Palaeontological Research referred a second skeleton to Pedeticosaurus in 1988. This skeleton was found just below the Clarens Formation in the slightly older Elliot Formation. It is housed in the Bernard Price Institute and cataloged as BP/1/5237. Gow and Kitching classified it as Pedeticosaurus sp. and considered it a sphenosuchian. In 2002, Clark and Sues assigned BP/1/5237 to a new genus and species of sphenosuchian named Litargosuchus leptorhynchus.
