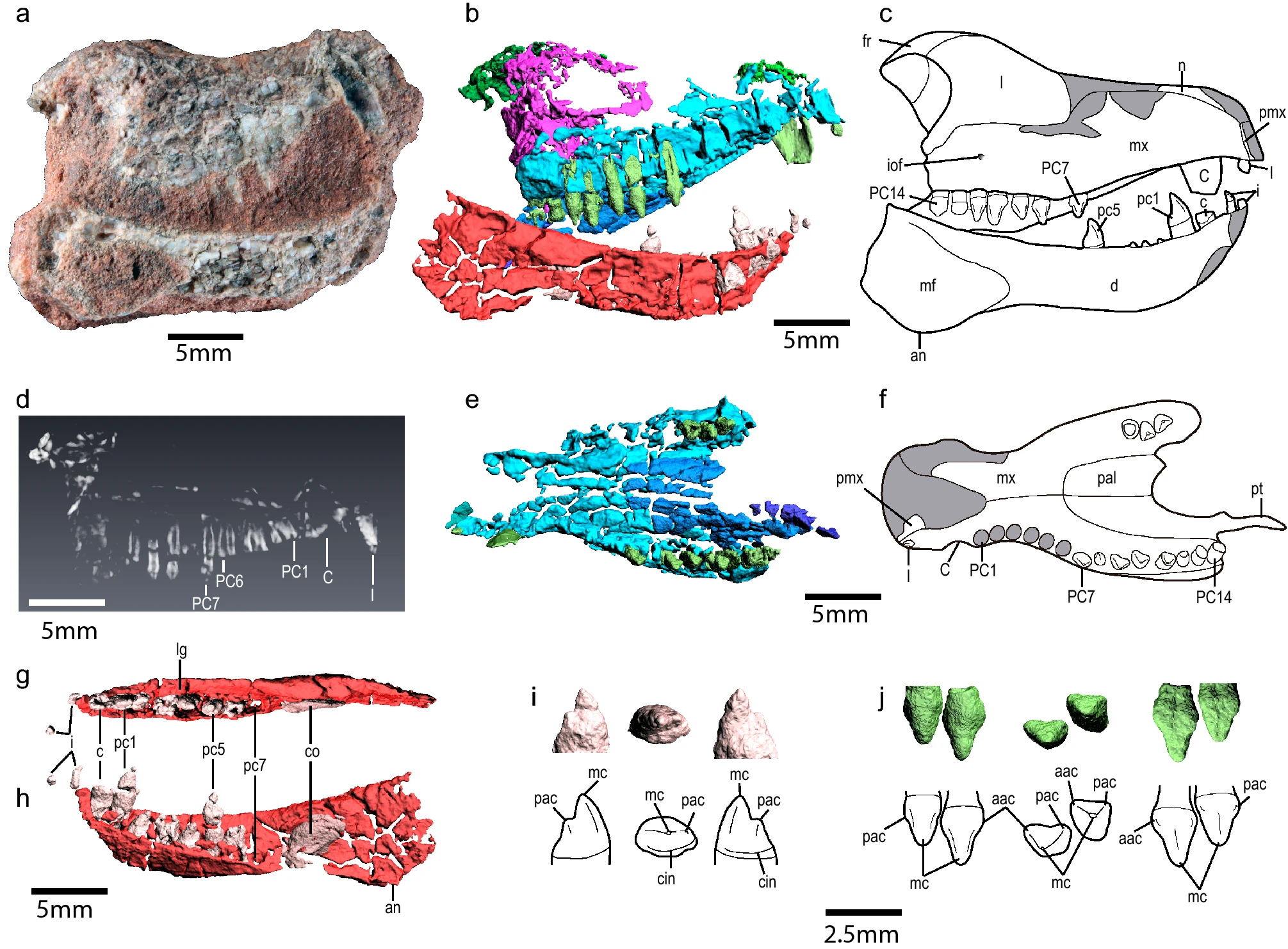
- Holotype cranium of Tessellatia in various views and interpretations

Scientific classification
- Domain: Eukaryota
- Kingdom: Animalia
- Phylum: Chordata
- Clade: Synapsida
- Clade: Therapsida
- Clade: Cynodontia
- Clade: Probainognathia
- Genus: †Tessellatia; Gaetano et al., 2022
- Species: †T. bonapartei

Binomial name
- †Tessellatia bonapartei Gaetano et al., 2022

= Tessellatia =

Tessellatia Temporal range: Late Triassic (mid-Norian), 220–211 Ma

Extinct genus of cynodonts

Tessellatia is an extinct genus of probainognathian cynodont from the Late Triassic Los Colorados Formation of La Rioja, Argentina. The genus contains a single species, T. bonapartei, known from a partial skull.

== Discovery and naming ==
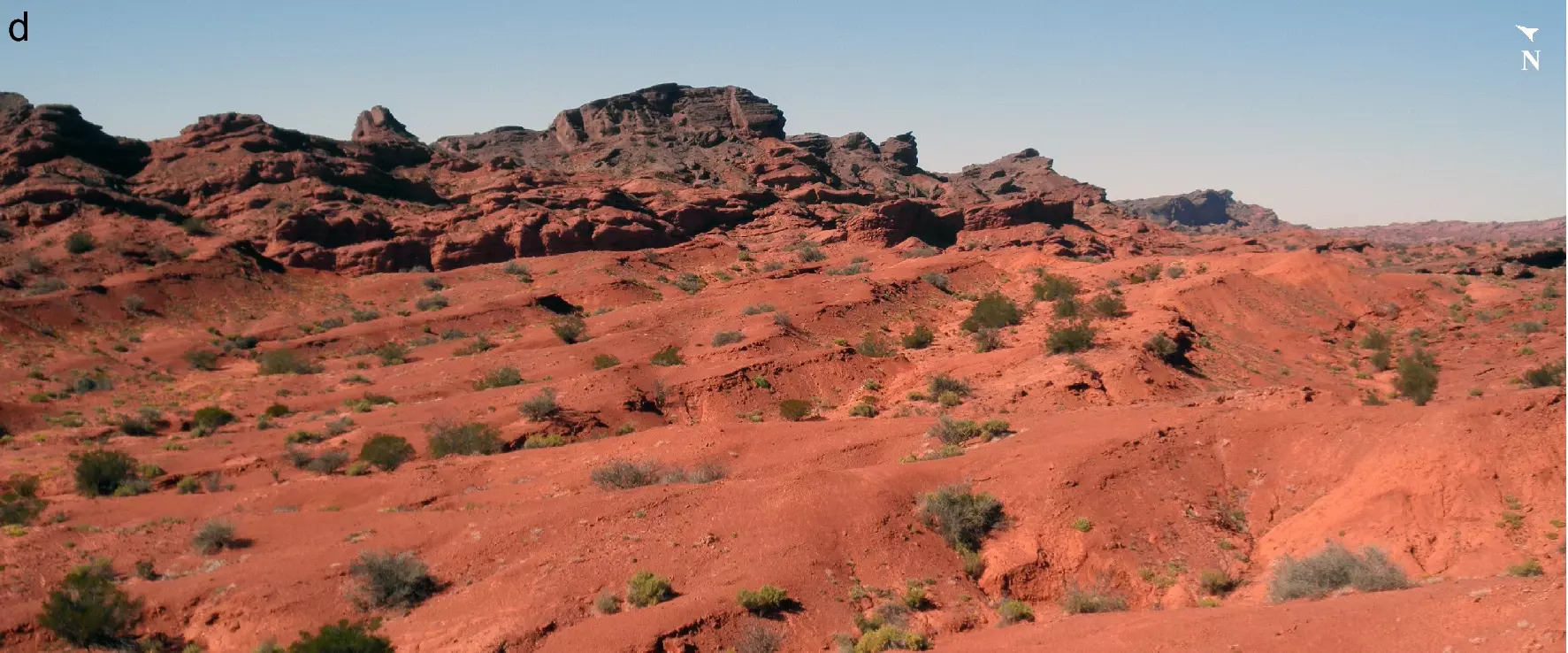
Layers of the 'La Esquina' locality of the Los Colorados Formation where the holotype was discovered

The Tessellatia holotype specimen, PULR-V121, was discovered in upper layers of the Los Colorados Formation in Talampaya National Park in La Rioja Province, Argentina. The specimen consists of a partial skull, including the snout and orbital region, and lower jaws.

In 2022, Gaetano et al. described Tessellatia as a new genus and species of probainognathian cynodont. The generic name, "Tessellatia", is derived from the Latin "tessella" (the individual tiles making up a mosaic), in reference to a conglomerate of basal and derived features seen in the taxon. The specific name, "bonapartei", honors the Argentine paleontologist José F. Bonaparte, who described the first cynodont fossils from the Los Colorados Formation.
