= Entradasuchus =

Entradasuchus Temporal range: Middle Jurassic

Scientific classification
- Domain: Eukaryota
- Kingdom: Animalia
- Phylum: Chordata
- Class: Reptilia
- Clade: Archosauria
- Clade: Pseudosuchia
- Clade: Crocodylomorpha
- Clade: Crocodyliformes
- Genus: †Entradasuchus; Hunt & Lockley, 1995
- Species: †E. spinosus

Binomial name
- †Entradasuchus spinosus Hunt & Lockley, 1995

Genus of reptiles

Entradasuchus (meaning "Entrada [Sandstone and Ranch] crocodile") is a genus of crocodyliform, an early member of the group including crocodilians. The only known specimen was found in rocks of the Middle Jurassic Entrada Sandstone of Entrada Ranch, Grand County, Utah. Middle Jurassic terrestrial tetrapods are very rare, and Entradasuchus was the first unequivocal North American Middle Jurassic nonmarine tetrapod known from body fossils when it was described (1995).

== Description ==
Entradasuchus is based on CU-MWC 183-11, a skeleton including at least the upper surfaces of the skull, articulated armor scutes from the neck to the tail, and some limb bones, all preserved in top (dorsal) view. The exact composition of the specimen was unknown at the time of its description, because it is preserved in sandstone that is harder than the calcite that has replaced the bones, which makes preparation difficult. Additionally, much of the visible part of the skeleton is represented by mold impressions of eroded bones. The block containing the specimen weathered from canyon walls and probably came from the middle Moab Member of the Entrada Sandstone, dated to the very late middle Callovian of the Middle Jurassic. The Moab Member of the Entrada Sandstone represents an inland dune (eolian) setting.

The skull of CU-MWC 183-11 is distinguished by the width of the posterior portion. Approximately 42 pairs of scutes ran down the midline of the back. The first pair behind the skull were square, but those on the back and tail were rectangular and had short spiny projections on their posterior outside corners. These spines inspired the name of the type species: E. spinosus. CU-MWC 183-11 was not a large animal, with a skull only a few centimeters or inches long. This small size and the form of the skull could indicate it was a juvenile, but the fusion of the parietals in the skull and the generally small size of animals found in settings like the upper Entrada Sandstone suggest it was an adult. Adrian Hunt and Martin Lockley, who described Entradasuchus in 1995, classified it as Crocodyliformes incertae sedis.

The type specimen is curated at the Museum of Western Colorado in Fruita, Colorado.
