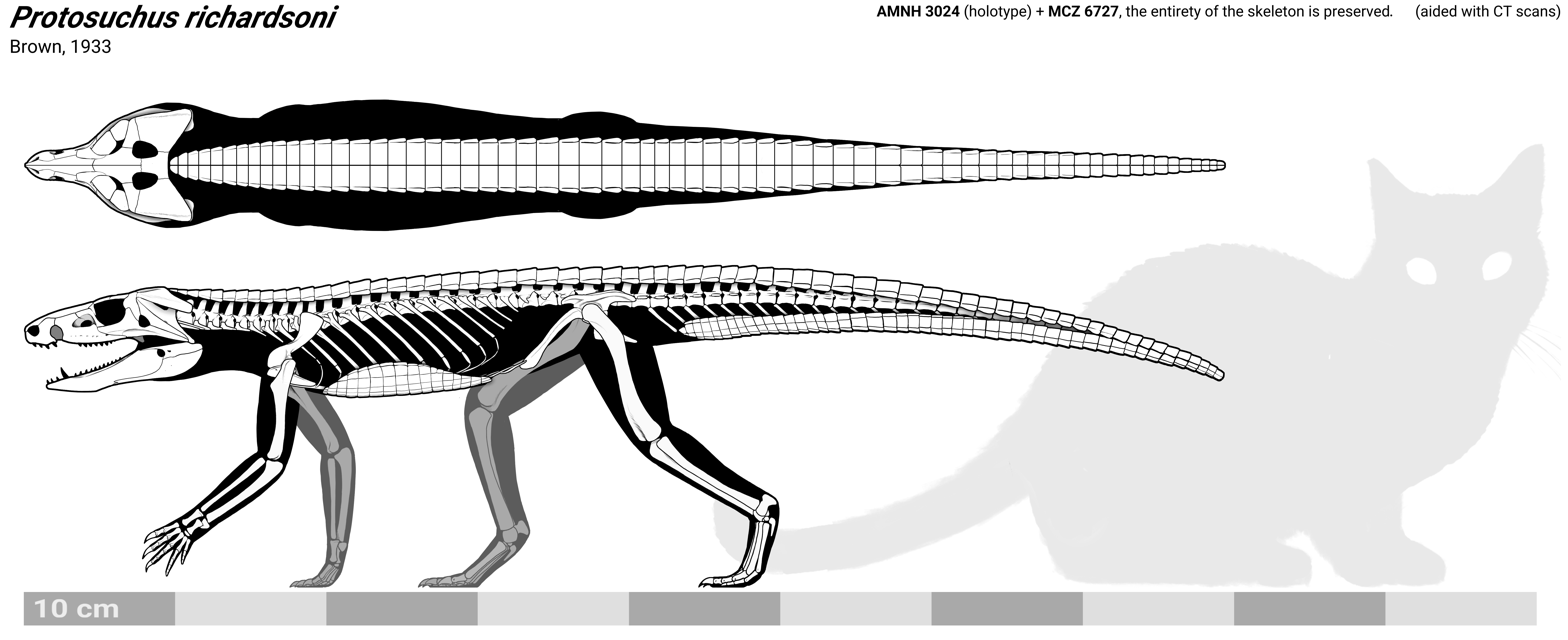
- Skeletal reconstruction of Protosuchus

Scientific classification
- Kingdom: Animalia
- Phylum: Chordata
- Class: Reptilia
- Clade: Pseudosuchia
- Clade: Crocodylomorpha
- Clade: Crocodyliformes
- Family: †Protosuchidae; Brown, 1934

Genera
- †Coloradisuchus; †Dianosuchus; †Edentosuchus; †Erythrochampsa; †Hemiprotosuchus; †Hoplosuchus; †Notochampsa; †Orthosuchus; †Protosuchus; †Stegomosuchus?

= Protosuchidae =

Protosuchids Temporal range: Late Triassic - Early Cretaceous Norian–Albian

Extinct family of reptiles

Protosuchidae is a family of basal crocodyliform reptiles that lived from the Late Triassic to the Late Cretaceous. This family should not be confused with Protosuchia, which is an informal evolutionary grade of primitive crocodyliforms

== Distribution ==
Triassic protosuchids are known from Lesotho, Argentina, and Arizona. Jurassic protosuchids are known from Nova Scotia, Poland, South Africa, and Arizona.Cretaceous protosuchids are known from China.

== Phylogeny ==
Below is a phylogeny of protosuchids modified from Bronzati et al. (2012).

- - Protosuchidae
    - Orthosuchus stormbergi
    - - - Protosuchus richardsoni
        - Hemiprotosuchus leali
      - - Kayenta Form
        - Edentosuchus tienshanensis
