= Edentosuchus =

Edentosuchus Temporal range: Early Cretaceous

Scientific classification
- Kingdom: Animalia
- Phylum: Chordata
- Class: Reptilia
- Clade: Archosauria
- Clade: Pseudosuchia
- Clade: Crocodylomorpha
- Family: †Protosuchidae
- Genus: †Edentosuchus; Yang, 1973

Type species
- †Edentosuchus tienshanensis Yang, 1973

Extinct genus of reptiles

Edentosuchus is a genus of protosuchian crocodyliform. It is known from fossils found in rocks of the Early Cretaceous-age Tugulu Group from the Junggar Basin, Xinjiang, China. Two partial skulls and several neck vertebrae are known to date. An articulated partial postcranial skeleton may also belong to this genus, but there is no overlapping material between it and known Edentosuchus specimens.

== History ==
Edentosuchus was described in 1973 by Yang Zhongjian (C. C. Young), and is based on IVPP V 3236, a partial skull and associated neck vertebrae. The type species is E. tienshanensis. A joint Natural History Museum of Los Angeles County-National Geological Museum of China expedition recovered another partial skull in 2000. Yang originally assigned it to its own family (Edentosuchidae) within Protosuchia, but later research by Diego Pol and colleagues using the new material found it to be a protosuchid.

== Description ==
Edentosuchus had markedly heterodont teeth. In the upper jaw, the teeth in the tip of the snout (premaxillae) were conical. Following them, the first two teeth of the maxillae had three cusps. The next two had numerous small cusps, and the fifth and last was bulbous, larger than others, and featured small cusps. In the lower jaw, several of the nine teeth on each side featured small cusps, but the second tooth was a greatly enlarged fang. The skull was only a few centimetres (or inches) long, and had a short, relatively narrow snout and wide posterior section.

== Paleoecology ==
Edentosuchus lived in a hot, seasonally arid floodplain environment. Living alongside it were turtles, dsungaripterid pterosaurs, and theropod, sauropod, stegosaurian, psittacosaurid, and ornithopod dinosaurs.
