= Hemiprotosuchus =

Hemiprotosuchus Temporal range: Norian ~221.5–205.6 Ma

Scientific classification
- Domain: Eukaryota
- Kingdom: Animalia
- Phylum: Chordata
- Class: Reptilia
- Clade: Archosauria
- Clade: Pseudosuchia
- Clade: Crocodylomorpha
- Clade: Crocodyliformes
- Family: †Protosuchidae
- Genus: †Hemiprotosuchus; Bonaparte 1969

Type species
- †Hemiprotosuchus leali Bonaparte, 1969

Extinct genus of reptiles

Hemiprotosuchus is an extinct genus of protosuchid crocodyliform from the Late Triassic (Norian stage) Los Colorados Formation of the Ischigualasto-Villa Unión Basin in northwestern Argentina, South America. It was named in 1969 by paleontologist José Bonaparte . The type species is H. leali.

== History ==
Hemiprotosuchus was named by Argentinian paleontologist José Bonaparte in 1969. The type species is H. leali. The fossils included a skull and jaws as well as some postcranial elements.

A 2009 cladistic analysis of protosuchids by paleontologist Eric Buffetaut et al. found that Hemiprotosuchus was the sister taxon of Protosuchus.
