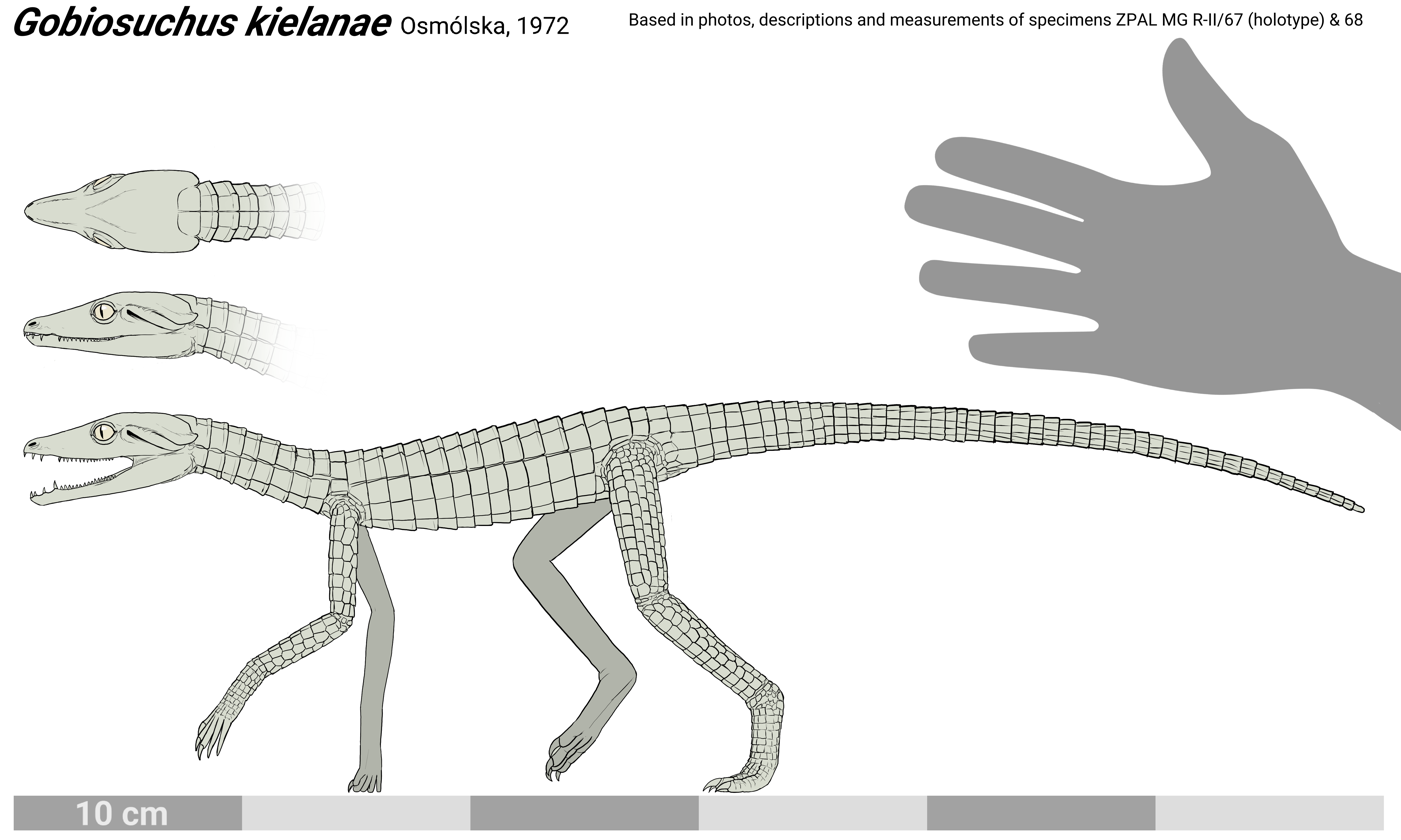
- Gobiosuchus, a small gobiosuchid crocodyliform
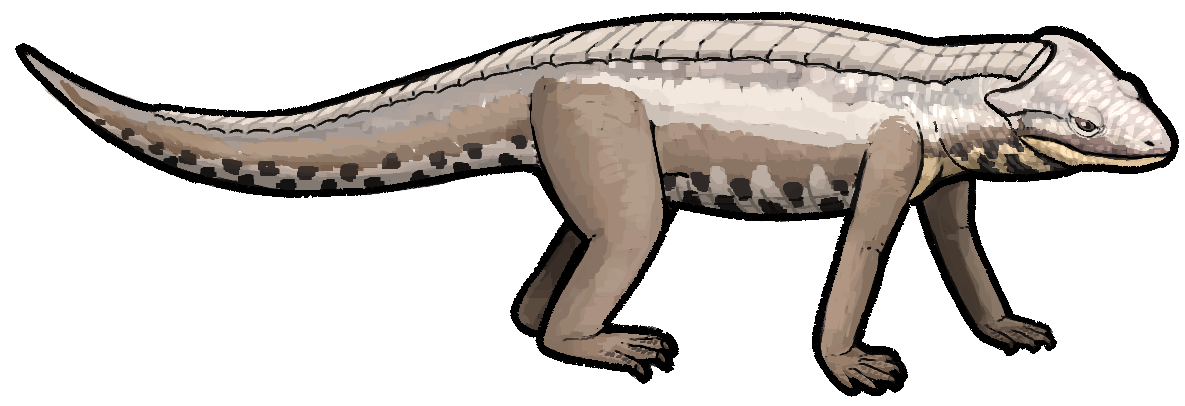
- Life restoration of Stegomosuchus ("Protosuchia")

Scientific classification
- Kingdom: Animalia
- Phylum: Chordata
- Class: Reptilia
- Clade: Pseudosuchia
- Clade: Crocodylomorpha
- Clade: Solidocrania
- Clade: Crocodyliformes; Hay, 1930

Clades
- †Eopneumatosuchus
- †Notochampsa
- †Orthosuchus
- †Pedeticosaurus
- †Stegomosuchus
- †Protosuchidae
- †Thalattosuchia?
- Gobiosuchoidea
  - †Platyognathus
  - †Gobiosuchidae
- Mesoeucrocodylia
Crocodyliformes incertae sedis
- †Entradasuchus
- †Kemkemia
- †Microchampsa?
- †Tagarosuchus

= Crocodyliformes =

Crocodyliformes Temporal range: Late Triassic–Recent, 225–0 Ma

Clade of reptiles

Crocodyliformes is a clade of crurotarsan archosaurs, the group often traditionally referred to as "crocodilians". They are the first members of Crocodylomorpha to possess many of the features that define later relatives. They are the only pseudosuchians to survive the Cretaceous–Paleogene extinction event.

In 1988, James M. Clark argued that traditional names for well-known groups of animals should be restricted to their crown clades, that is, used only for natural groups comprising all living members of any given lineage and descendants of their closest common ancestor. This posed a problem for the crocodilians, because the name Crocodylia, while used in various ways by various scientists, had always included not only living crocodilians but many of their extinct ancestors known only from the fossil record.

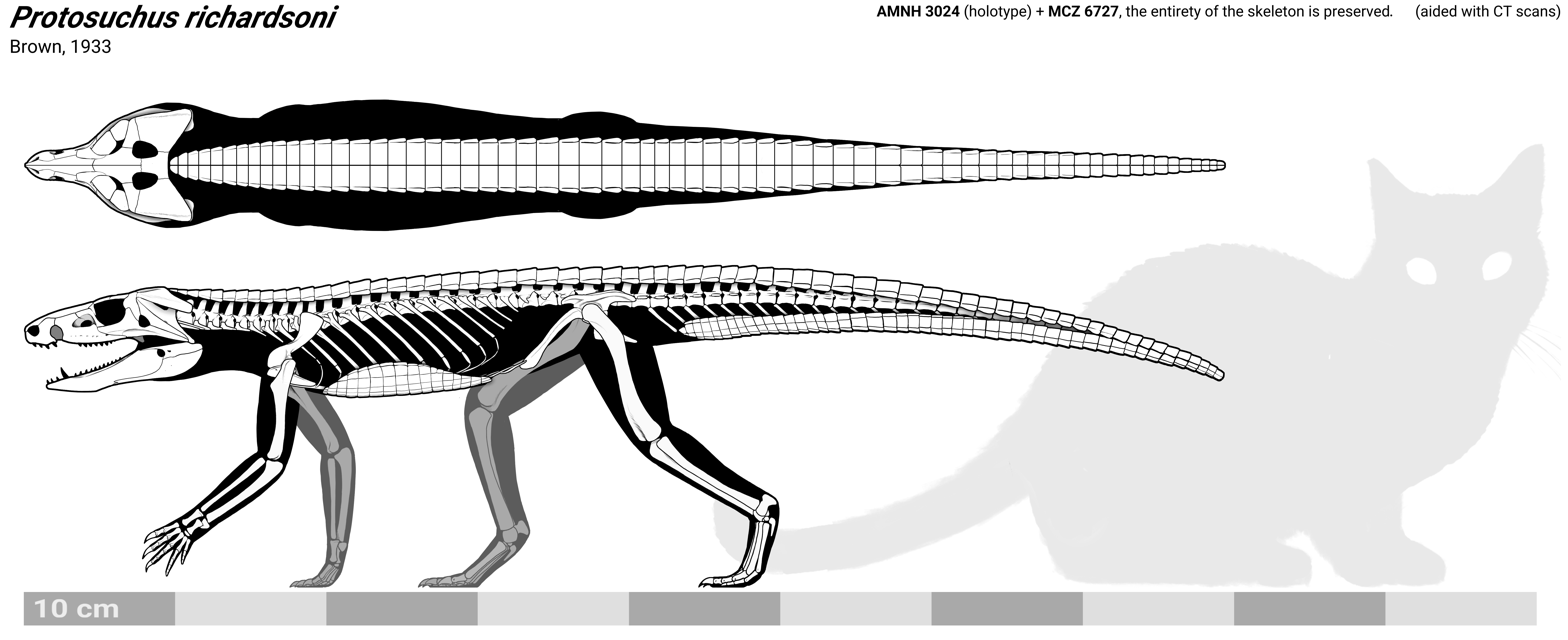
Skeletal reconstruction of Protosuchus richardsoni, a defining taxon of crocodyliformes

Clark's solution to this issue was to restrict the name Crocodylia to the group containing modern alligators, crocodiles, and gharials, plus any extinct taxa descended from their closest common ancestor. The traditional group "Crocodylia" was replaced by the name Crocodyliformes, defined to include many of the extinct families that the new definition left out. Clark did not initially provide an exact definition for Crocodyliformes; but, in 2001, Paul Sereno and colleagues defined it as the clade including Protosuchus richardsoni and the Nile crocodile, plus all descendants of their common ancestor.

Christopher Brochu agreed with the assessment that Crocodylia as a name has never had stable contents, and that a series of clades larger than the crown group Crocodylia (including Crocodyliformes and the slightly more inclusive clade Crocodylomorpha) was a good solution. However, in a 2008 paper, Jeremy Martin and Benton reversed the previous opinion (co-authored by Benton) that Crocodylia should be restricted to the crown group, suggesting that Crocodyliformes should be considered a synonym of a more inclusive Crocodylia, and thus replaced. Brochu and colleagues rejected this proposal, arguing that the crown definition of Crocodylia is the standard meaning both within and beyond the crocodyliform systematics community.

== Ecology ==
While all extant crocodilians are carnivorous, the ecological roles of Mesozoic crocodyliforms were more diverse, and included omnivory and herbivory. Herbivorous forms were present from the early Jurassic to the late Cretaceous and are thought to have evolved at least three times.

== Fossil tracks ==
Tracks of a crocodyliform are known since Cretaceous, at least. Tracks representing the ichnofamily Batrachopodidae are described from the Early Cretaceous (late Aptian) Calonda Formation (Angola) by Mateus et al. (2017), who name a new ichnotaxon Angolaichnus adamanticus.

== Phylogeny ==
Below is a simplified cladogram based on Fiorelli and Calvo (2007).

- Crocodylomorpha
  - - Terrestrisuchus
    - Dibothrosuchus
  - Crocodyliformes
    - "Protosuchia"
      - Gobiosuchidae
        - Gobiosuchus
        - Zaraasuchus
      - Protosuchidae
        - Orthosuchus
        - - - Protosuchus
            - Hemiprotosuchus
          - - Kayenta Form
            - Edentosuchus
    - Mesoeucrocodylia

In 2012, paleontologists Mario Bronzati, Felipe Chinaglia Montefeltro, and Max C. Langer conducted a broad phylogenetic analysis to produce supertrees of Crocodyliformes, including 184 species. The most parsimonious trees were highly resolved, meaning the phylogenetic relationships found in the analysis were highly likely. Below is a consensus tree based on the study:

- - Kayentasuchus walkeri
  - Crocodyliformes
    - Protosuchidae
      - Orthosuchus stormbergi
      - - - Protosuchus richardsoni
          - Hemiprotosuchus leali
        - - Kayenta Form
          - Edentosuchus tienshanensis
    - - Gobiosuchidae
        - Zaraasuchus shepardi
        - Las Hoyas Croc
        - Gobiosuchus kielanae
      - - Eopneumatosuchus colberti
        - - Zosuchus davidsoni
          - - - Sichuanosuchus shuhanensis
              - Sichuanosuchus huidongensis
            - - Shantungosuchus hangjinensis
              - Shantungosuchus chuhsiensis
              - Shantungosuchus brachycephalus
              - Neuquensuchus universitas
        - - - Shartegosuchus asperopalatum
            - Fruita Form (Fruitachampsa callisoni)
          - - - Hsisosuchus dashanpuensis
              - Hsisosuchus chungkingensis
            - Metasuchia
              - Notosuchia
                - - Araripesuchus wegeneri
                  - - Araripesuchus tsangatsangana
                    - Araripesuchus buitreraensis
                    - - Araripesuchus patagonicus
                      - Araripesuchus gomesii
                - - - Uruguaysuchus terrai
                    - Uruguaysuchus aznarezi
                  - - Libycosuchus brevirostris
                    - - Simosuchus clarki
                      - - - Malawisuchus mwakasyungutiensis
                          - Candidodon itapecuruense
                        - - - Notosuchus terrestris
                            - - Comahuesuchus brachybuccalis
                              - - Mariliasuchus amarali
                                - - Yacarerani boliviensis
                                  - Pakasuchus kapilimai
                                  - Adamantinasuchus navae
                          - - Stratiotosuchus maxhechti
                            - Pehuenchesuchus enderi
                            - Pabwehshi pakistanensis
                            - Iberosuchus macrodon
                            - Eremosuchus elkoholicus
                            - Doratodon
                            - Bergisuchus dietrichbergi
                            - Baurusuchus salgadoensis
                            - Baurusuchus pachechoi
                            - - Chimaerasuchus paradoxus
                              - - Sphagesaurus huenei
                                - Sphagesaurus montealtensis
                            - - - Sebecus huilensis
                                - Sebecus icaeorhinus
                              - - Itaborai Croc
                                - Bretesuchus bonapartei
              - - Anatosuchus minor
                - - - Barcinosuchus gradilis
                    - Itasuchus jesuinoi
                    - - Miadanasuchus oblita
                      - Trematochampsa taqueti
                      - Caririsuchus camposi
                    - - - Kaprosuchus saharicus
                        - Mahajangasuchus insignis
                      - Peirosauridae
                        - Hamadasuchus rebouli
                        - - Montealtosuchus arrudacamposi
                          - Uberabasuchus terrificus
                          - - Peirosaurus torminni
                            - Lomasuchus palpebrosus
                  - Neosuchia
