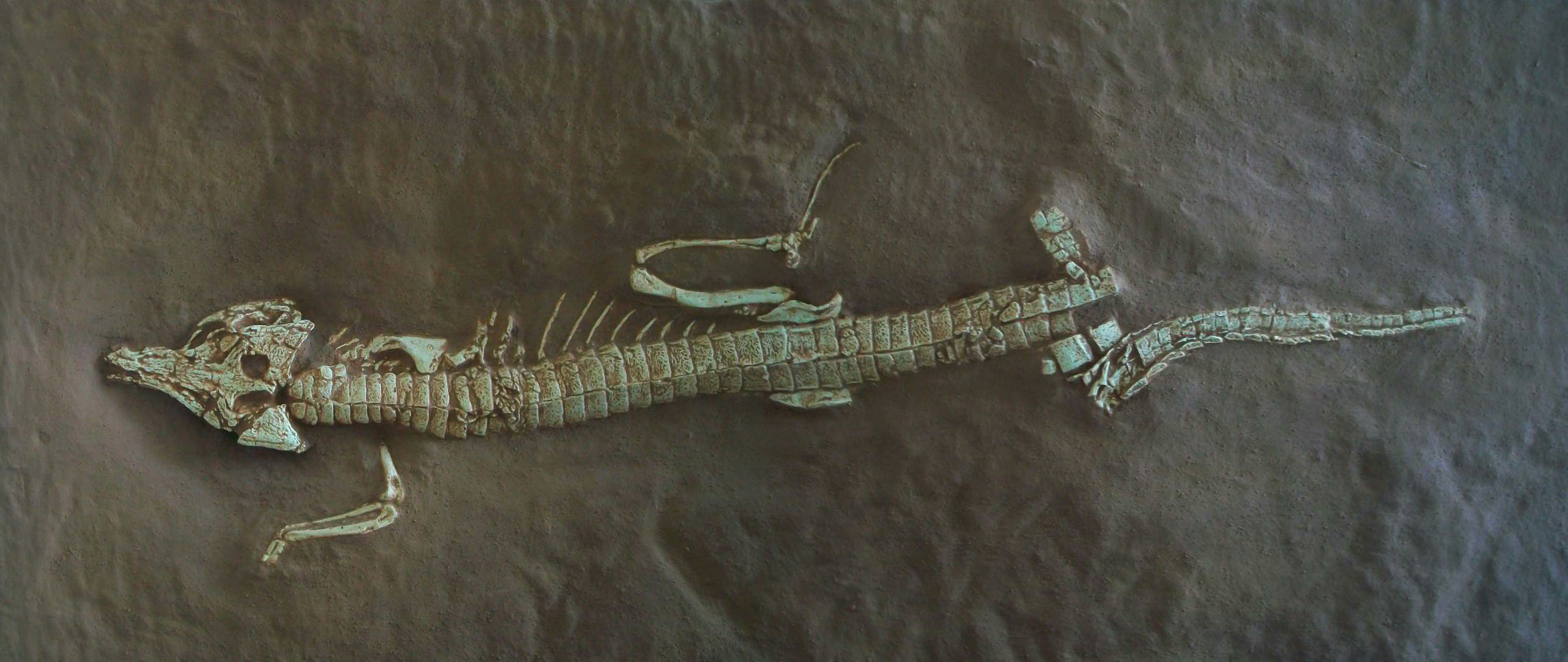
- A skeleton of Protosuchus richardsoni in the American Museum of Natural History
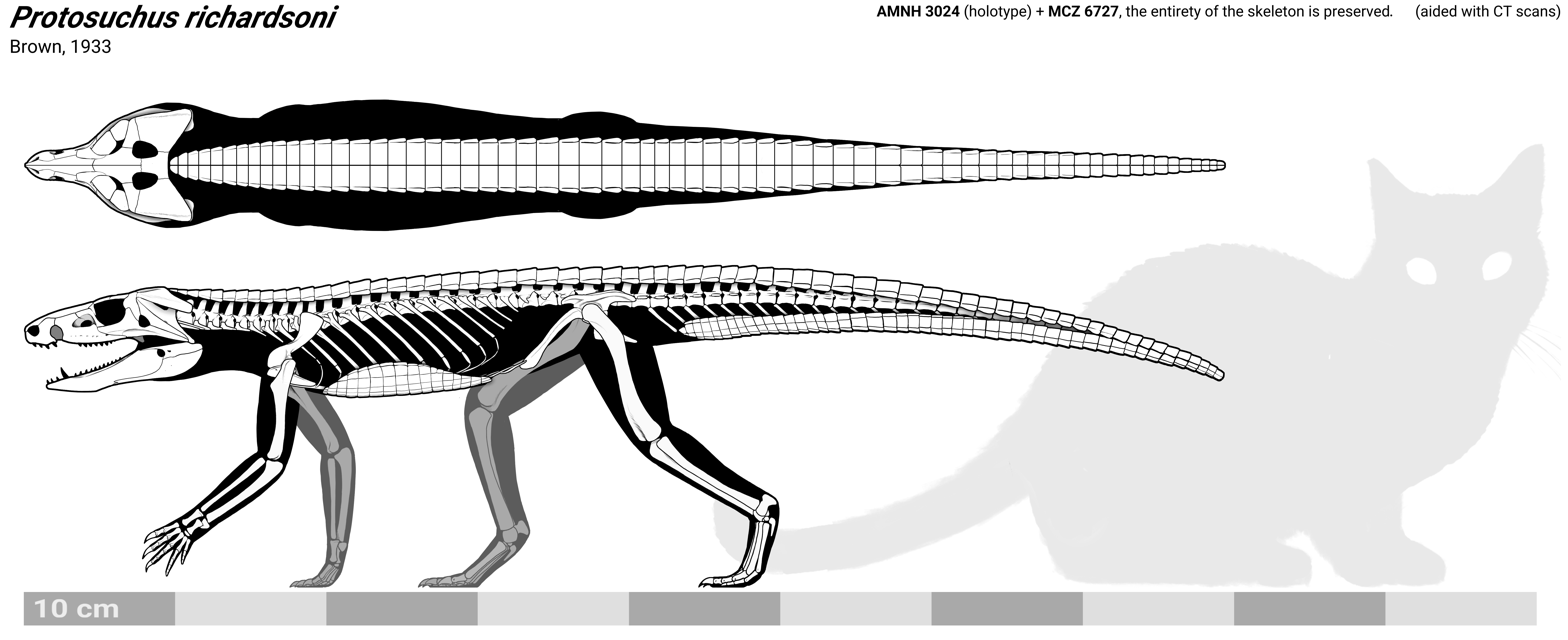
- Skeletal reconstruction of Protosuchus richardsoni

Scientific classification
- Kingdom: Animalia
- Phylum: Chordata
- Class: Reptilia
- Clade: Pseudosuchia
- Clade: Crocodylomorpha
- Clade: Crocodyliformes
- Informal group: †Protosuchia; Mook, 1934

Subgroups
- See text.

= Protosuchia =

Protosuchia Temporal range: Late Triassic - Late Cretaceous

Extinct informal group of reptiles

Protosuchia is a group of extinct Mesozoic crocodyliforms. They were small in size (~1 meter in length) and terrestrial. In phylogenetic terms, Protosuchia is considered an informal group because it is a grade of basal crocodyliforms, not a true clade.

== Classification ==
Recent phylogenetic analyses have not supported Protosuchia as a natural group. However, two studies found a clade of Late Triassic-Early Jurassic animals:

- Edentosuchus
- Hemiprotosuchus
- Orthosuchus
- Protosuchus

Both of these studies also found a clade more closely related to Hsisosuchus and Mesoeucrocodylia consisting of Late Jurassic-Late Cretaceous genera:

- Neuquensuchus
- Shantungosuchus
- Sichuanosuchus
- Zosuchus

However, other possible protosuchians from the Late Cretaceous of China-Mongolia, the Gobiosuchidae (Gobiosuchus and Zaraasuchus), have been found to be either intermediate between these two clades, or members of the Sichuanosuchus clade. There is also another family of Late Jurassic-Late Cretaceous genera, the Shartegosuchidae (e.g. Kyasuchus, Shartegosuchus and Nominosuchus).

Below is a cladogram from Fiorelli and Calvo (2007). Protosuchians are marked by the green bracket.

- Crocodylomorpha
  - - Terrestrisuchus
    - Dibothrosuchus
  - Crocodyliformes
    - - Gobiosuchidae
        - Gobiosuchus
        - Zaraasuchus
      - - Orthosuchus
        - - Protosuchidae
            - Protosuchus
            - Hemiprotosuchus
          - - "Kayenta Form"
            - Edentosuchus
    - Mesoeucrocodylia
      - - "Fruitachampsa"
        - - Zosuchus
          - - Sichuanosuchus
            - - Shantungosuchus
              - Neuquensuchus
      - - Hsisosuchus
        - Metasuchia
          - Neosuchia
          - Peirosauridae
          - Notosuchia
