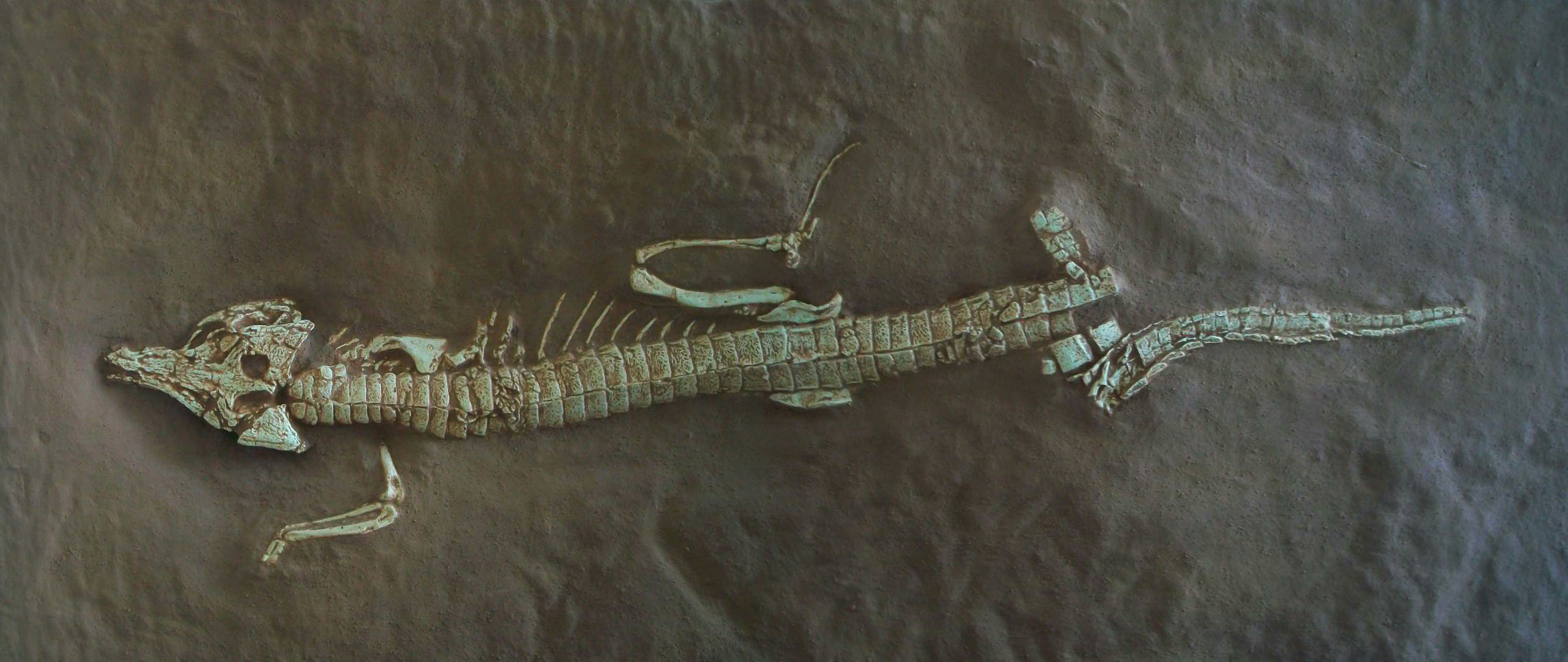
- A cast of Protosuchus richardsoni (AMNH 3024) in the American Museum of Natural History
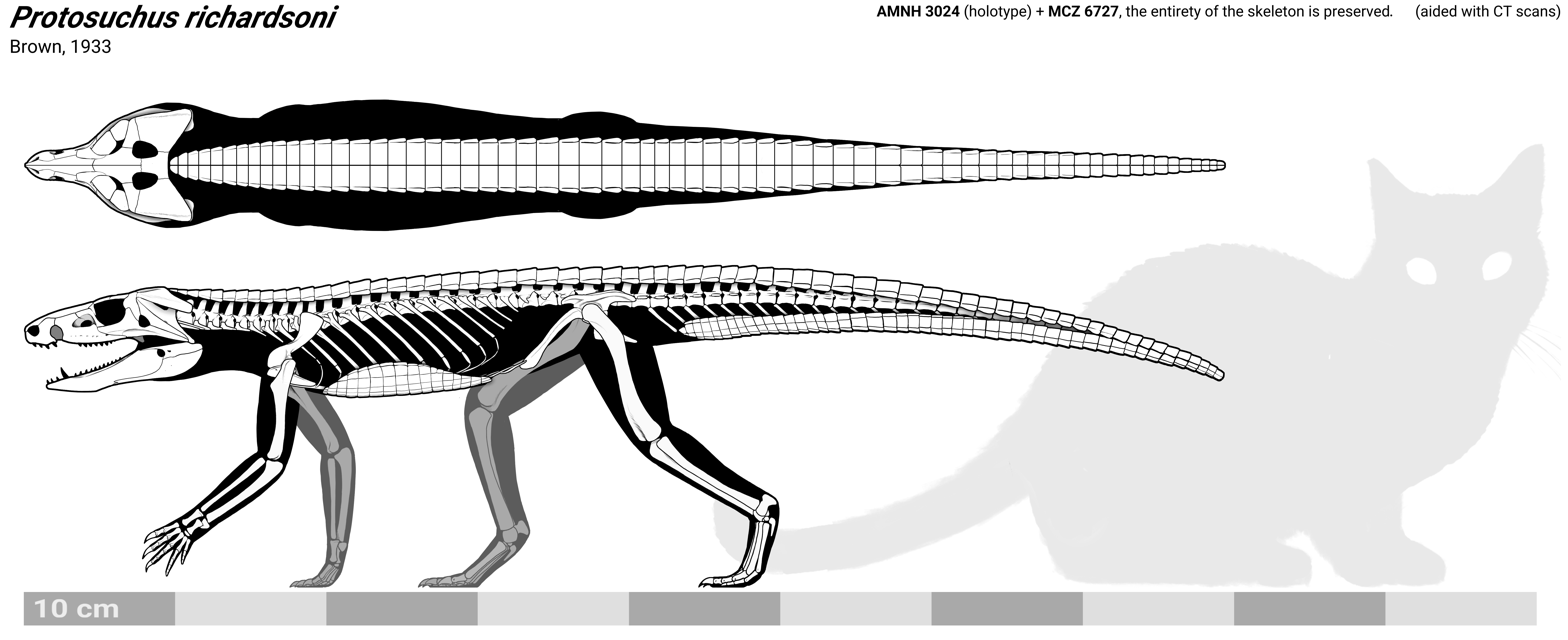
- Skeletal reconstruction

Scientific classification
- Kingdom: Animalia
- Phylum: Chordata
- Class: Reptilia
- Clade: Pseudosuchia
- Clade: Crocodylomorpha
- Family: †Protosuchidae
- Genus: †Protosuchus; Brown, 1934

Species
- P. richardsoni (Brown, 1933) (type); P. haughtoni (Busbey and Gow, 1984); P. micmac Sues et al. 1996

Synonyms
- Archaeosuchus Brown, 1933 (preoccupied); Baroqueosuchus Busbey and Gow, 1984; Lesothosuchus Whetstone and Whybrow, 1983

= Protosuchus =

Protosuchus Temporal range: Early Jurassic

Extinct genus of reptiles

Protosuchus (from Greek: protos, "first" and Greek: souchos, "crocodile") is an extinct genus of carnivorous crocodyliform from the Early Jurassic. It is among the earliest animals that resemble crocodilians. Protosuchus was about 80 centimetres (2.6 ft) in length.

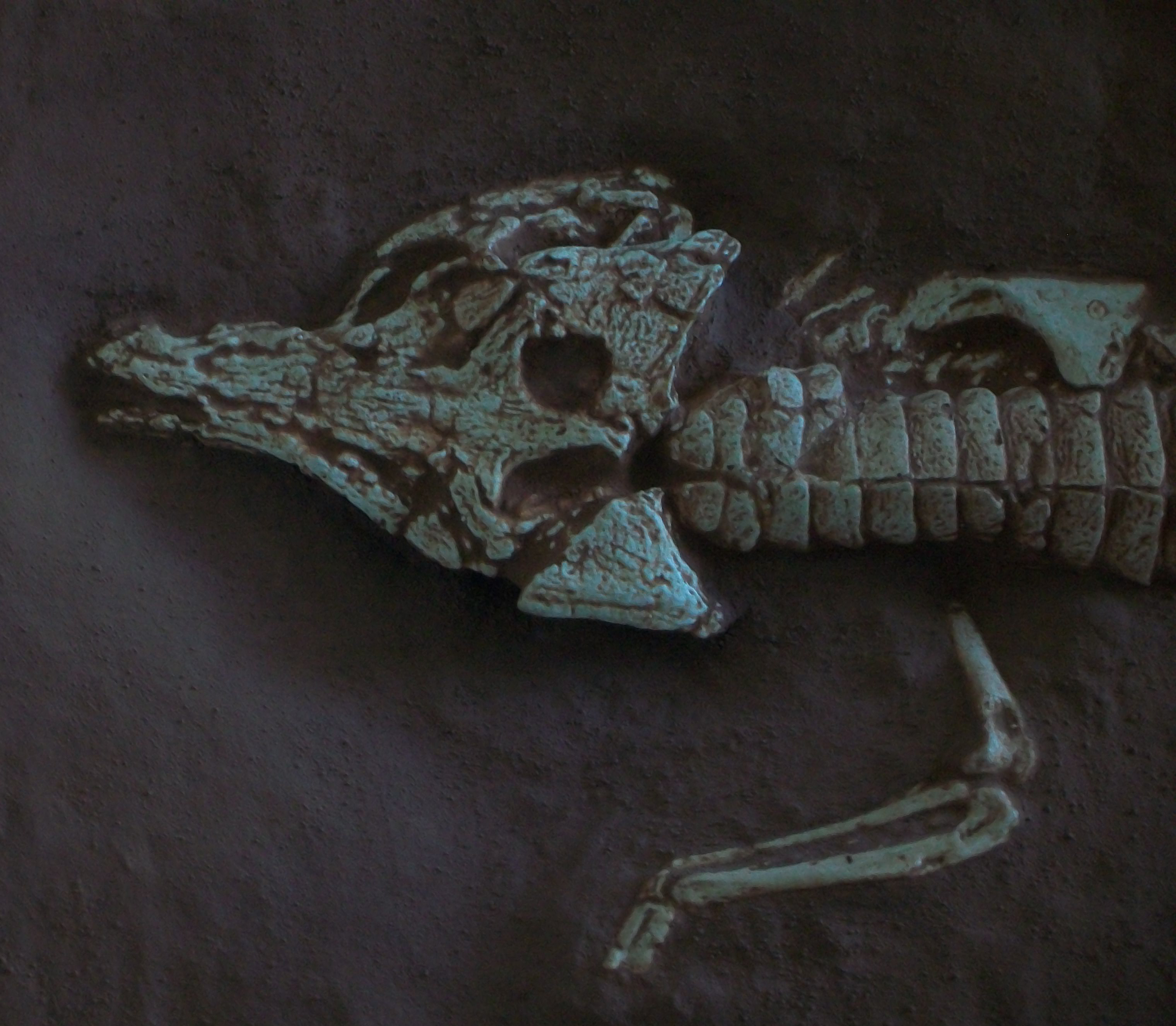
The skull of Protosuchus richardsoni (AMNH 3024)

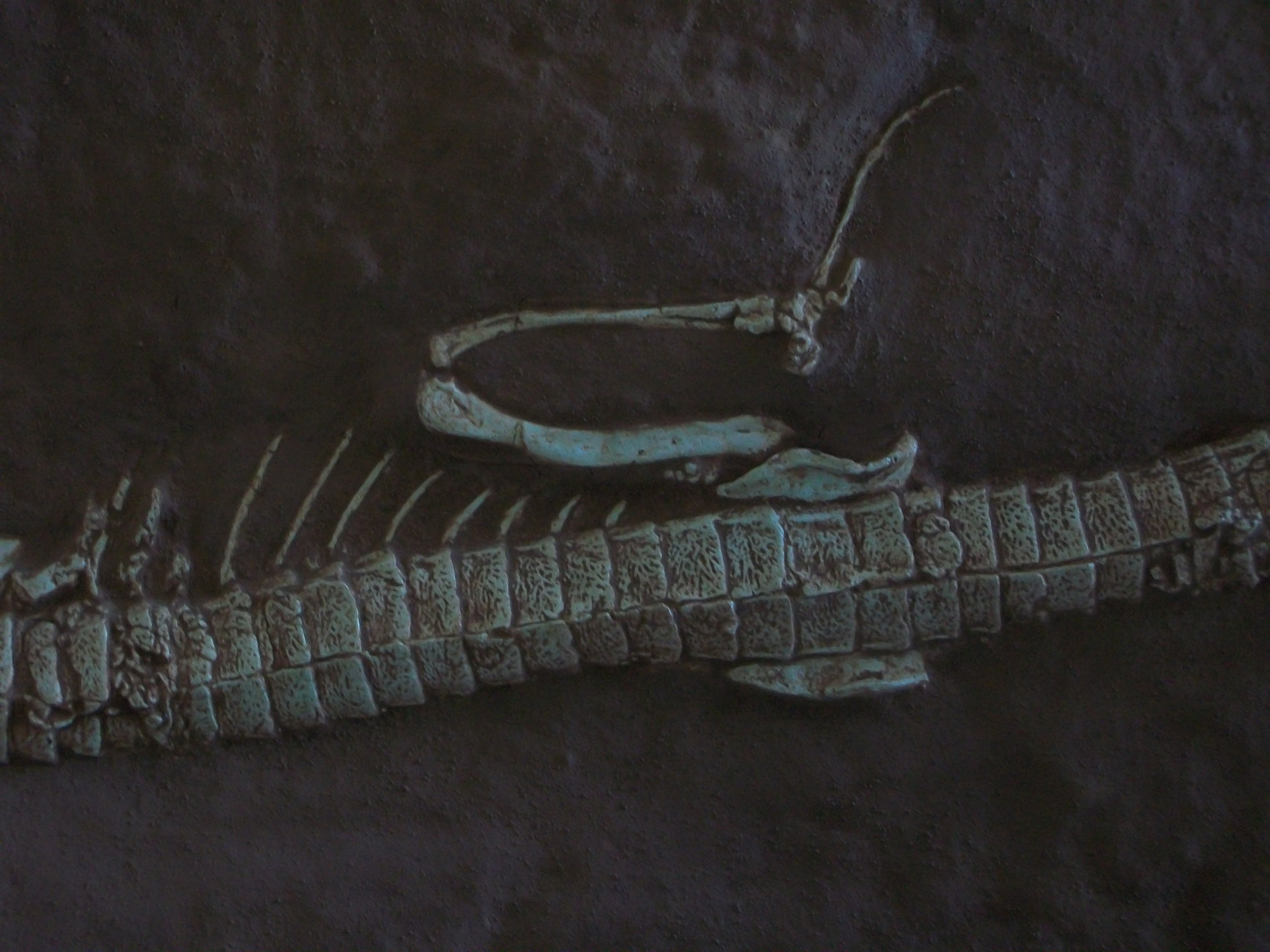
The pelvis and hindlimbs of Protosuchus richardsoni (AMNH 3024)

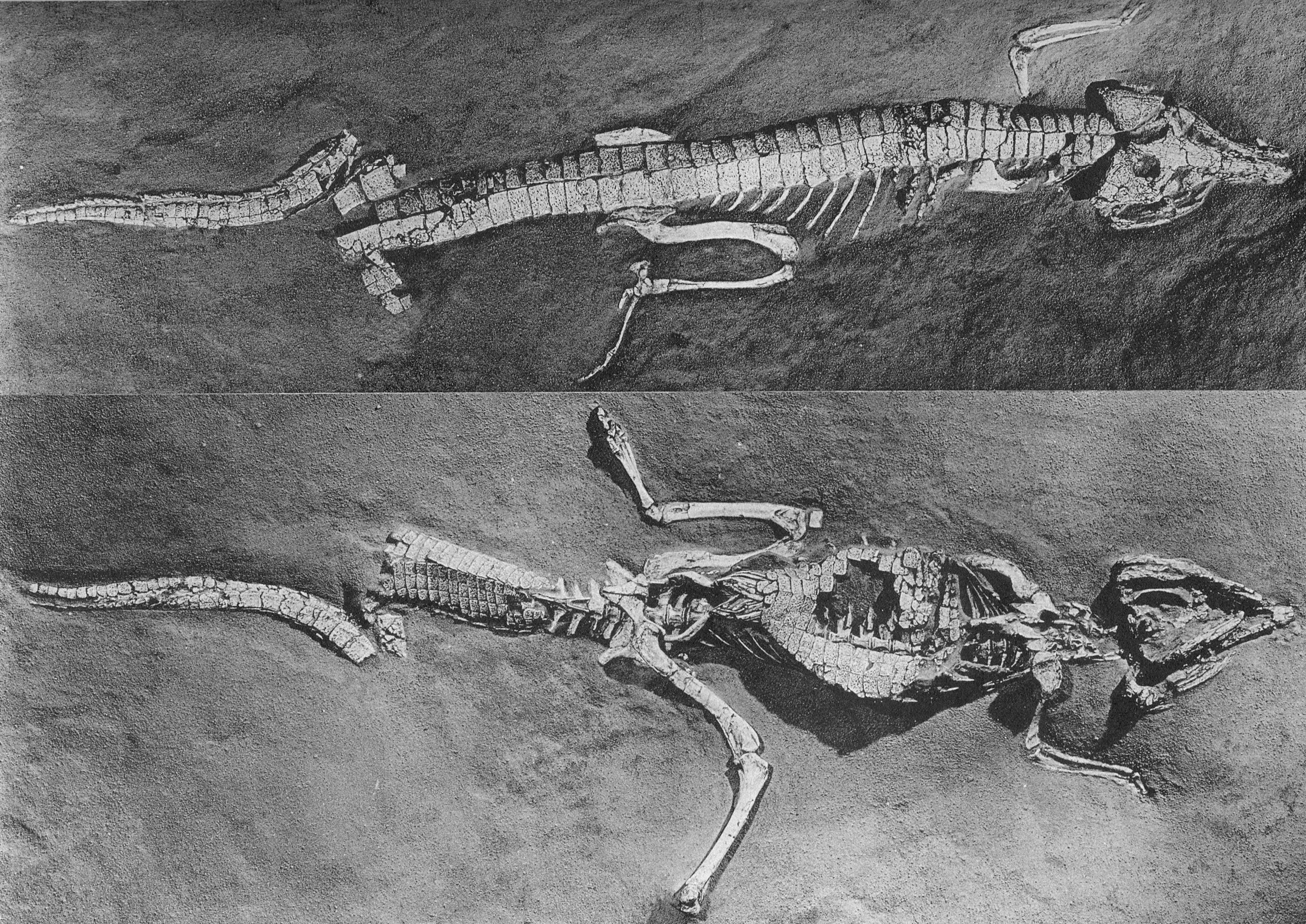
Protosuchus richardsoni fossil AMNH 3024

As an early crocodilian relative, its skull and postcranial anatomy featured more crocodilian characteristics than its earlier ancestors; it had short jaws that broadened out at the base of the skull, providing a large surface to which its jaw muscles could attach. This increased the maximum gape of the animal's mouth and the force with which the jaws could be closed. The dentition of the animal also resembled modern crocodiles, including the teeth in the lower jaw that fitted into notches on either side of the upper jaw when the mouth was closed. It also possessed a powerful tail which later developed into a propulsion mechanism through water in its descendants.

The body was covered and reinforced by osteoderms in a double row along the back and covering the bottom of the body and the entire tail. It was an unusual quadrupedal reptile whose legs were columnar, with the rear legs longer than the front legs.

== Species ==
Three species of Protosuchus have been described: the type species P. richardsoni from Arizona, United States, P. micmac from Nova Scotia, Canada and P. haughtoni from South Africa.
