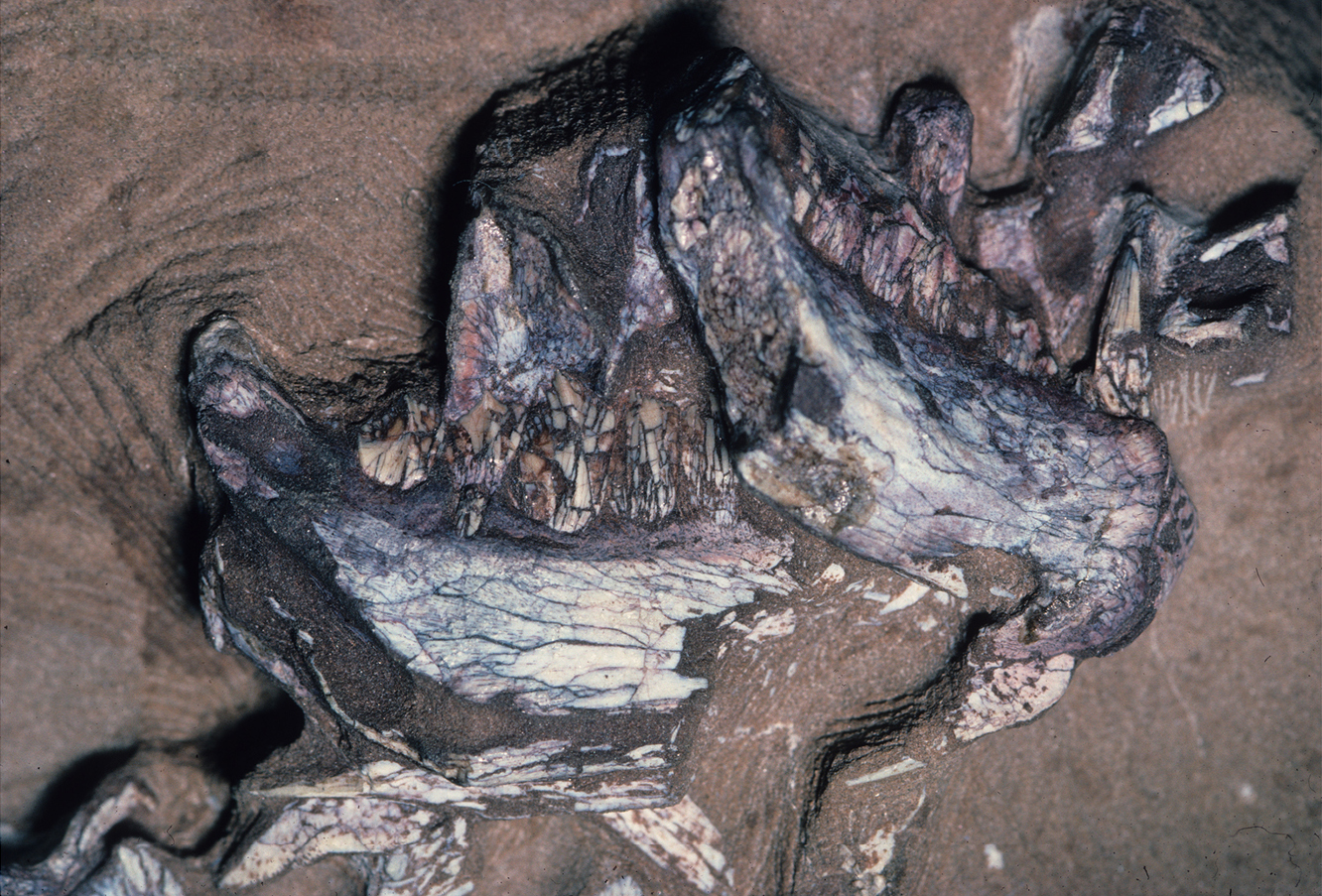
- Lower jaws of holotype SAM-PK-K10488

Scientific classification
- Kingdom: Animalia
- Phylum: Chordata
- Class: Reptilia
- Clade: Dinosauria
- Clade: †Ornithischia
- Family: †Heterodontosauridae
- Subfamily: †Heterodontosaurinae
- Genus: †Pegomastax; Sereno, 2012

Type species
- Pegomastax africana (Note: While originally introduced as Pegomastax africanus, the species name was corrected to Pegomastax africana in order to comply with regulations of the International Code of Zoological Nomenclature, since the Greek word μάσταξ (mastax) is of feminine gender.) Sereno, 2012

= Pegomastax =

Pegomastax Temporal range: Early Jurassic, Sinemurian

Extinct genus of dinosaurs

Pegomastax is a genus of heterodontosaurid dinosaur that lived during the Early Jurassic of South Africa. The only known specimen was discovered in a 1966–1967 expedition in Transkei District of Cape Province, but was not described until 2012 when Paul Sereno named it as the new taxon Pegomastax africana. The genus name is derived from the Greek for "strong jaw", and the species name describes the provenance of Africa; it was originally spelled africanus, was corrected to africana to align with the gender of the genus name.

The only known material of Pegomastax included a partial skull with well-preserved lower jaw and teeth, showing affinities for Heterodontosaurus and the group with a deep jaw, mobile predentary, and a large canine tooth at the front of the snout. The front of the jaws would have supported a keratinous bill, and wear on the teeth suggests that Pegomastax had a herbivorous diet, possibly of tougher plant matter than relatives that lacked the canine. The morphology of the teeth and jaw shows that Pegomastax may have been most closely related to South American taxon Manidens, instead of the other South African or Lesothan genera Heterodontosaurus or Lycorhinus.

Along with many other heterodontosaurids, Pegomastax is known from the upper Elliot Formation. Though of uncertain provenance, it was probably from the middle of the section, making it from the mid Sinemurian and older than all the other heterodontosaurids in the formation. It would have lived alongside an abundance of sauropodomorph taxa like Massospondylus, the ornithischian Lesothosaurus, and crocodylomorphs like Protosuchus, as well as the theropod Megapnosaurus and synapsids like Diarthrognathus and Pachygenelus. The fauna of the upper Elliot is more gracile than that of the lower Elliot, which probably reflects the drier climate at the time.

== History of discovery ==
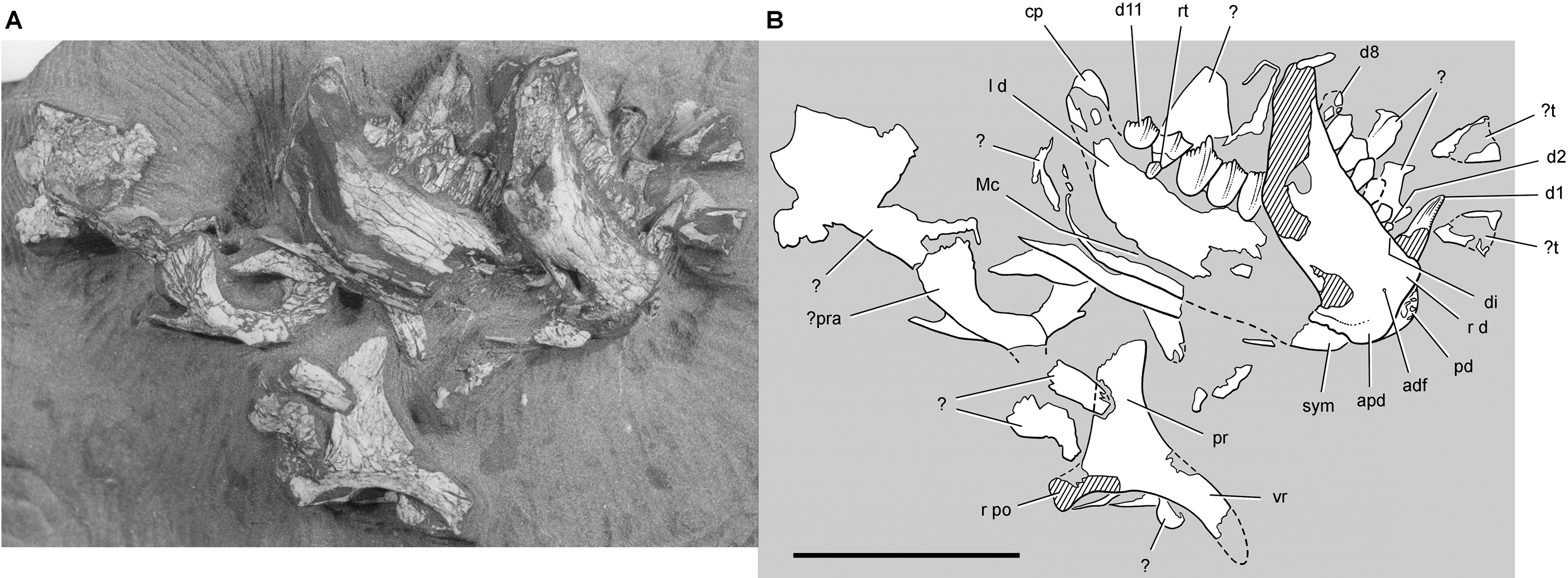
Entire holotype in matrix (left), with interpretative diagram

A partial disarticulated skull of a new taxon of Heterodontosauridae was discovered in the 1966-1967 expedition to the Transkei District of Cape Province, South Africa, found in the upper Elliot Formation at the Voyizane (alternatively Voisana) locality. The specimen, given the accession number SAM-PK-K10488 was found alongside other heterodontosaurid material in Voisana, including the heterodontosaurid postcrania SAM-PK-K1328, the maxillae SAM-PK-K1326 and SAM-PK-K1334, the Heterodontosaurus juvenile skull SAM-PK-K10487, and the complete Heterodontosaurus skull and postcrania SAM-PK-K1332. The specimen SAM-PK-K10488 was identified as a new taxon by American paleontologist Paul Sereno in the 1980s, but remained undescribed until 2012, where designated it as the holotype specimen of the new taxon Pegomastax africanus. The genus name is derived from the Greek words pegos and mastax, meaning "strong jaw", while the species name is from the Latin for "pertaining to Africa". The species name was amended by Sereno later in 2012 to the feminine P. africana, following the feminine gender of the Greek word μάσταξ (mastax).

Pegomastax comes from the Red Beds, or upper Elliot Formation, of South Africa and Lesotho. This part of the formation is considered to be from the earliest Jurassic, the Hettangian and Sinemurian epochs from around 200 to 190 million years ago. The provenance of Pegomastax and the Voisana locality within the upper Elliot Formation is uncertain, but it is likely from the middle deposits of the formation, which places it in the mid-Sinemurian. Pegomastax is known from a single partial skull, which includes a postorbital, both dentaries, a predentary and teeth; prepared from the matrix at Harvard University. The specimen is preserved in a small sandstone block of matrix, and further preparation of CT scanning may allow for the identification of more intermediate bone fragments. The lower jaws are preserved close to their position in life, but bones on the inside are shifted or displaced if they are preserved.

== Description ==
Pegomastax is estimated to have a skull length of 73 mm (2.9 in), compared to Heterodontosaurus at 115 mm (4.5 in) and Tianyulong at 65 mm (2.6 in). It can be distinguished from other heterodontosaurids by having a very deep predentary that projects forwards and down, a curved primary ridge on the dentary teeth, and a concave margin to the crown on either side of the middle denticle. Though there are many similarities to Heterodontosaurus, the unusually deep, parrot-like shape of the predentary was suggested by Sereno to indicate different feeding specializations among different heterodontosaurids.

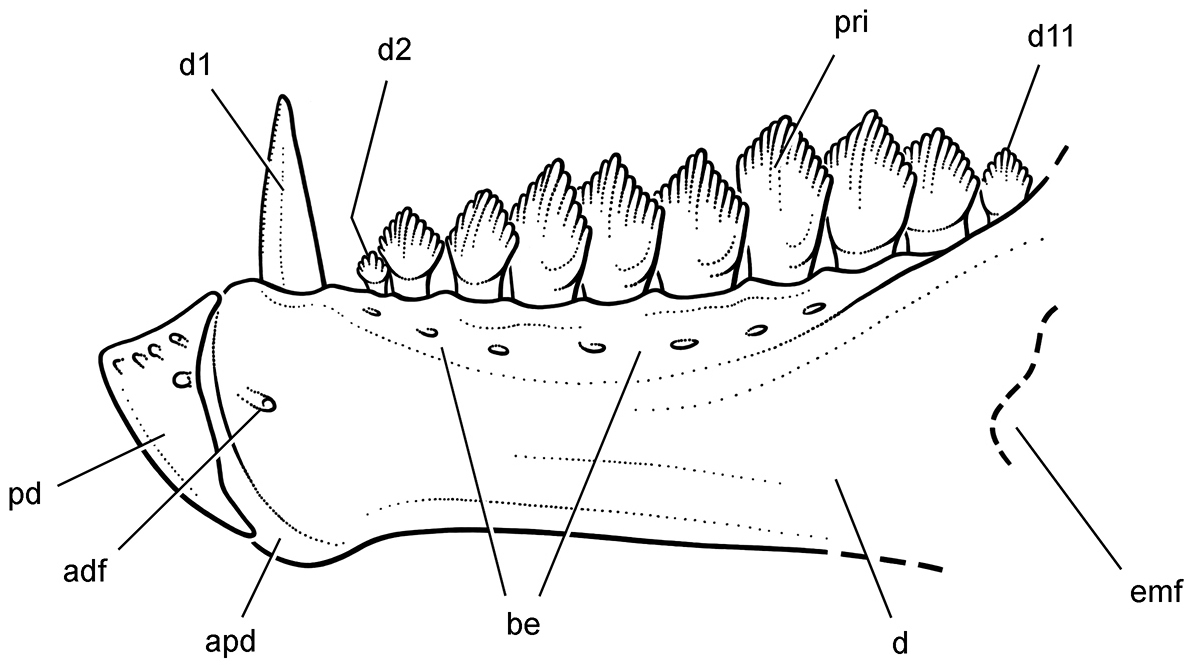
Lower jaw reconstruction of Pegomastax

A postorbital is known for Pegomastax, with a deep rear process more similar to Manidens than Heterodontosaurus. The predentary of Pegomastax is a simple wedge-shaped bone. Like Heterodontosaurus there are no prominent processes, and the predentary sits on a loose and possibly mobile saddle-like articulation at the front of the dentary. Several foramina perforate the dental edge of the predentary, which is angled about 45 degrees below horizontal, and would have supported a keratinous bill. Unlike all other heterodontosaurs the predentary is much taller than long, with the length of the dental margin only 70% of the total height of the bone. Pegomastax has a robust dentary, with the tooth row being 27 mm (1.1 in) and a depth at mid-length of 9 mm (0.35 in). For comparison, the dentary of Heterodontosaurus has an equivalent depth of 10 mm (0.39 in) and a length of 42 mm (1.7 in), though the dentary of Manidens is slightly deeper than Pegomastax. The teeth in the dentary are inset from the cheek by a buccal emargination, and a foramina at the front end of this emargination near the predentary exists, but does not contain a tract as in Echinodon and Fruitadens. The anterior end of the dentary is deeper than the middle, as in Heterodontosaurus and Abrictosaurus.

There were probably 11 teeth in the lower jaw of Pegomastax, the first eight preserved in the right dentary and the last five in the left. A large caniniform tooth is present at the front of the jaw as in most other heterodontosaurids, but unlike in Heterodontosaurus, Abrictosaurus and Lycorhinus the caniniform is straight. Serrations are present on the front edge of the tooth, but absent on the rear. Following the caniniform, there is a toothless diastema in the jaw, following which the teeth rapidly increase in size up to the sixth. All dentary crowns are asymmetrical, with the front edge higher and the crown slightly curving to the rear along its length. The inner face of the rear crowns is worn nearly flat by jaw action. The apical margins of the crowns bear denticles, which are present on both sides and at the end of the prominent primary ridge.

== Classification ==
Originally identified as an intermediate undescribed member of Heterodontosauridae, the 2012 description of Pegomastax and its placement within the family was supported by a phylogenetic analysis by Sereno. Heteerodontosauridae has historically been considered a sister group to Ornithopoda and a derived family of ornithischians, but since have been reclassified as one of the most primitive forms of ornithischians, with similar features like large grasping hands to basal saurischians like Saturnalia, Eoraptor, Herrerasaurus and Eodromaeus. Sereno also considered Pisanosaurus to be a heterodontosaurid, but noted that its inclusion in the family was controversial and subject to change. Pegomastax was recovered as a derived heterodontosaurid in the subfamily Heterodontosaurinae, united with all other African members of the family and the South American Manidens, which was identified as its closest relative based on the asymmetrical shape and curvature of their tooth crowns. Following this analysis, Pegomastax was added to the matrix of Marcos Becerra and colleagues in 2016, who also added the South American postcranial specimen MPEF-PV 3826. The sister group relationship of Pegomastax and Manidens was supported as reproduced below, even when the postcranial specimen was scored as additional material of Manidens.

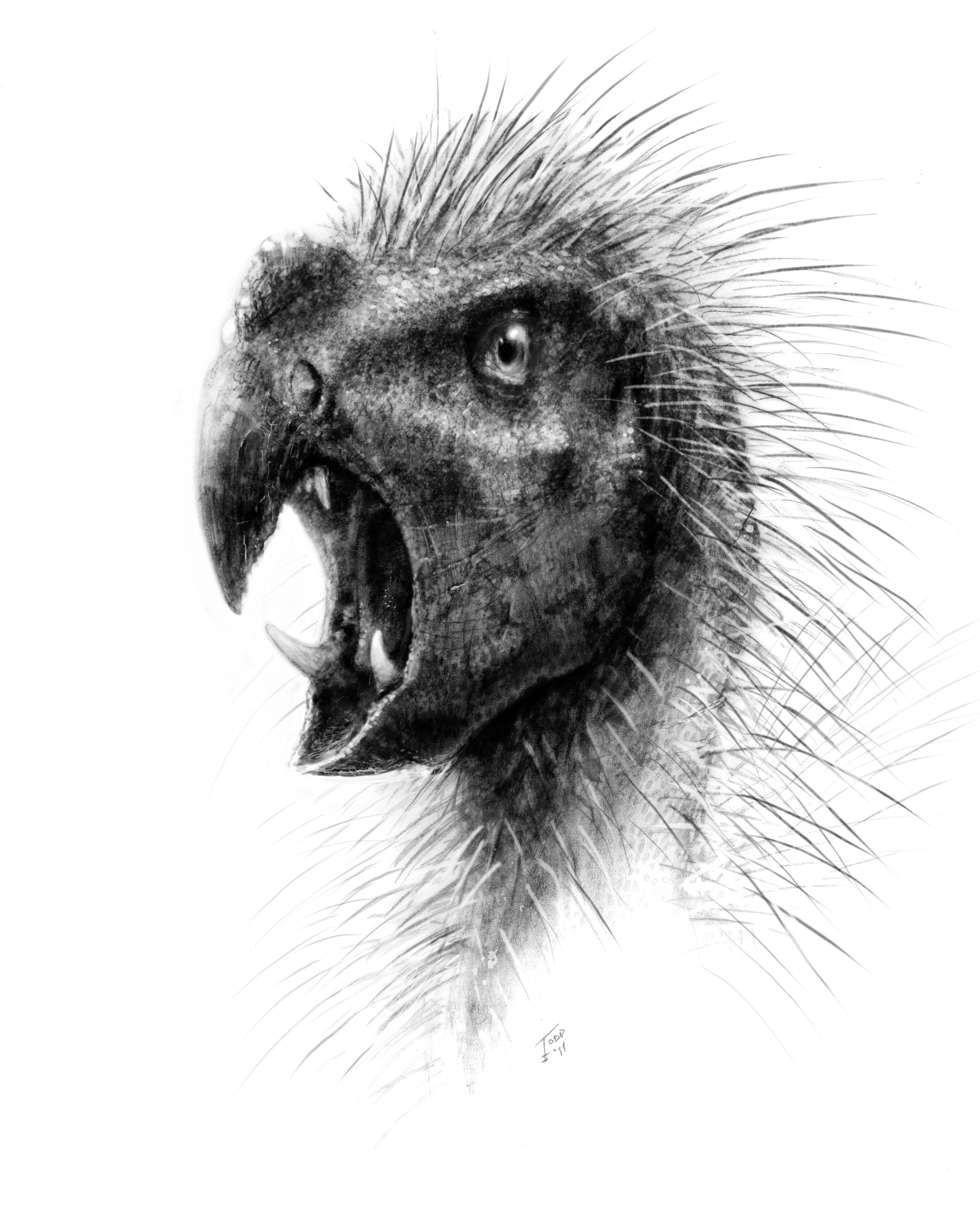
Restoration by Todd Marshall

- Heterodontosauridae
  - - MPEF-PV 3826
    - Tianyulong confuciusi
  - - - Echinodon becklesii
      - Fruitadens haagarorum
    - - Heterodontosaurinae
        - - Manidens condorensis
          - Pegomastax africana
        - - Heterodontosaurus tucki
          - - Abrictosaurus consors
            - - NHMUK A100
              - Lycorhinus angustidens

Alternatively, Pegomastax has been resolved as the sister taxon of a group of Heterodontosaurus and Lycorhinus in the 2017 phylogenetic analysis of Daniel Madzia and colleagues, with Manidens two steps more basal between Tianyulong and Fruitadens, or in an unresolved polytomy with Echinodon and Heterodontosaurus, as was the situation in the 2017 phylogenetic analysis of Fenglu Han and colleagues. Han et al. noted that the internal relationships of Heterodontosauridae were weakly supported and needed more work. While previous analyses have all consistently recovered Heterodontosauridae as a group of basal ornithischians, the analysis by Dieudonne and colleagues in 2020, which did not include Pegomastax, recovered heterodontosaurids within Pachycephalosauria, with Heterodontosaurinae and Fruitadens grouped as the most basal pachycephalosaurs, and Echinodon and Tianyulong closer to true pachycephalosaurs.

== Paleobiology ==
=== Diet and canine function ===
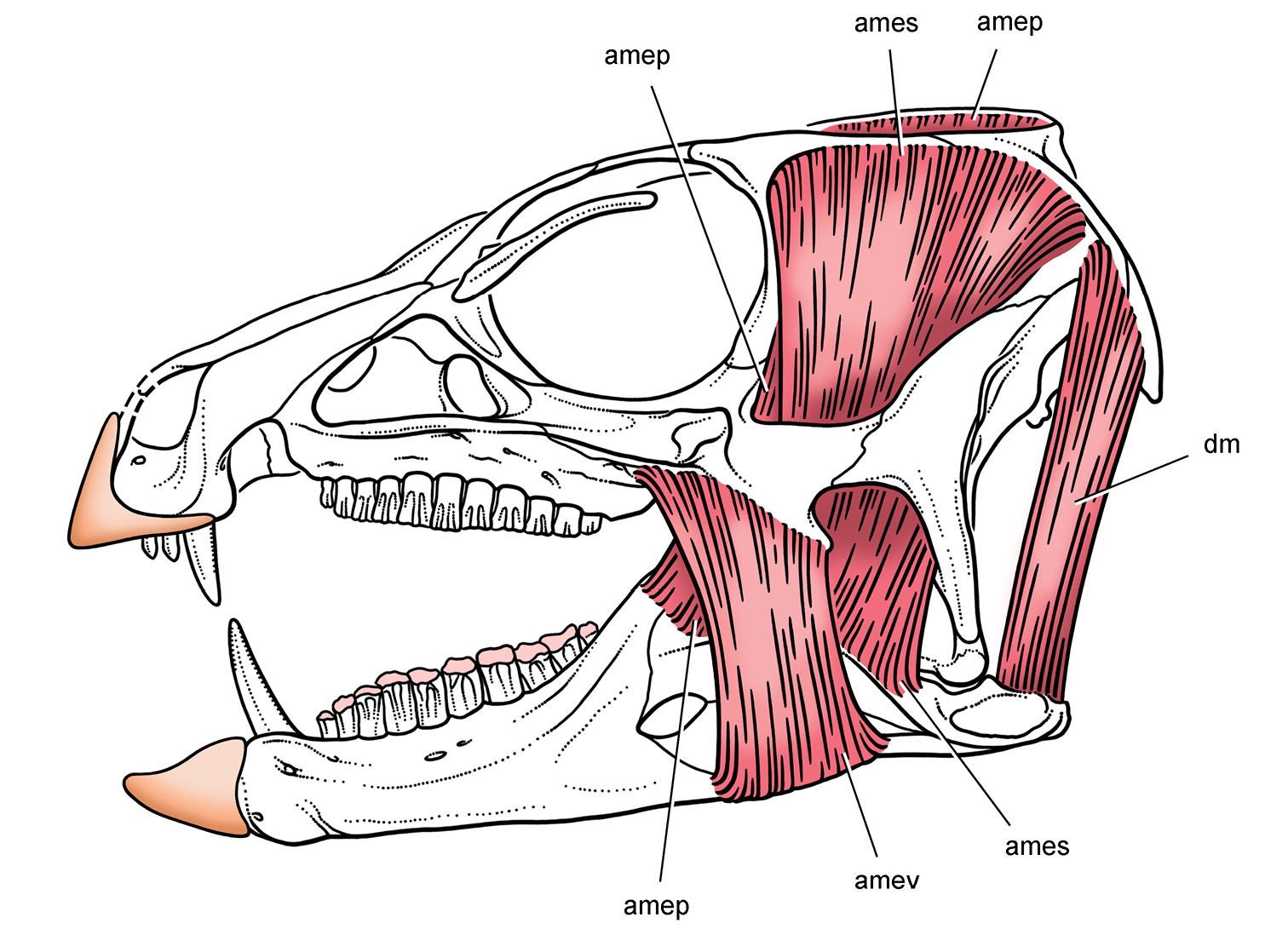
Reconstruction of jaw musculature and keratin sheathing of the beak in Heterodontosaurus

Heterodontosaurids have traditionally been assumed to be herbivorous, alongside all other ornithischians, with the possibilities that the caniniforms were a part of sexual dimorphism based on their absence in Abrictosaurus, which was suggested to be a young or female version of another taxon. Barrett suggested in 2000 that the premaxillary teeth and dentary canine were indications of heterodontosaurids being omnivorous, while Butler and colleagues suggested in 2008 that they were likely used for defense and occasional omnivory, and Porro and colleagues suggested in 2011 that the caniniforms were an indication of a diet of more tough, fibrous vegetation. Norman et al. suggested in 2011 alternatively that the canines were unlikely to have been used for display or cropping and rooting vegetation, as there was no wear from use present and no strong evidence for sexual variation. However, Sereno identified wear facets on the canines of Heterodontosaurus and other heterodontosaurids, though none specifically in Pegomastax. As well, Sereno pointed out that many modern animals have features for display or defense that are identical between sexes, so the use of canines for either could not be ruled out. Sereno considered the canines of heterodontosaurids to be most similar to those of peccaries in form, and suggested that their diet of fruits, roots, grass, acorns, pine nuts and thistles may represent the closest living comparison to heterodontosaurids. A predominantly or exclusively herbivorous diet in Pegomastax could be directly supported by the extensive tooth-to-tooth wear facets it has, which show that it possessed the same adaptations for propalinal (forwards and backwards) jaw movement and processing plant material as other ornithischians.

=== Ecology ===
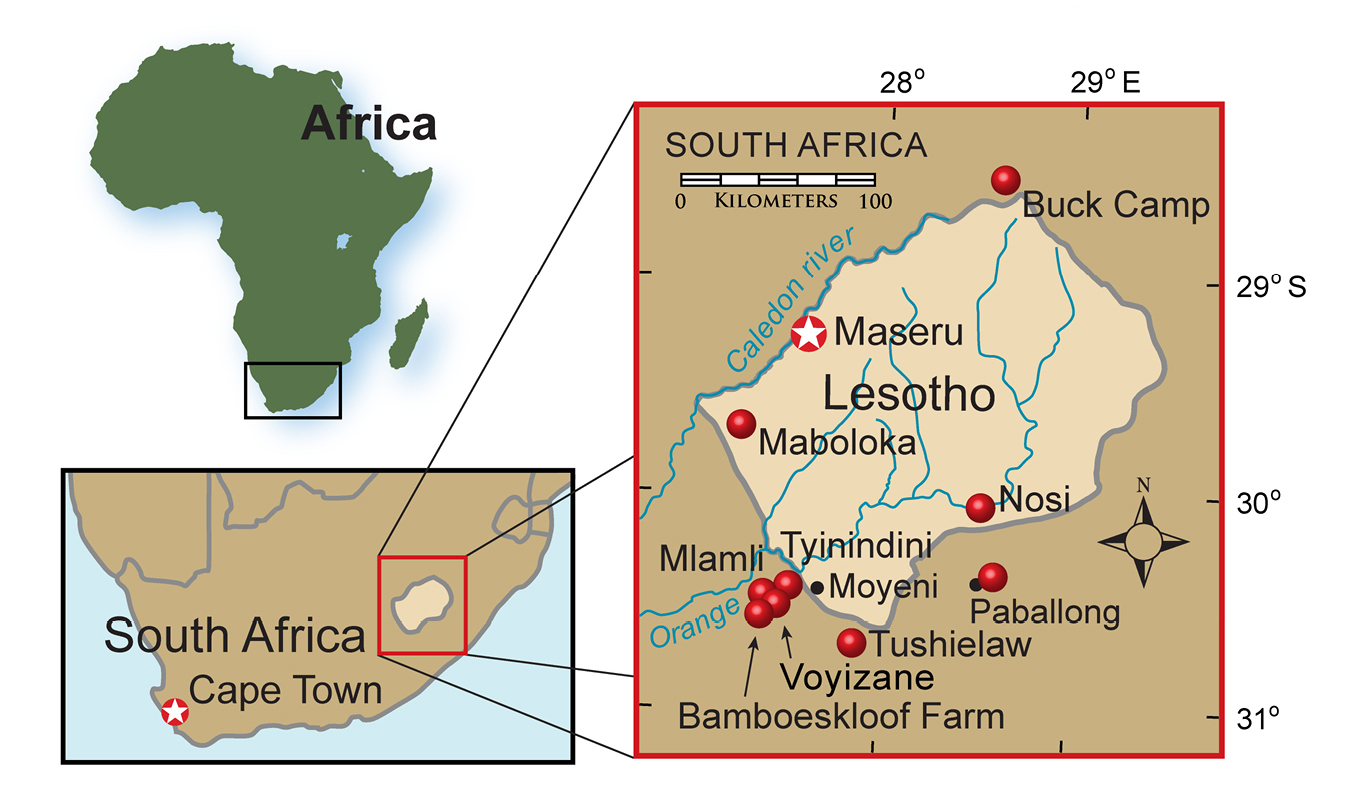
Map of heterodontosaurid localities in South Africa and Lesotho, Pegomastax is known from Voyizane

Pegomastax is known from a specimen found in the Upper Elliot Formation of the Stormberg Group of the southern African Karoo Basin. The Elliot Formation spans the Triassic–Jurassic boundary, with the lower Elliot being mid-Norian to Rhaetian, and the upper Elliot being Hettangian to Sinemurian; 201.3 to 190.8 million years ago. The upper Elliot Formation consists of red to pink fluvial and aeolian mudstones that are rich in organic matter, including all ornithischians yet found in the Elliot Formation. The Upper Elliot Formation is characterised by animals that appear to be more lightly built than those of the Lower Elliot Formation, which may have been an adaptation to the drier climate at this time in southern Africa. Most of the upper Elliot Formation is part of the "Massospondylus Assemblage Zone", the oldest dinosaur-dominated biozone in Gondwana, characterized by the appearance of abundant sauropodomorph Massospondylus fossils as the main index taxon, as well as the co-occurring ornithischian Lesothosaurus and crocodylomorph Protosuchus.

Within the upper Elliot Formation and younger Clarens Formation, sauropodomorphs are the most abundant dinosaur group and make up 58.7% of discovered vertebrate taxa, followed by ornithischians at 5.9%, and theropods at 2% of the abundance. Most of the named sauropodomorphs have been found in the middle of the upper Elliot Formation where Pegomastax likely originates from, including Aardonyx, Antetonitrus, Arcusaurus, Ignavusaurus, Ledumahadi, Massospondylus and Pulanesaura. The position of the individual heterodontosaurid specimens within the rock succession is poorly known, making it difficult to determine how many of these species really were coeval, and which species existed at separate times. However, estimations for age of uncertain discoveries suggests that Pegomastax was older than all other heterodontosaurids, and the only other ornithischian it coexisted with was the index taxon Lesothosaurus that can be found throughout the entire upper Elliot Formation. Only the theropods Megapnosaurus and Dracovenator are known from the upper Elliot Formation, and both likely lived at the same time as Pegomastax.

Among non-dinosaur taxa, members of Eucynodontia are the most common in the upper Elliot formation, with both Diarthrognathus and Pachygenelus coexisting with Pegomastax. Other synapsids are far less common, but Tritylodon and Megazostrodon are both known from the middle of the deposits. Protosuchus represents the only crocodylomorph that definitively lived alongside Pegomastax, with Litargosuchus either being the same age or older. Australochelys is the only turtle known from the Elliot Formation, and it may be older than Pegomastax or overlap in age, as both are of uncertain provenance. Unnamed amphibians from the family Chigutisauridae likely overlapped with Pegomastax in age, as well as intermediate fish species of the genus Ceratodus. Other fishes and the sphenodontian Clevosaurus are also known from the upper Elliot, but are younger than the suspected age of Pegomastax. Some invertebrates are known from the Massospondylus Assemblage Zone, including the crustacean Lepidurus, the beetle Coleopterus, the wood cockroach Phthartus, orthopteran Striatotegmen, the cricket Archaegryllodes, and intermediate brachiopods and crustaceans. Plants are represented by the horsetails Equisetum and Equisetites, the cycadeoid Otozamites, the conifers Sphenolepidiurn and Pinus, the seed ferns Phoenicopsis and Dicroidium, algal mat Spirogyra, and fossil wood and pollen of Agathoxylon, Podocarpoxylon, Araucarioxylon, Lacrimasporonites, Uvaesporites and Cyathidites.
