= Todd Marshall (disambiguation) =

Todd Marshall (born 1998) is an Australian rules footballer.

Todd Marshall may also refer to:

- Todd Marshall (artist), American illustrator and paleoartist
- Todd Marshall, a character in the 1999 film Wing Commander, portrayed by Matthew Lillard
