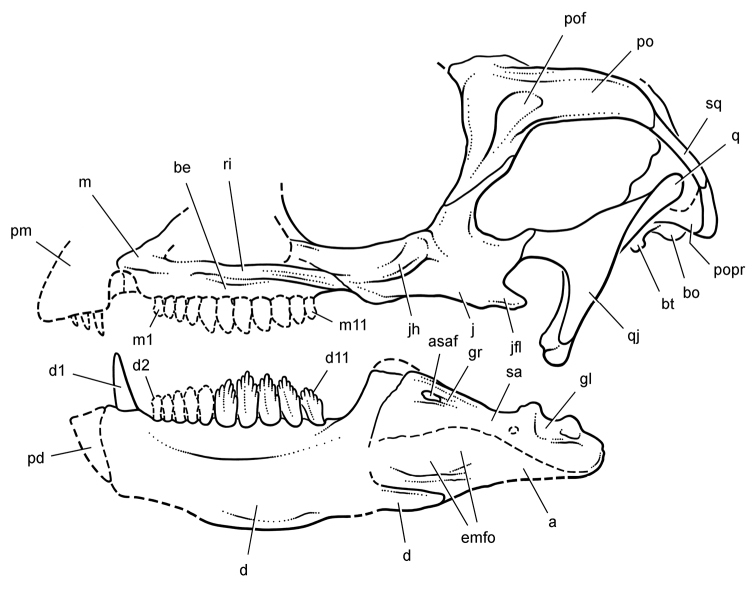
- Skull reconstruction

Scientific classification
- Kingdom: Animalia
- Phylum: Chordata
- Class: Reptilia
- Clade: Dinosauria
- Clade: †Ornithischia
- Family: †Heterodontosauridae
- Subfamily: †Heterodontosaurinae
- Genus: †Manidens; Pol et al. 2011

Type species
- †Manidens condorensis Pol et al. 2011

= Manidens =

Manidens Temporal range: Middle Toarcian~179.17–178.07 Ma

Extinct genus of dinosaurs

Manidens is an extinct genus of heterodontosaurid dinosaur from the Early Jurassic of Patagonia. It is a sister taxon of the closely related Pegomastax from South Africa. Fossils have been found in the Cañadón Asfalto Formation in Chubut Province, Argentina, considered to be originally dated to the Bajocian, latter were found to be from Toarcian beds.

== Etymology ==
The type species of Manidens, Manidens condorensis, was described in the journal Naturwissenschaften in 2011. Manidens was named in by Diego Pol, Oliver Rauhut and Marcos Becerra. The generic name is derived from Latin manus, "hand", and dens, "tooth", a reference to the hand-shaped form of the posterior lower teeth. The specific name refers to the village of Cerro Cóndor, located near to the Queso Rallado site where the specimen was found by zoologist Guillermo Rougier.

== Description ==
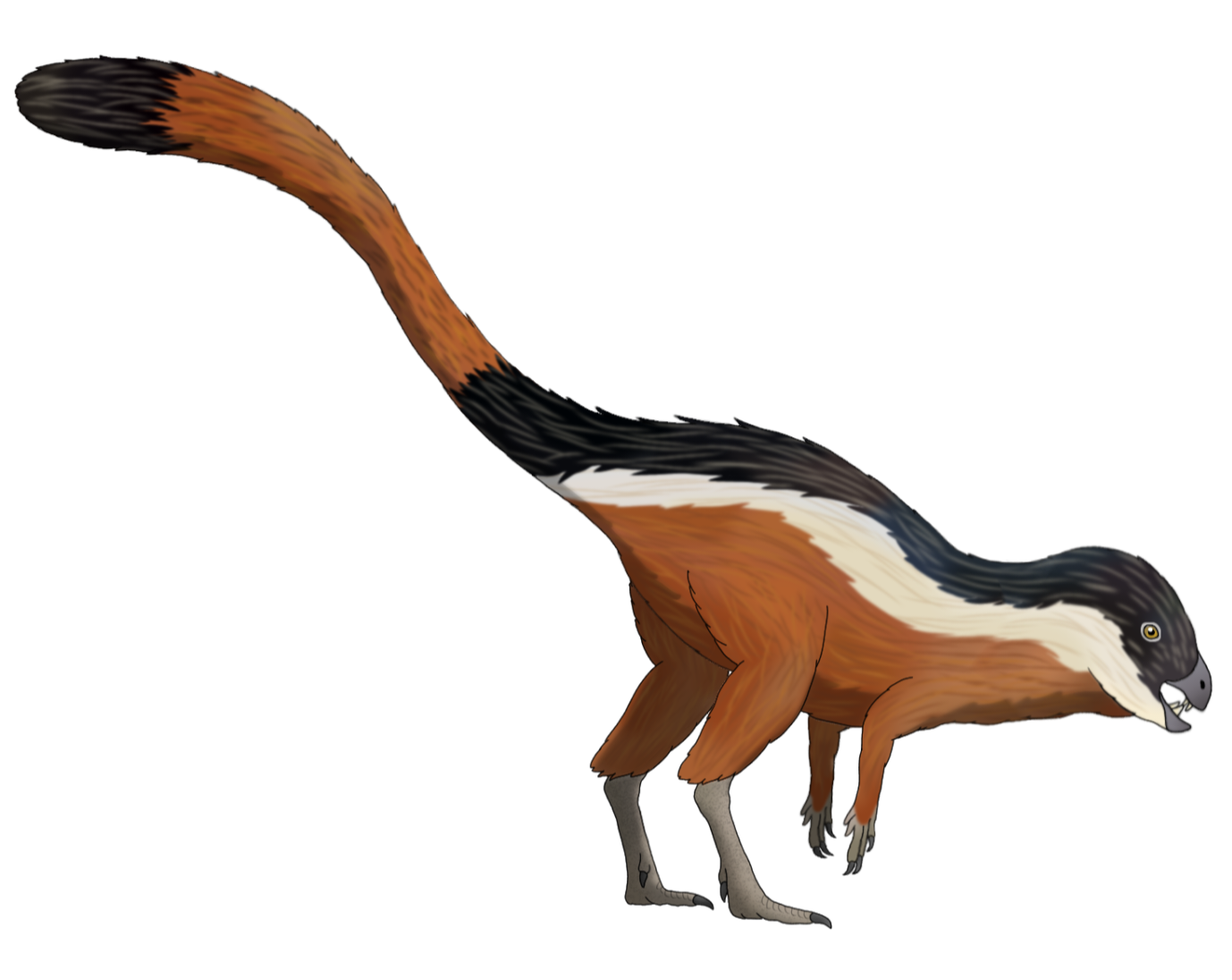
Life restoration

The holotype specimen of Manidens, MPEF-PV 3211, consists of a partial skeleton with a skull and lower jaw, including the axial column except most of the tail; a left shoulder girdle; and the pelvis. The specimens MPEF-PV 1719, 1786, 1718, 3810, 3811, isolated posterior teeth, from the same locality and horizon as the holotype specimen are also referred to this genus. MPEF-PV 3211 consists of 11 partially articulated fragments from a single individual, with several specimens separated: the right quadrate (MPEF-PV 3211-5), right quadratojugal (MPEF-PV 3211-6), right postorbital (MPEF-PV 3211-7), a complete pelvic girdle and sacral region with six sacral vertebrae (MPEF-PV 3211-1), one cervical vertebra (MPEF-PV 3211-8), two dorsal vertebrae (MPEF-PV 3211-2 and MPEF-PV 3211-4), and a caudal vertebra (MPEF-PV 3211-3). Some bones could not be fully separated due to overlapping and were left in three blocks of associated remains (MPEF-PV 3211-9, MPEF-PV 3211-10, and MPEF-PV 3211-11).

Other specimens include partial articulated specimens, skull & associated elements as well referred isolated teeth: MPEF-PV 3809, MPEF-PV 3808, MPEF-PV 10867, MPEF-PV 1719, MPEF-PV 1786, MPEF-PV 1718, MPEF-PV 3810, MPEF-PV 3811, MPEF-PV 3812, MPEF-PV 3813, MPEF-PV 3814, MPEF-PV 3815, MPEF-PV 3816, MPEF-PV 10866.

The cervical vertebrae are shorter than the dorsal vertebrae and feature short, stout diapophyses and parapophyses, with the anterior cervical having strongly elongated, hypertrophied epipophyses, similar to those in Heterodontosaurus. Both cervical and dorsal neural spines are elongate anteroposteriorly and low. The sacrum contains six vertebrae, with their neural spines forming a continuous bony sheet over the ilium. An anterior caudal vertebra possesses a low, elongated centrum with well-developed chevron facets.

Only the left coracoid and proximal part of the scapula are preserved, displaying a prominent, hook-like posteroventral process separated from the glenoid cavity by a wide notch. The pelvic girdle is mostly intact except for the distal ends of the pubes and ischia. The ilium is low and elongated, with the preacetabular process making up about half of the bone's total length. A longitudinal ridge runs along the lateral surface of the preacetabular process, though it is less pronounced than in Heterodontosaurus. Unlike Heterodontosaurus and other basal ornithischians, where the pubic peduncle is longer than the ischial peduncle, in Manidens the pubic peduncle is subequal or slightly shorter than the ischial peduncle. As typical of ornithischians, the pubis is opisthopubic with a very slender posteroventral shaft. The prepubic process is short, extending only slightly beyond the pubic peduncle of the ilium anteriorly, and is robust. A small obturator foramen is located below the acetabulum. The ischium is more robust than the pubis, with an extensive medial suture along its shafts, which are rectangular in cross-section. There is not enough of the shaft preserved to determine the presence or absence of an obturator process.

The specimens were found in the Queso Rallado locality of the Cañadón Asfalto Formation, dating originally to the Aalenian–Early Bathonian stages, 171 ± 5 to 167 ± 4 Ma, yet where latter constrained to 179-178 million years, that is Middle-Late Toarcian.

Manidens was a relatively basal heterodontosaurid that grew to about 60 cm (2.0 ft) in length and 500 g (18 oz) in body mass, smaller than later heterodontosaurids. It has high-crowned teeth indicative of an increased adaptation to a herbivorous diet but lacks the wear facets seen in more advanced forms like Heterodontosaurus. Manidens is the sister taxon of a clade consisting of the African species Heterodontosaurus, Abrictosaurus and Lycorhinus, indicating an early radiation of the heterodontosaurids. The discovery of filamentous integumentary structures in the related Tianyulong suggests that they may also have been present in other heterodontosaurids such as Manidens.

=== Skull ===
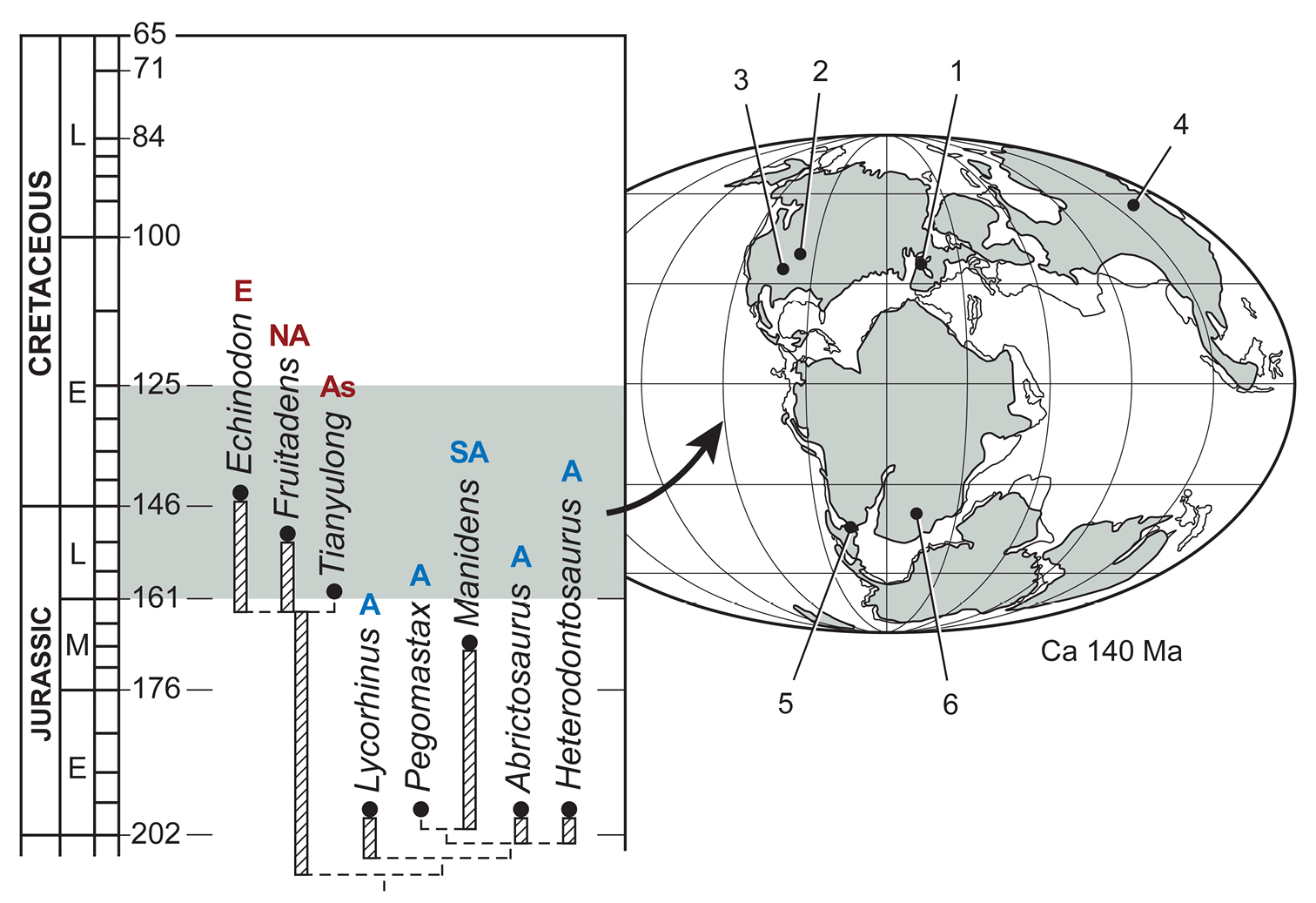
Biogeographic distribution in time for heterodontosaurids included in the phylogenetic analysis

Several Autapomorphies were identified, including postorbital has a tubercle-like thickening at the base of the jugal process, positioned between the orbit and the lowest part of the postorbital fossa, oriented dorsoventrally, jugal process of the postorbital reaches the main body of the jugal, with the jugal contributing minimally to the posterior orbit boundary. The coronoid has a triangular posterior process extending further back than the coronoid process of the dentary with the anterior foramen of the surangular featuring a wide, anteriorly developed fossa that becomes fusiform posterior to the foramen. Regarding the mandibluar fenestra & the dentition is completely closed, with a small foramen in the surangular, showing strong heterodonty between the maxillary and dentary cheek teeth, with symmetrical diamond-shaped maxillary teeth and asymmetrical diamond-shaped (hand-shaped) dentary teeth. The maxillary dentition shows crowns with sharp mesial and distal entolophs in the mid-posterior region, with a distal entoloph in the anterior teeth, cingular entolophs are located near the midsection of the lingual crown face and directed apically, paracingular fossae between the cingular entolophs and the rest of the crown and mesial/distal cingular entolophs are differently ornamented, with mesial entolophs having 2-6 denticles and distal entolophs having small serrations. Other maxillary features include obliquely oriented distal ectolophs forming a conspicuous crest on the labial face, posterior maxillary crowns having a shelf-like denticulated mesial ectoloph and a sub-cingular crest running apicobasally at the distal end of the mesial entoloph in mid-posterior crowns. Other diagnostic features are found in the postorbital Fossa, deep only at the junction between the main body and the squamosal process, without forming a pocket-like recess, the posterior exit of the quadrate foramen being wide and posterolaterally oriented and a jugal having a robust, posterodorsally oriented crest ("jugal boss").

The Revision of the Skull Osteology allowed to reinterpret it´s diagnosis:

- The lateral process of the jugal, initially thought unique, varies among Heterodontosaurus specimens. Its orientation, not presence, is now considered autapomorphic for Manidens.
- The postorbital process of the jugal, initially described as unique, is now known to be widely distributed among ornithischians and results from taphonomic distortion.
- The absence of a mandibular fenestra at the surangular-angular-dentary contact is confirmed as an autapomorphy, though a small external opening in the surangular is present.
- Additional cranial features, such as the continuation of the antorbital fossa and the enlarged forebrain facet, have been refined through CT scans and 3D reconstruction, requiring further comparison with other heterodontosaurids for confirmation.

Tooth replacement was asynchronous in Manidens, which exhibited dental replacement in a continuous anterior-to-posterior wave pattern. Furthermore, Manidens represents the first known occurrence of a heterodontosaurid with dental replacement of its caniniform teeth, which may have had distinct timing relative to its cheek dentition.

=== Postcranea ===
The postcranial skeleton of Manidens includes elements from the vertebral column, ribs, girdles, and limited appendicular bones. The axial series features completely fused neurocentral junctions in all preserved vertebrae, indicating an advanced growth stage. Cervical vertebrae are relatively short with robust processes for rib attachment, including distinctive proatlases (first reported in heterodontosaurids) that articulate with the skull base. Dorsal vertebrae are longer and barrel-shaped, with varying transverse process lengths and neural spine heights that increase posteriorly in some positions, accompanied by slender, curved thoracic ribs. The sacrum consists of six fully fused vertebrae, with extensive fusion of centra, zygapophyses, and most neural spines, supported by robust sacral ribs that anchor to the ilium; ossified tendons are present along the sacral region, likely providing dorsal stiffening. Caudal vertebrae show elongated centra in anterior positions, with prominent transverse processes and facets for chevrons, transitioning to shorter processes further back.

The pectoral girdle comprises a fused scapulocoracoid with a straight to gently curved scapular blade, a modest acromion ridge, and a plate-like coracoid featuring a hooked posteroventral process and a centrally placed foramen. The pelvic girdle is well-developed, with an elongated ilium having a prominent, ventrally deflected preacetabular process (about 42% of total length), a fully open acetabulum lacking a medial shelf, distinct muscle scars including a bony antitrochanter on the ischial peduncle, and a shorter postacetabular process with a narrow brevis shelf. The opisthopubic pubis includes a short prepubic element and a slender postpubic rod, while the ischium has a straight shaft with a longitudinal groove for muscle attachment and contributes to an elongated obturator foramen.

Scattered appendicular remains include a probable pedal phalanx from the fourth digit and a flattened proximal carpal bone. Rib histology reveals poorly vascularized parallel-fibred bone with minimal remodeling and no growth interruptions, consistent with sustained but moderate growth rates. Overall, these features align Manidens closely with other heterodontosaurids while showing unique traits in sacral fusion and girdle proportions.

=== Phylogeny ===
Cladogram after Pol et al., 2011:

- Ornithischia
  - Pisanosaurus
  - Echinodon*
  - - Heterodontosauridae
      - Tianyulong
      - - Fruitadens
        - - Manidens
          - - Abrictosaurus
            - BMNH A100
            - Heterodontosaurus
            - Lycorhinus
    - - Eocursor
      - Genasauria

*Note: Pol et al. regard Echinodon as a genus of Heterodontosauridae.

== Paleoecology ==
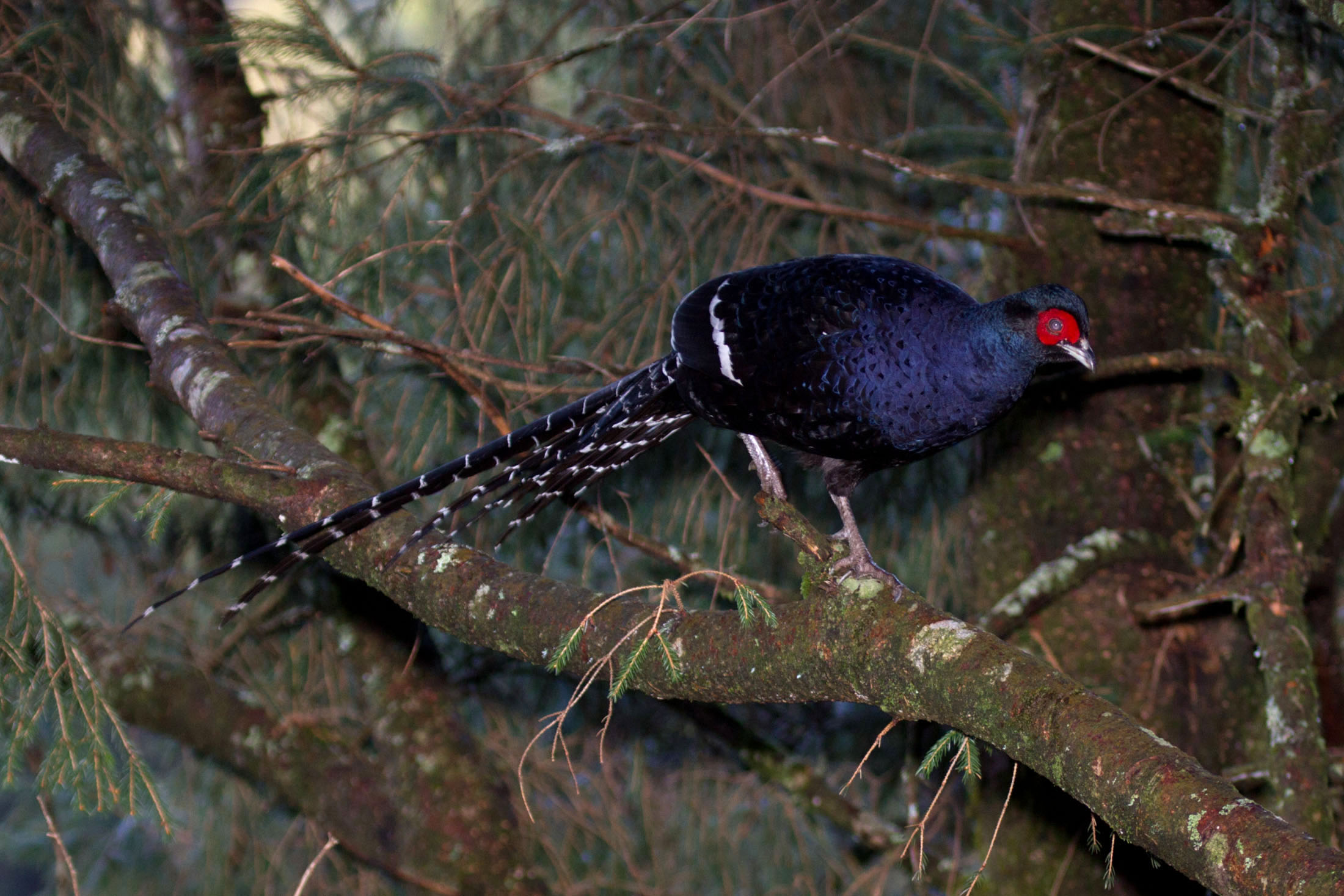
Specimens referred to Manidens suggest potential arboreal capabilities, like in tree-perching birds (As example, Syrmaticus mikado)

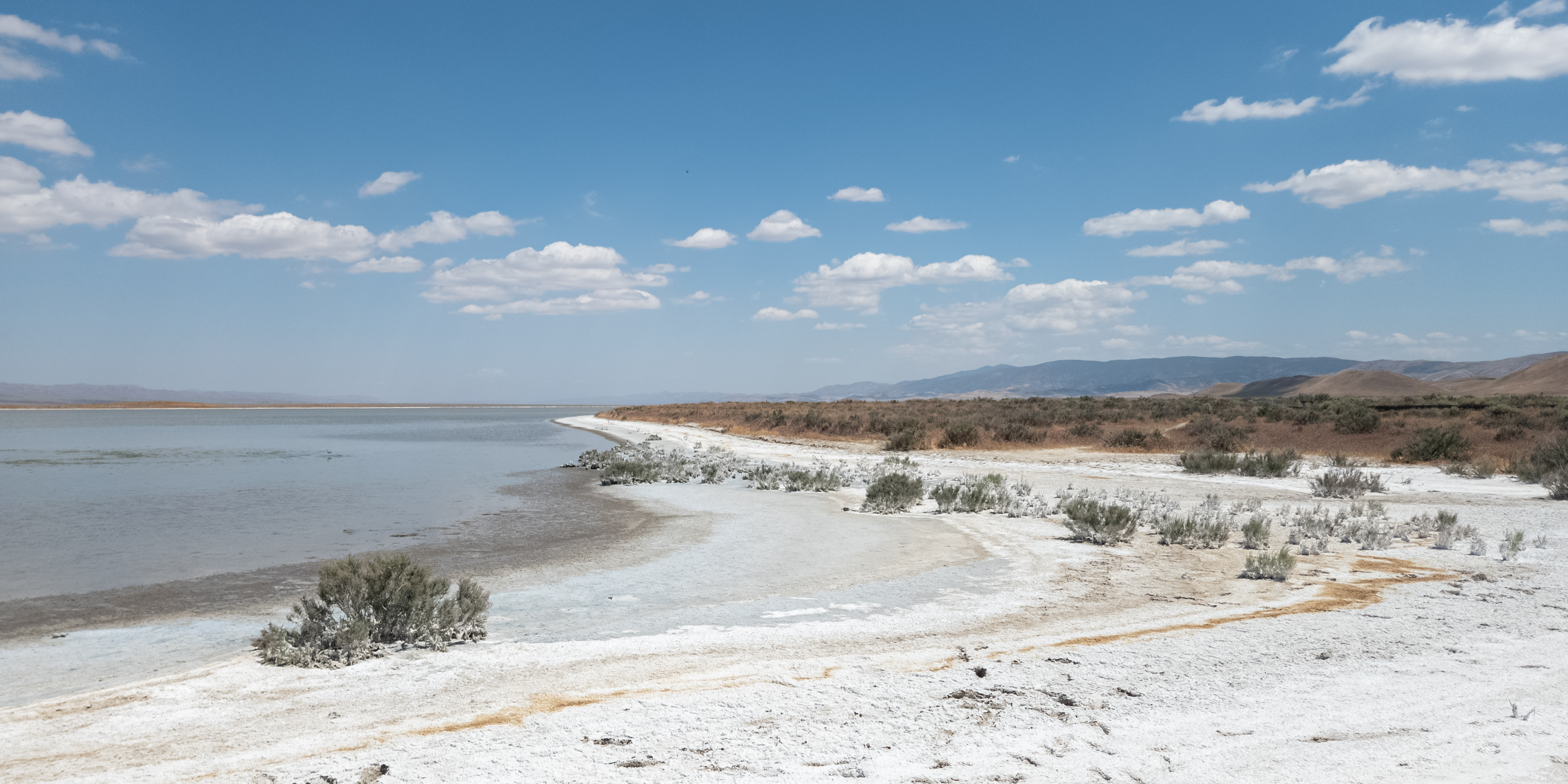
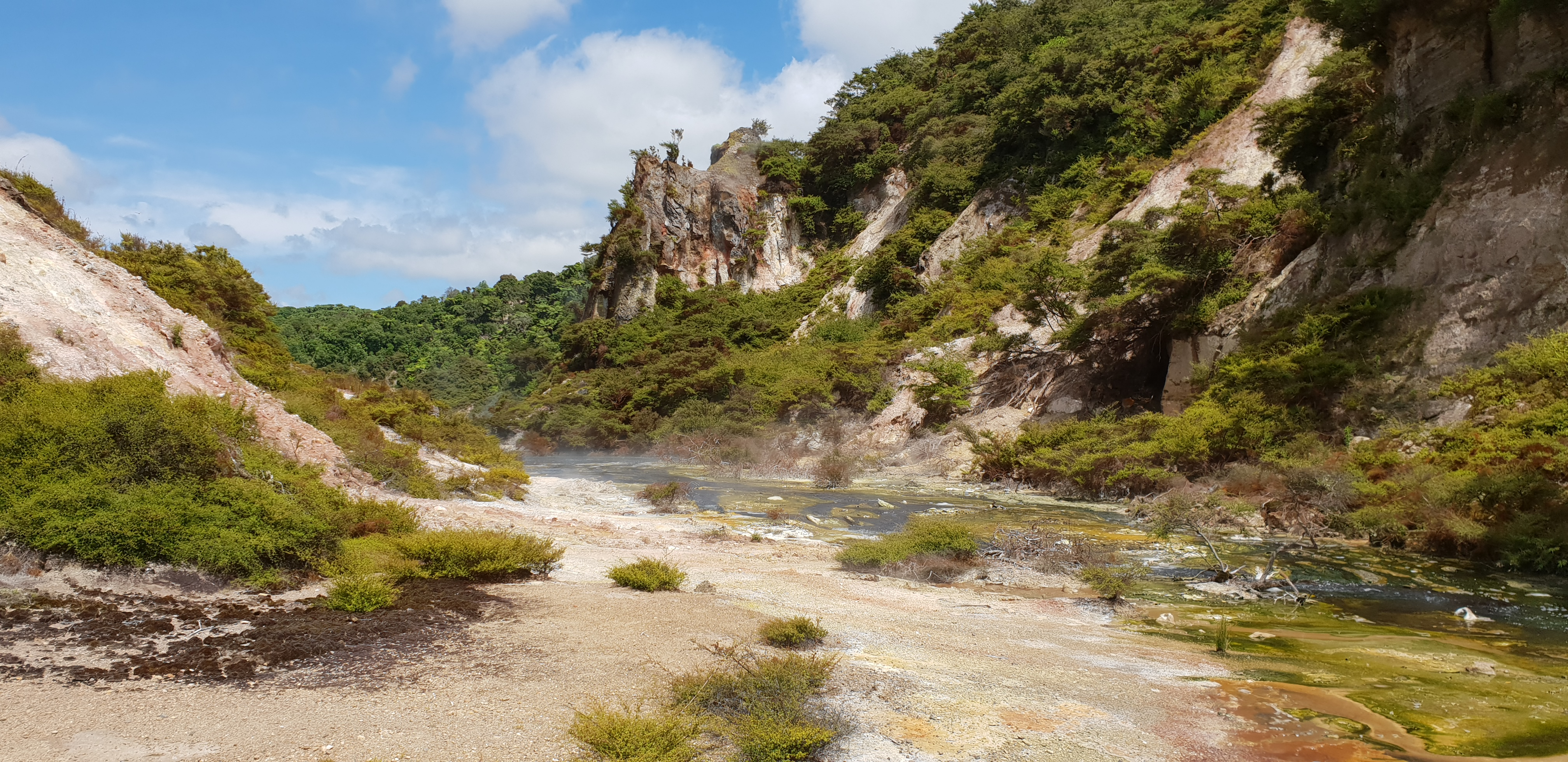
The Chacritas Member hosted volcanic-influenced soda lake (Example from modern California), while nearby environments hosted varied floral belts from coastal Cheirolepidaceous forests to highland Podocarps (Modern Equivalent from New Zealand), a rift area with nearby volcanic influence of the Chon Aike Province

The holotype of Manidens comes from the Chacritas Member of the Cañadón Asfalto Formation. This member is mostly made of two major depositional settings: lacustrine and fluvial deposits, that have intervals of tuffaceous materials, suggesting this environments coevolved with volcanic activity. Palustrine littoral environments levels are seen at Cerro Cóndor and Estancia Fossati, characterized by the presence of lacustrine limestones interbedded with shales, tuffs and sandstones. The lacustrine section has been called the "Chacritas Paleolake", and seems to have been a rather saline or even hypersaline hydrologically closed pan lake, shallow in deep, with marginal zones and palustrine subenvironments made of low-energy ramp-like margins.

Fossils attributed to Manidens from Argentina indicate that this dinosaur may have been at least partially arboreal. The specimens consists of a series of bones from both hind feet and a few tail vertebrae, and are tentatively attributed to Manidens on the basis of provenance. The long toe bones indicate that the toe bones were capable of grasping; distinct anchor attachments for the muscles and tendons of the hallux indicate that its hallux was smaller than the rest of the toes but could still have grasped. Principal component analysis found that the feet of Manidens were most similar to those of tree-perching birds.

Based on the unusual morphology of its teeth, it has been speculated that Manidens may have been partially carnivorous, as has occasionally been suggested for heterodontosaurids.
