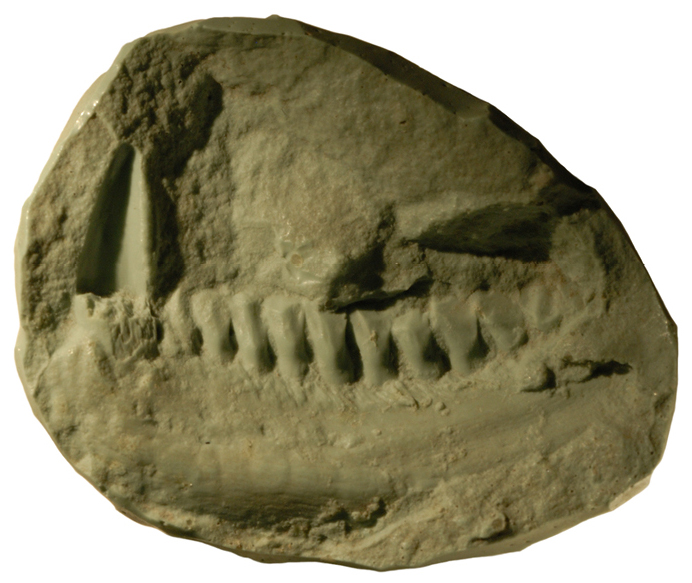
- Silicon mold of holotype in University of Chicago

Scientific classification
- Kingdom: Animalia
- Phylum: Chordata
- Class: Reptilia
- Clade: Dinosauria
- Clade: †Ornithischia
- Family: †Heterodontosauridae
- Subfamily: †Heterodontosaurinae
- Genus: †Lycorhinus; Haughton, 1924

Type species
- †Lycorhinus angustidens Haughton, 1924

Synonyms
- ?Lanasaurus scalpridens Gow, 1975

= Lycorhinus =

Lycorhinus Temporal range: Early Jurassic, Sinemurian

Extinct genus of dinosaur from the early Jurassic of South Africa

Lycorhinus is a genus of heterodontosaurid ornithischian dinosaur that lived during the Early Jurassic, in the Sinemurian. It is known from a single species L. angustidens, that was named in 1924 by Sidney H. Haughton as a cynodont for a partial jaw found in the Upper Elliot Formation of South Africa. The genus name is derived from the Ancient Greek words for "wolf" and "nose". The limited material available, which has degraded over time to only be represented now by a single original tooth and the impression of the remaining jaw and teeth, has resulted in multiple different interpretations of the diagnostic nature and synonymy of Lycorhinus, including the treatments of the type species of Heterodontosaurus, Abrictosaurus, and Lanasaurus as either species of Lycorhinus or synonyms. The latest review of Lycorhinus accepted the synonymy of Lanasaurus scalpridens, named in 1975 by Christopher Gow for a maxilla from Golden Gate Highlands National Park, with Lycorhinus angustidens, and also the referral of a partial skull found at the same locality as the original holotype decades later. Tentative specimens from the Clarens Formation have also been considered allied with Lycorhinus, but they may be better treated as remains of indeterminate heterodontosaurids.

== History and naming ==
Prior to 1914, Dr. Martin Ricono collected multiple specimens from the "Red Beds" of Paballong, Mount Fletcher district of South Africa, sending them to the South African Museum. Among this material was a lower jaw fragment identified and described in 1924 by Sidney H. Haughton as the holotype of a new cynodont, SAM 3606. This partial jaw showed a canine tooth and 11 molars (four as impressions), and the partial jaw bone supporting them. Only the inner side of the jaw could be seen because of the rock surrounding the specimen, but Haughton gave it the new binomial name Lycorhinus angustidens. From the same deposits within a 0.40 km (0.25 mi) Ricono and Alexander du Toit also collected material of the cynodont Tritheledon and thecodont Sphenosuchus. The genus name comes from the Ancient Greek words λύκος (lykos), meaning "wolf", and ῥῑνός (rhinos), meaning "nose".

Robert Broom revisited Lycorhinus in a 1932 review of South African early mammals, incorrectly identifying the type locality as Witkop near Burgersdorp. He noted that the original specimen is no longer in the same condition, with the jaw and all of the molars being lost and only remaining as an impression of the external surface within the bone; only the canine remained as original fossil. Broom had also mentioned the species "Lycorhinus parvidens" in passing in 1913 as a therocephalian from the Permian of South Africa, but this was a mistaken identity of Alopecorhinus parvidens. The identity of Lycorhinus as a cynodont was maintained until 1962, when Alfred Walter Crompton and Alan Jack Charig described the new Triassic ornithischian Heterodontosaurus, and reidentified Lycorhinus as well after being alerted to it by John Attridge.

The "Red Beds" of South Africa are now known as the Elliot Formation, with the locality of Paballong located at 30°26′S 28°31′E and within the Upper Elliot Formation. Historically the entire Elliot Formation has been considered Triassic in age, but reevaluations of the fauna has resulted in the Upper Elliot Formation to be interpreted as Early Jurassic, which would make it one of few fossiliferous formations to span the End-Triassic mass extinction event. Uranium-lead dating done in 2020 confirmed that the Upper Elliot Formation spans approximately 10 million years of the Early Jurassic, from approximately the Triassic-Jurassic boundary 201.3 mya until at least the late Sinemurian 191.9 mya. The exact age of Lycorhinus is uncertain as its locality is approximate, but it is likely from the younger sediments of the Upper Elliot Formation.

=== Heterodontosaurus and Abrictosaurus ===
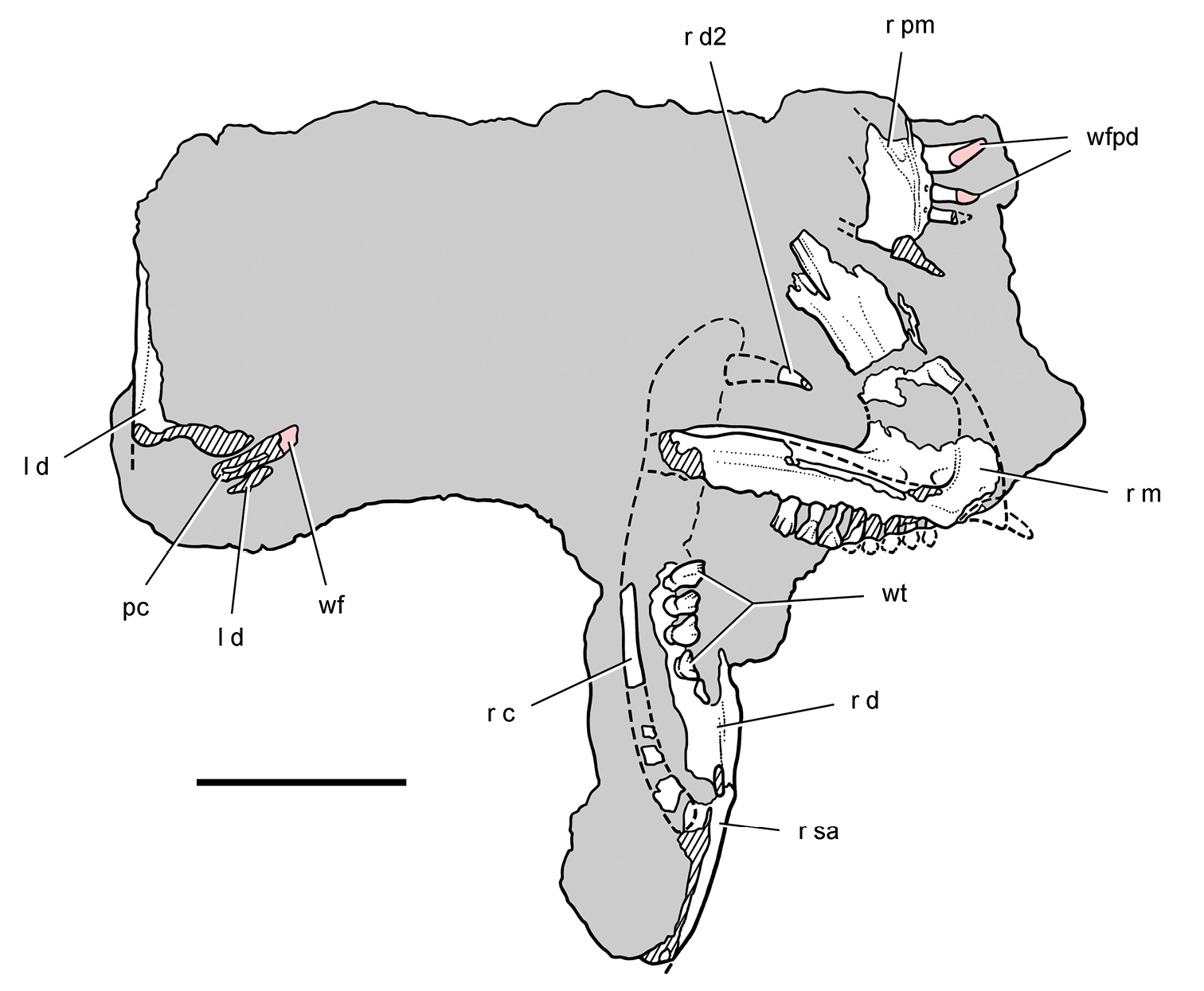
Block of specimen NHMUK RU A100

A second significant specimen was referred to Lycorhinus by Richard Anthony Thulborn in 1962. This specimen was found by Kenneth Kermack at Paballong during a 1960-1961 expedition financed by the Royal Society, and became part of the collections of the University College London as specimen A.100. As it was from the same locality as the holotype of Lycorhinus, Thulborn gave it the designation of topotype, and noted that it was possible but unlikely that it came from the same individual as described by Haughton decades previously. UCL A.100 is fragmentary pieces of a skull, identified by Thulborn as including a partial premaxilla, maxilla, jugal, postorbital, frontal, nasal, and mandible with many teeth. From the similarities to Heterodontosaurus in the teeth and skull, Thulborn considered H. tucki to be referrable to Lycorhinus as the new combination Lycorhinus tucki, rendering Heterodontosaurus a junior synonym, separated by minor aspects of the tooth anatomy and geologic age. For Lycorhinus (including Heterodontosaurus), Thulborn gave the group name "lycorhinids" in 1971, though Heterodontosauridae had been named in 1966 by Oskar Kuhn and Alfred Sherwood Romer independently including Heterodontosaurus but not Lycorhinus.

In 1974 Thulborn named another species of Lycorhinus, L. consors. This species was founded upon UCL B54, found by Kermack and Frances Mussett during the 1963-1964 expedition of the UCL to Lesotho (then known as Basutoland) between the settlements of Whitehill and Qacha's Nek at the village of Noosi. The specimen was collected from a stream flowing north into the Orange River that is crossed at the village by the road from Whitehill to Qacha's Nek around 6.1 m (20 ft) below a small waterfall. These sediments form part of the top of the "Red Beds", but no finer stratigraphy could be determined. UCL B54 was the only known specimen and holotype of L. consors, preserving a partial skull and skeleton, though the quality of preservation of the skeleton meant further fossil preparation was required before it could be adequately described.

The synonymy of Lycorhinus and Heterodontosaurus, as well as their taxonomy, were contested by Crompton and Charig in 1974. They noted that regardless of synonymy, Heterodontosauridae would have priority over Lycorhinidae, and if they were members of Hypsilophodontidae the name Heterodontosaurinae would be appropriate. As the material of Heterodontosaurus is much better, it did not make sense to consider the two genera synonyms but the species separate, instead of retaining the genera as separate, so that the better material could remain diagnostic of a genus. Charig and Crompton found that UCL A.100 could not be considered the same species as Lycorhinus angustidens, weakening the synonymy of the genera, and instead supported that at least three separate heterodontosaurids were present in South Africa, all distinguished by anatomy of the lower jaws and teeth. Despite the differences between Heterodontosaurus tucki, UCL A.100, and Lycorhinus angustidens in the teeth, Charig and Crompton found the limited and poor material of the latter was insufficient to determine if it could be the same genera and thus considered Lycorhinus a nomen dubium.

James Hopson assessed the synonymy of Lycorhinus and Heterodontosaurus in 1975 using access to the original material of all the relevant species. The holotype of Lycorhinus preserved only the original canine in medial view within a chunk of mudstone, with the remaining teeth and jaw as an impression of the lateral surface. Though differences in the presence of denticles along the canine tooth were used to separate Lycorhinus and Heterodontosaurus, their absence in the former was determined to be the result of damage; originally they were present on both margins. The nature of wear on the tooth crowns and their replacement were also revised, supporting the separation of Lycorhinus angustidens from UCL A.100 as well as L. consors, for which Hopson gave the new genus name Abrictosaurus. The differences from Heterodontosaurus were also enough that Hopson considered Lycorhinus diagnostic rather than dubious, and that at least three genera of heterodontosaurids were present. UCL A.100 was provisionally referred to Abrictosaurus as their tooth anatomy were not distinct enough to justify separation, though canines are present in UCL A.100 and absent in UCL B54.

=== Lanasaurus and possible specimens ===
The separation of Lycorhinus, Heterodontosaurus, and UCL A.100 was maintained in 1975 by Christopher Gow in his description of another heterodontosaurid, though L. consors was considered a nomen dubium due to its inadequate description. Gow described a nearly complete maxilla he had found in the Red Beds at the "buck camp" of Golden Gate Highlands National Park, 28°30′S 28°37′E. This specimen, Bernard Price Institute number 4244, was named Lanasaurus scalpridens, separated by its tooth anatomy from all other heterodontosaurids. The genus name was derived from the Latin word lana, "wool" in honour of A.W. "Fuzz" Crompton who initiated the program of collecting in the Red Beds, while the species name referred to the chisel-shaped teeth. Thulborn maintained Heterodontosaurus tucki and Abrictosaurus consors as species of Lycorhinus in 1978, but supported the distinction of Lanasaurus and proposed it may not be a heterodontosaurid. In 1980, Hopson instead supported the distinction of Heterodontosaurus, Abrictosaurus and Lycorhinus, but could only preliminarily support Lanasaurus and suggested it may be determined to be a synonym of Lycorhinus if overlapping material were known.

Subsequently, Gow described a new heterodontosaur maxilla he had found with James Kitching in 1984. This maxilla, BP/1/5253, was found in the farm Bamboeskloof in Lady Grey, South Africa, at 30°45′S 27°12′E, less than 15 km (9.3 mi) from localities of Heterodontosaurus, approximately 130 km (81 mi) from the type locality of Lycorhinus, and about 350 km (220 mi) south of the type locality of Lanasaurus. Most of the maxilla was known allowing direct comparisons to Lanasaurus, and re-examination of Lycorhinus was performed, where it was determined that both the upper and lower jaws showed the same pattern of tooth wear and replacement, and had a similar bowing along their length. From this, and the similarities in dental anatomy to the exclusion of Heterodontosaurus, Gow considered Lanasaurus scalpridens a junior synonym of Lycorhinus angustidens, to which he referred the holotypes of both species, the new referred maxilla, and UCL A.100. Both UCL A.100 and UCL B54 are now part of the collections of the Natural History Museum, London as specimens NHMUK RU A100 and NHMUK RU B54.

Reviews of heterodontosaurids in 1990 and 2004 accepted the identifications of Hopson with Lycorhinus including Lanasaurus, but UCL A.100 identified as a specimen of Abrictosaurus. South African heterodontosaurids were reviewed again in 2011 by David B. Norman and colleagues, though further preparation of several specimens and additional material were needed for more definitive assessments. Lycorhinus was distinguished from Heterodontosaurus and Abrictosaurus on the basis of a combination of dental anatomy in the jaw, though comparisons with Lanasaurus could not be done due to the lack of overlap. Differences previously proposed to separate NHMUK RU A100 from Lycorhinus were largely due to preservational or interpretation differences, but the lack of adequate anatomy between the specimens meant they were not understood to be a single taxon. NHMUK RU A100 was instead referred to Lanasaurus, which was retained as a separate taxon due to the lack of overlap with Lycorhinus.

Four additional heterodontosaurid specimens were described in 2010 by Laura B. Porro and other researchers, with two being considered cf. Lycorhinus: NHMUK RU C68 and C69. The former is a partial right dentary and teeth while the latter is an articulated but partial skull with vertebrae and a femur. Both were collected by Kermack and Mussett as part of the 1968 expedition of the University of London at the 2.0 km (6,500 ft) plateau of the Cave Sandstone (Clarens Formation) north of the eastern arm of Maboloka 28°53′S 27°21′E. No detailed stratigraphy or position of the specimens relative to each other is known. Both specimens were considered closest to Lycorhinus among known heterodontosaurids as they lacked useful overlap with Lanasaurus and Abrictosaurus and showed dental differences from Heterodontosaurus.

Paul Sereno redescribed NHMUK RU A100 in 2012 to correct misidentifications of Thulborn and support a referral of Lanasaurus and all specimens to Lycorhinus. The nasal was reidentified as part of the maxilla, the right mandible had been misidentified as a partial skull, and the left mandible had been misidentified as the right mandible. Both the dental anatomy and curvature of the toothrow could be seen in the type of Lycorhinus as well as NHMUK RU A100 to support their referral to the same taxon. From this, the features considered characteristic of Lanasaurus could also be considered diagnostic of Lycorhinus, and as a result Sereno considered SAM-PK-K3606, BP/1/4244, BP/1/5253, and NHMUK RU A100 all to be specimens of Lycorhinus angustidens. The specimens described by Porro and colleagues were only identified as indeterminate heterodontosaurids.

== Description ==
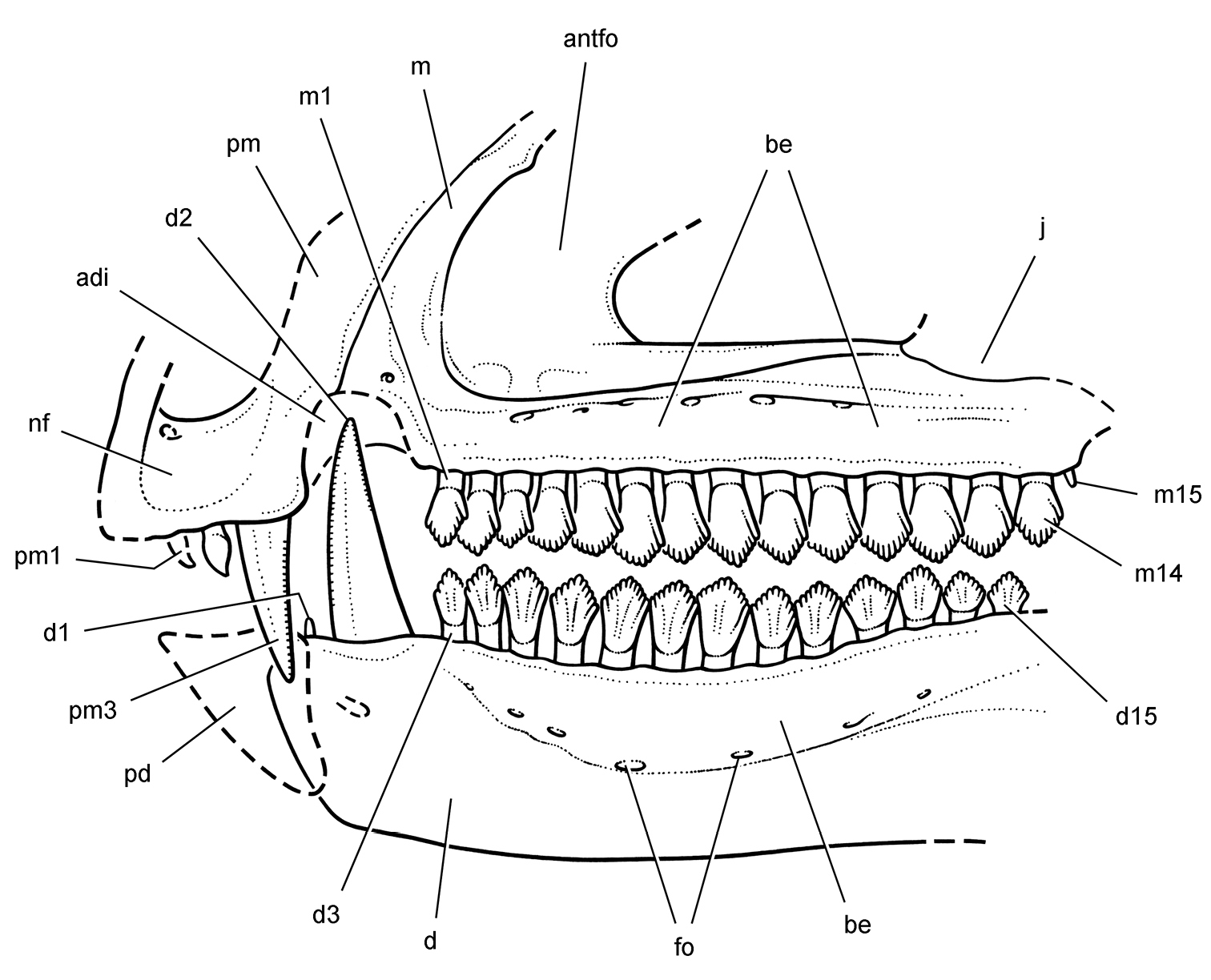
Skull diagram

Lycorhinus, including the remains described by Gow in 1975 as Lanasaurus, is a small (1.2 metres (47 in) in length) herbivorous dinosaur despite the long canines it sported in its jaws.

== Classification ==
Though it was originally named as a cynodont, the ornithischian identity of Lycorhinus has been accepted since it was identified as such by Crompton and Charig in 1962. As one of the earliest ornithischians it was compared in greatest depth to Heterodontosaurus, but treated as distinct from the latter, which was preliminarily placed within Ornithopoda. When independently naming Heterodontosauridae in 1966, Kuhn classified Lycorhinus as an indeterminate early ornithischian, and Romer classified it as a member of the ornithopod family Hypsilophodontidae, both contrasting with the placement of Heterodontosaurus as a heterodontosaurid. The status of Lycorhinus as a relative of Heterodontosaurus was first put forward by Thulborn in 1970 when he established the two genera as synonyms, and referred to them as hypsilophodontids. Thulborn then distinguished Lycorhinus as a "lycorhinid" in 1971, a group of supposedly Triassic hypsilophodontids in contrast to the coexisting "fabrosaurs" that he believed evolved into Jurassic and later hypsilophodontids. The ornithopod classification scheme of Thulborn was disputed by Peter M. Galton the following year, who separated early Hypsilophodontidae into Heterodontosauridae (including Heterodontosaurus, Lycorhinus, and Geranosaurus) and Fabrosauridae (including Fabrosaurus and Echinodon), with fabrosaurids as the earliest-diverging ornithopods, and heterodontosaurids as evolving during the separation of ankylosaurs and stegosaurs from ornithopods. Though the familiar identifications proposed by Galton were maintained by Thulborn, and Charig and Crompton, in 1974, specifics about the relationships of early ornithopods were not always in agreement. Heterodontosaurids have since been classified as early ornithopods, relatives of pachycephalosaurs, relatives of Marginocephalia, or a group of early ornithischians.

Heterodontosaurs were first included in a phylogenetic analysis in the preliminary study of Richard J. Butler in 2005, as part of the redescription of "fabrosaurids" from the Upper Elliot Formation. Heterodontosaurus and Abrictosaurus were united as neornithischians close to the separation of Marginocephalia and Ornithopoda, but other heterodontosaurs were not included. Further revision led to the publication of a revised analysis by Butler and colleagues in 2008 that instead found Heterodontosauridae to be outside all other ornithischians except Pisanosaurus, with Echinodon, Lycorhinus, and NHMUK RU A100 added to the sample found in the 2005 study. An early position for heterodontosaurids would be more consistent with their early stratigraphic age, but further work was considered necessary. An early ornithischian position was also found by phylogenetic analyses carried out in 2011 by Norman and colleagues and in 2012 by Sereno, who focused explicitly on heterodontosaurids. Sereno found that key features of the teeth and jaws supported Lycorhinus as the earliest-diverging member of the Gondwanan clade Heterodontosaurinae, with the Laurasian heterodontosaurs Echinodon, Fruitadens and Tianyulong excluded. Lycorhinus itself was then excluded from a less inclusive group of Pegomastax, Manidens, Abrictosaurus and Heterodontosaurus, as it lacks a large differential in size of its teeth, has a cingulum, and has an immobile predentary. This result is seen below.

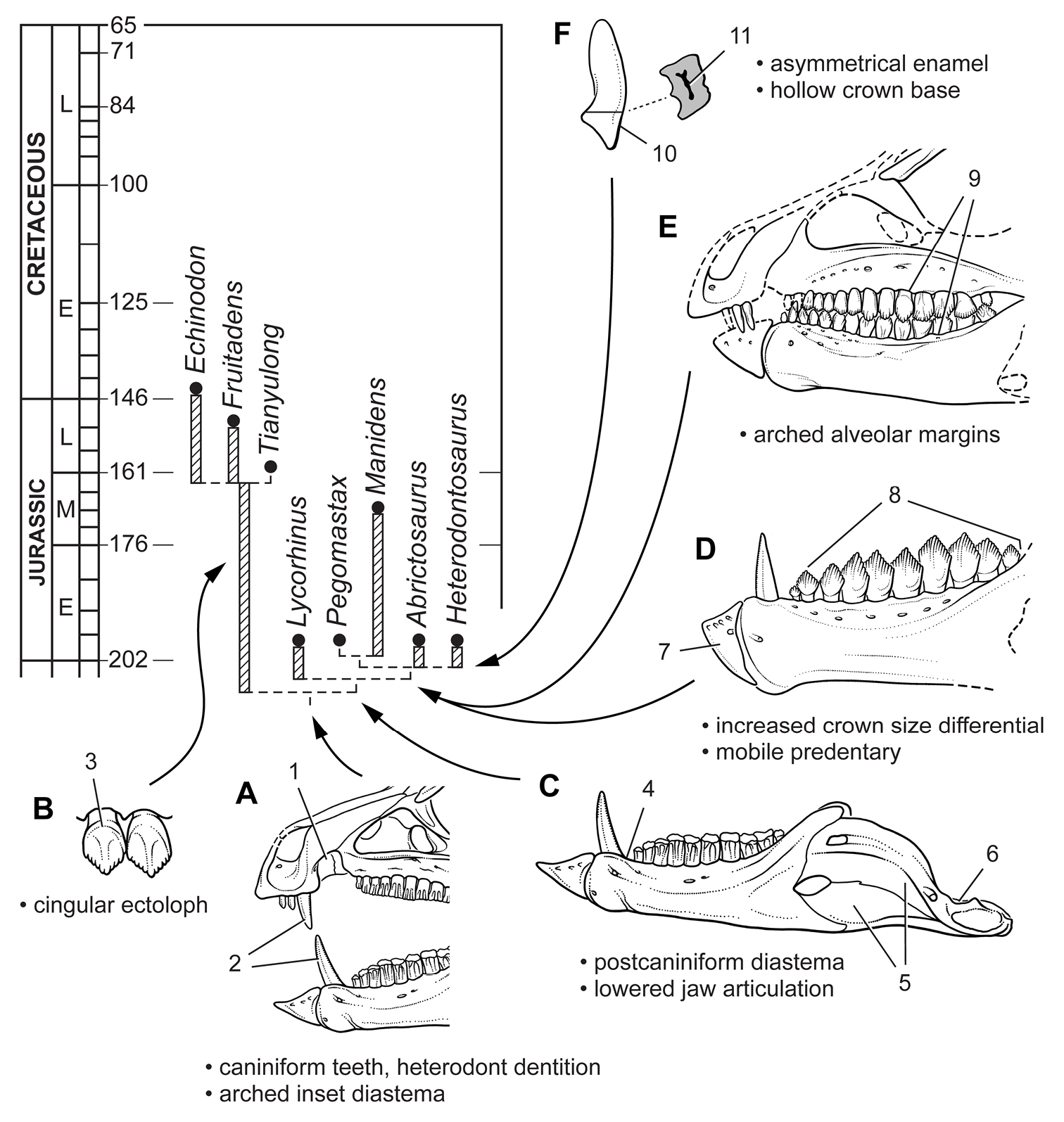
Evolution of key masticatory specializations in heterodontosaurids according to Sereno

- Heterodontosauridae
  - - Echinodon
    - Fruitadens
    - Tianyulong
  - Heterodontosaurinae
    - Lycorhinus
    - - Abrictosaurus
      - Heterodontosaurus
      - - Manidens
        - Pegomastax

In 2017, similarities between the skeletons of Heterodontosaurus and the early theropod Eoraptor were used by Matthew G. Baron and colleagues to suggest that ornithischians should be grouped with theropods in a group called Ornithoscelida. Traditionally, theropods have been grouped with sauropodomorphs in the group Saurischia. In 2020, Paul-Emile Dieudonné and colleagues suggested that members of Heterodontosauridae were basal marginocephalians not forming their own natural group, instead progressively leading to Pachycephalosauria, and were therefore basal members of that group. This hypothesis would reduce the ghost lineage of pachycephalosaurs and pull back the origins of ornithopods back to the Early Jurassic. The subfamily Heterodontosaurinae was considered a valid clade within Pachycephalosauria, containing Heterodontosaurus, Abrictosaurus, and Lycorhinus. The placement of heterodontosaurids as early ornithischians was reaffirmed by the 2024 study of André Fonseca and colleagues, who found Lycorhinus to be a more derived heterodontosaurid than previously recovered, as the sister to Abrictosaurus.

== Paleobiology ==
=== Diet and canine function ===
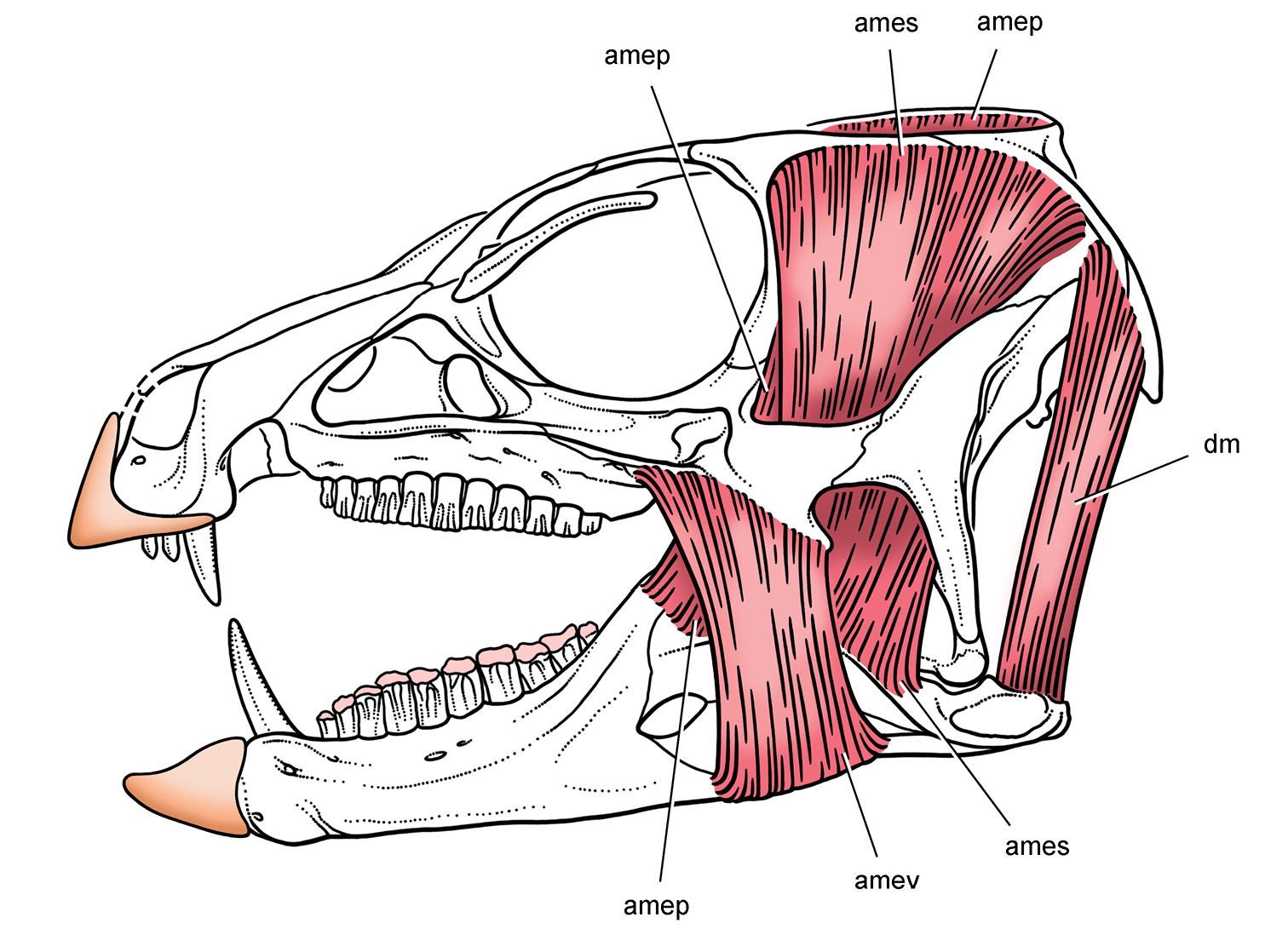
Reconstruction of jaw musculature and keratin sheathing of the beak in Heterodontosaurus

Heterodontosaurids have traditionally been assumed to be herbivorous, alongside all other ornithischians, with the possibilities that the caniniforms were a part of sexual dimorphism based on their absence in Abrictosaurus, which was suggested to be a young or female version of another taxon. Paul Barrett suggested in 2000 that the premaxillary teeth and dentary canine were indications of heterodontosaurids being omnivorous, while Butler and colleagues suggested in 2008 that they were likely used for defense and occasional omnivory, and Porro and colleagues suggested in 2010 that the caniniforms were an indication of a diet of more tough, fibrous vegetation. Norman et al. suggested in 2011 alternatively that the canines were unlikely to have been used for display or cropping and rooting vegetation, as there was no wear from use present and no strong evidence for sexual variation. However, Sereno identified wear facets on the canines of Heterodontosaurus and Lycorhinus. As well, Sereno pointed out that many modern animals have features for display or defense that are identical between sexes, so the use of canines for either could not be ruled out. Sereno considered the canines of heterodontosaurids to be most similar to those of peccaries in form, and suggested that their diet of fruits, roots, grass, acorns, pine nuts and thistles may represent the closest living comparison to heterodontosaurids. A predominantly or exclusively herbivorous diet in Lycorhinus could be directly supported by the extensive tooth-to-tooth wear facets it has, which show that it possessed the same adaptations for propalinal (forwards and backwards) jaw movement and processing plant material as other ornithischians.

=== Ecology ===
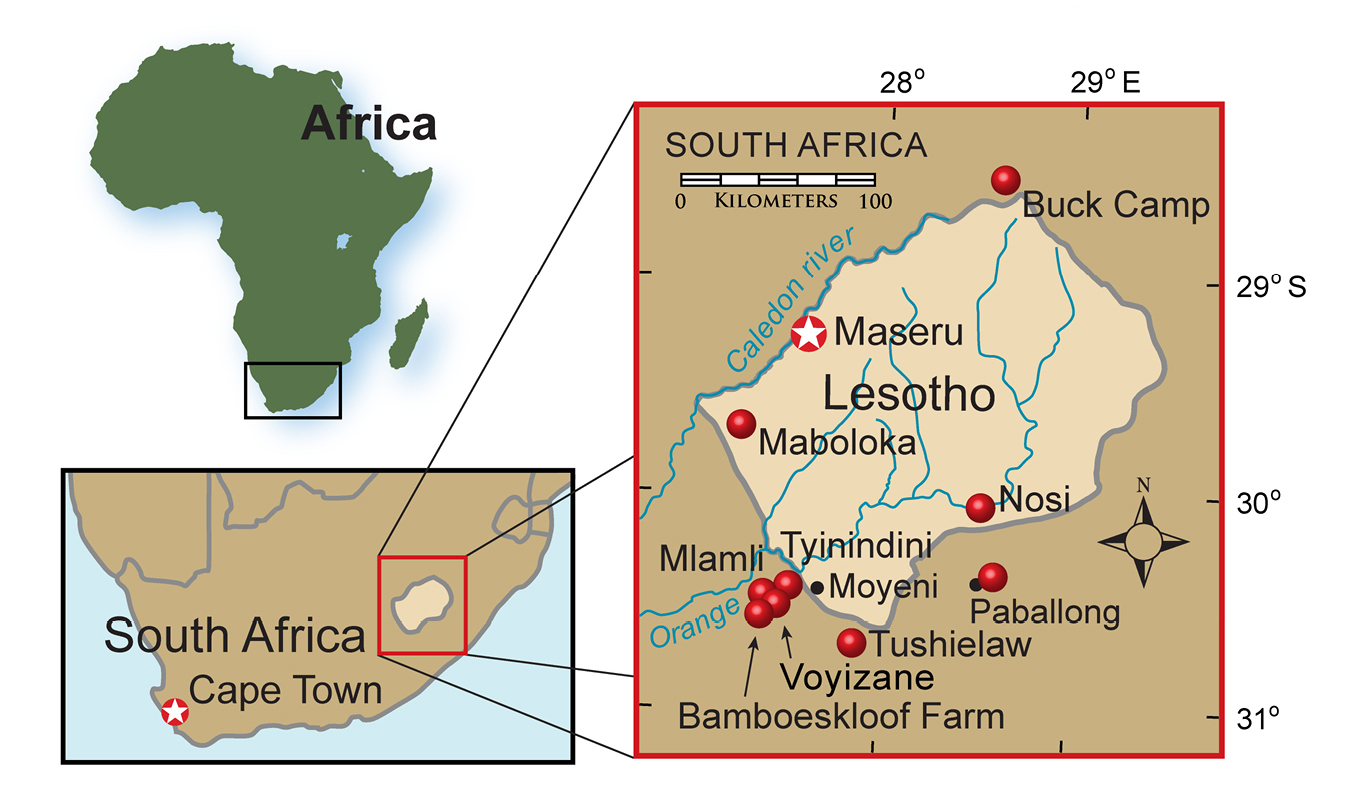
Map of heterodontosaurid localities in South Africa and Lesotho, Lycorhinus is known from Paballong and possibly Buck Camp, Bamboeskloof Farm, and Maboloka

Lycorhinus is known from specimens found in the Upper Elliot Formation of the Stormberg Group of the southern African Karoo Basin. The Elliot Formation spans the Triassic–Jurassic boundary, with the lower Elliot being mid-Norian to Rhaetian, and the upper Elliot being Hettangian to Sinemurian; 201.3 to 190.8 million years ago. The upper Elliot Formation consists of red to pink fluvial and aeolian mudstones that are rich in organic matter, including all ornithischians yet found in the Elliot Formation. The Upper Elliot Formation is characterised by animals that appear to be more lightly built than those of the Lower Elliot Formation, which may have been an adaptation to the drier climate at this time in southern Africa. Most of the upper Elliot Formation is part of the "Massospondylus Assemblage Zone", the oldest dinosaur-dominated biozone in Gondwana, characterized by the appearance of abundant sauropodomorph Massospondylus fossils as the main index taxon, as well as the co-occurring ornithischian Lesothosaurus and crocodylomorph Protosuchus.

Within the upper Elliot Formation and younger Clarens Formation, sauropodomorphs are the most abundant dinosaur group and make up 58.7% of discovered vertebrate taxa, followed by ornithischians at 5.9%, and theropods at 2% of the abundance. Most of the named sauropodomorphs have been found in the middle of the upper Elliot Formation and thus older than Lycorhinus, including Aardonyx, Antetonitrus, Arcusaurus, Ignavusaurus, Ledumahadi, Massospondylus and Pulanesaura, though Massospondylus is throughout the formation. The position of the individual heterodontosaurid specimens within the rock succession is poorly known, making it difficult to determine how many of these species really were coeval, and which species existed at separate times. However, estimations for age of uncertain discoveries suggests that Lycorhinus was equivalent in age to Heterodontosaurus and possibly Abrictosaurus, as well as the index taxon Lesothosaurus that can be found throughout the entire upper Elliot Formation. Only the theropods Megapnosaurus and Dracovenator are known from the upper Elliot Formation, the former likely lived at the same time as Lycorhinus.

Among non-dinosaur taxa, members of Eucynodontia are the most common in the upper Elliot formation, with both Diarthrognathus and Pachygenelus coexisting with Lycorhinus. Other synapsids are far less common, but Tritylodon and Megazostrodon are both known from the middle of the deposits. Protosuchus and Orthosuchus represent the only crocodylomorphs that definitively lived alongside Lycorhinus, with Litargosuchus probably older and Sphenosuchus possibly younger. Australochelys is the only turtle known from the Elliot Formation, and it may be older than Lycorhinus but both are of uncertain provenance. Unnamed amphibians from the family Chigutisauridae may have been older than Lycorhinus, as well as intermediate fish species of the genus Ceratodus. Other fishes and the sphenodontian Clevosaurus are also known from the upper Elliot. Some invertebrates are known from the Massospondylus Assemblage Zone, including the crustacean Lepidurus, the beetle Coleopterus, the wood cockroach Phthartus, orthopteran Striatotegmen, the cricket Archaegryllodes, and intermediate brachiopods and crustaceans. Plants are represented by the horsetails Equisetum and Equisetites, the cycadeoid Otozamites, the conifers Sphenolepidiurn and Pinus, the seed ferns Phoenicopsis and Dicroidium, algal mat Spirogyra, and fossil wood and pollen of Agathoxylon, Podocarpoxylon, Araucarioxylon, Lacrimasporonites, Uvaesporites and Cyathidites.
