= Todd Marshall (artist) =

Paleoartist and illustrator

- Known for: Paleoart and concept art
- Website: marshalls-art.com

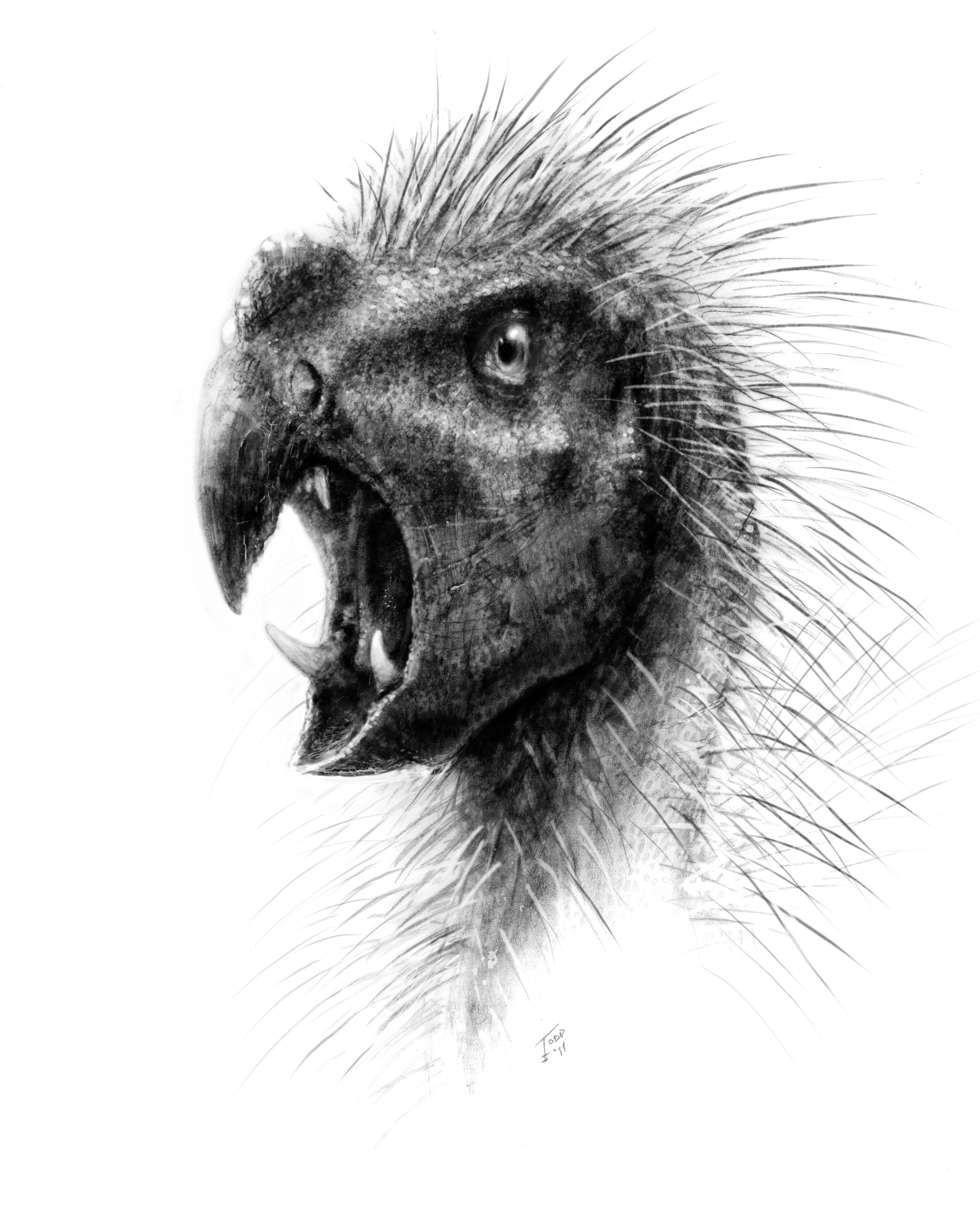
Life restoration of the dinosaur Pegomastax africana, by Todd Marshall

Todd S. Marshall is an American illustrator and paleoartist specializing in reconstructions of prehistoric animals, particularly dinosaurs, as well as concept art for video game companies and films. Marshall's original dinosaur art has been featured in natural history museums, scientific papers and children's books.

In Los Angeles in the early 1980s he painted album covers for heavy metal bands including Mötley Crüe, W.A.S.P., and L.A. Guns. His interest in and production of concept art began under the mentorship of character designer Mark "Crash" McCreery, and Marshall later became well-known as a paleoartist by working on a number of new dinosaur discoveries and press releases with paleontologist Paul Sereno at the University of Chicago. He is based in Boise, Idaho.

In interview with Steve White, Marshall describes his introduction to the art of dinosaur reconstruction through the 1966 film One Million Years B.C., which inspired his first attempt at paleoart (a Brontosaurus) at age four or five. Originally from Kansas, he moved to Los Angeles to pursue his dream of becoming a rock star, and later decided that it would be more lucrative and consistent with his talents to become an illustrator. He attended the Art Center College of Design in Pasadena, California, where he met "Crash" McCreery, who Marshall cites as a chief influence along with music stars such as Elvis Presley, special effects artists such as Ray Harryhausen, movie producers and directors including George Lucas and Steven Spielberg, and classic paleoartists such as Charles R. Knight. As a professional paleoartist, Marshall prefers to work in acrylic paints and particularly enjoys the use of airbrushes.
