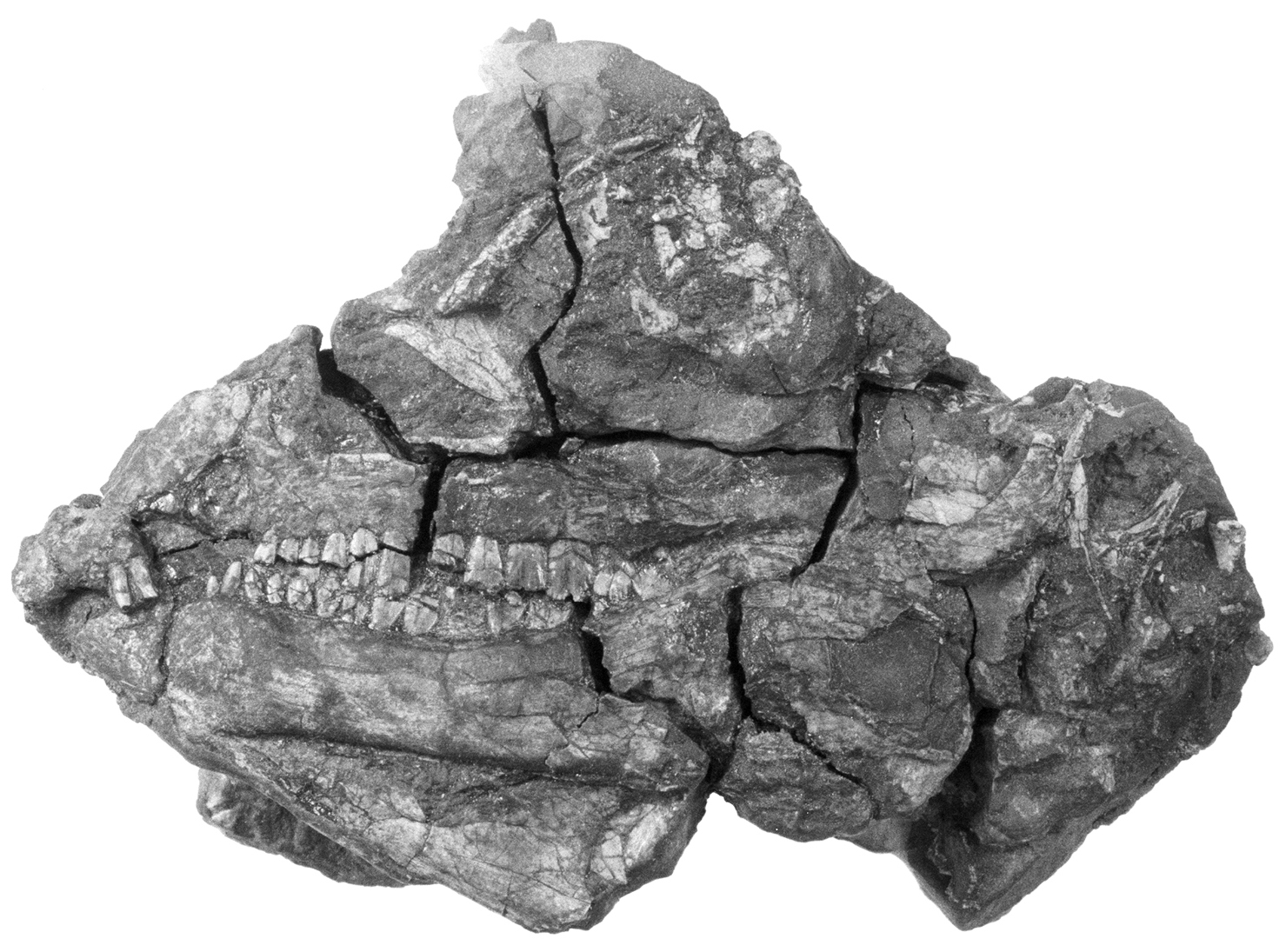
- Holotype specimen (NHMUK PV RUB 54)

Scientific classification
- Kingdom: Animalia
- Phylum: Chordata
- Class: Reptilia
- Clade: Dinosauria
- Clade: †Ornithischia
- Family: †Heterodontosauridae
- Subfamily: †Heterodontosaurinae
- Genus: †Abrictosaurus; Hopson, 1975

Species
- †A. consors (Thulborn, 1974) [originally Lycorhinus consors] (type)

= Abrictosaurus =

Abrictosaurus Temporal range: Early Jurassic, 199–196 Ma

Extinct genus of dinosaur from the early Jurassic of southern Africa

Abrictosaurus (/əˌbrɪktəˈsɔːrəs/; "wakeful lizard") is a genus of heterodontosaurid dinosaur that lived during the Early Jurassic in what is now in parts of southern Africa such as Lesotho and South Africa. It was a bipedal herbivore or omnivore and was one of the most basal heterodontosaurids. It was approximately 1.2 metres (3.9 ft) long and weighed less than 45 kilograms (99 lb).

This dinosaur is known from the fossil remains of only two individuals, found in the Upper Elliot Formation of Qacha's Nek District in Lesotho and Cape Province in South Africa. The Upper Elliot is thought to date from the Hettangian and Sinemurian stages of the Early Jurassic Period, approximately 200 to 190 million years ago. This formation is thought to preserve sand dunes as well as seasonal floodplains, in a semiarid environment with sporadic rainfall. Other dinosaurs found in this formation include the theropod Megapnosaurus, the sauropodomorph Massospondylus, as well as other heterodontosaurids like Heterodontosaurus and Lycorhinus. Remains of terrestrial crocodylomorphs, cynodonts and early mammals are also abundant.

== Description ==
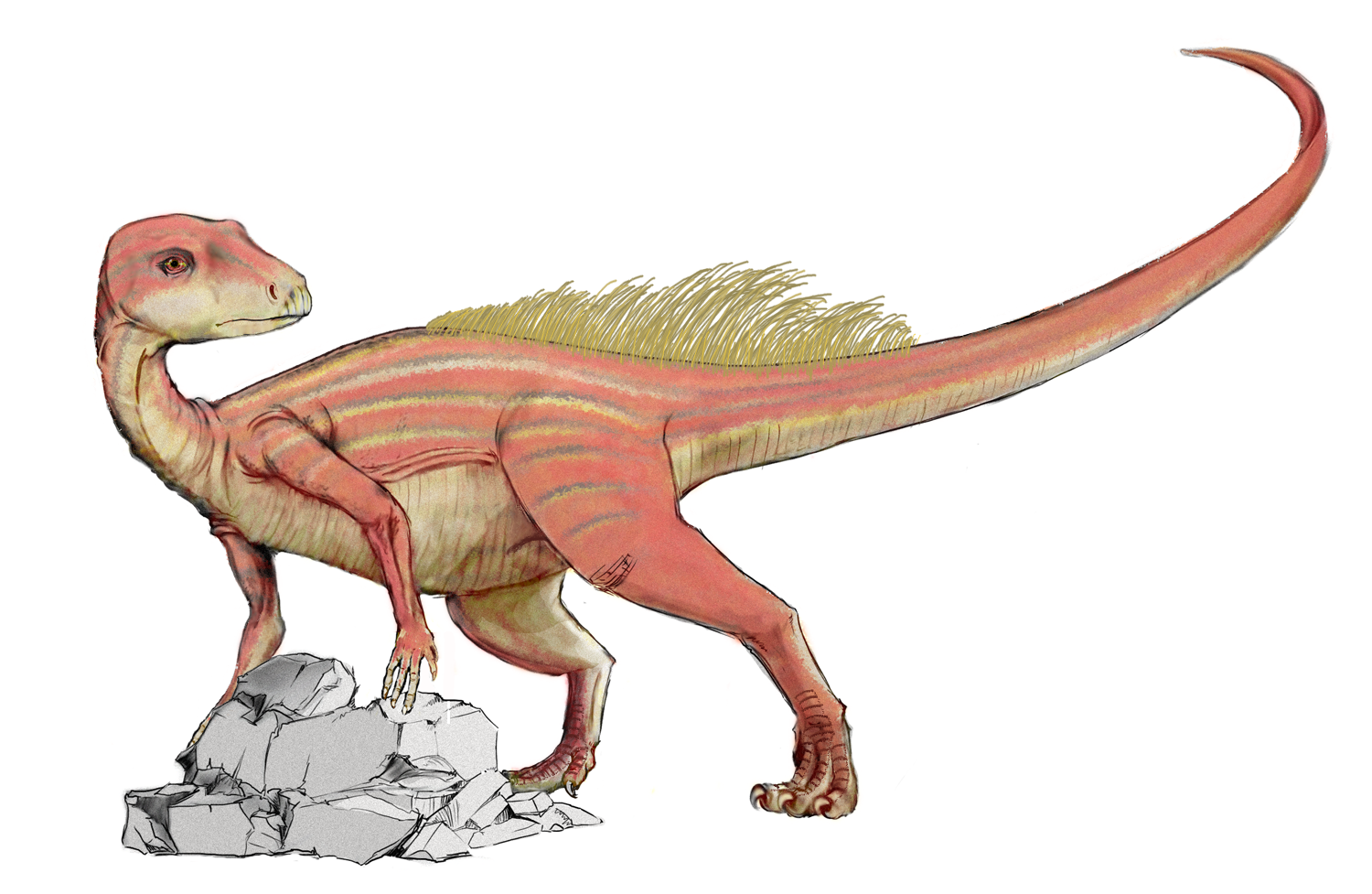
Illustration of Abrictosaurus

Heterodontosaurids like Abrictosaurus were small, early ornithischians, named for their markedly heterodont dentition. They are best known for the large, canine-like tusks (often called caniniforms) in both upper and lower jaws. There were no teeth in the front of the jaws, where a hard beak was used to crop vegetation. There were three premaxillary teeth, with the first two small and conical and the third enlarged to form the upper caniniform, counterpart to the even larger lower caniniform, which was the first dentary tooth. In the upper jaw, a large gap (or diastema) accommodated the lower caniniform tooth and separated the premaxillary teeth from the wider chewing teeth of the maxilla. Similar teeth lined the remainder of the lower jaw.

Abrictosaurus is usually considered the most basal member of the family Heterodontosauridae. Lycorhinus and Heterodontosaurus both had high-crowned cheek teeth, which overlapped each other in the jaw, forming a continuous chewing surface analogous to those of Cretaceous hadrosaurids. Abrictosaurus had more widely separated cheek teeth, with lower crowns, more similar to other early ornithischians. It has been suggested that Abrictosaurus lacked tusks and that this is another primitive feature. However, caniniforms were clearly present on one of the two specimens of Abrictosaurus. The upper caniniform measured 10.5 millimeters (0.4 inches) high, while the lower reached 17 mm (0.67 in). These caniniforms were serrated only on the anterior surface, unlike those of Lycorhinus and Heterodontosaurus, which were serrated on both anterior and posterior edges. Abrictosaurus also had smaller, less powerful forelimbs than Heterodontosaurus and one fewer phalanx bone in both the fourth and fifth digits of the forelimb.

== History and naming ==
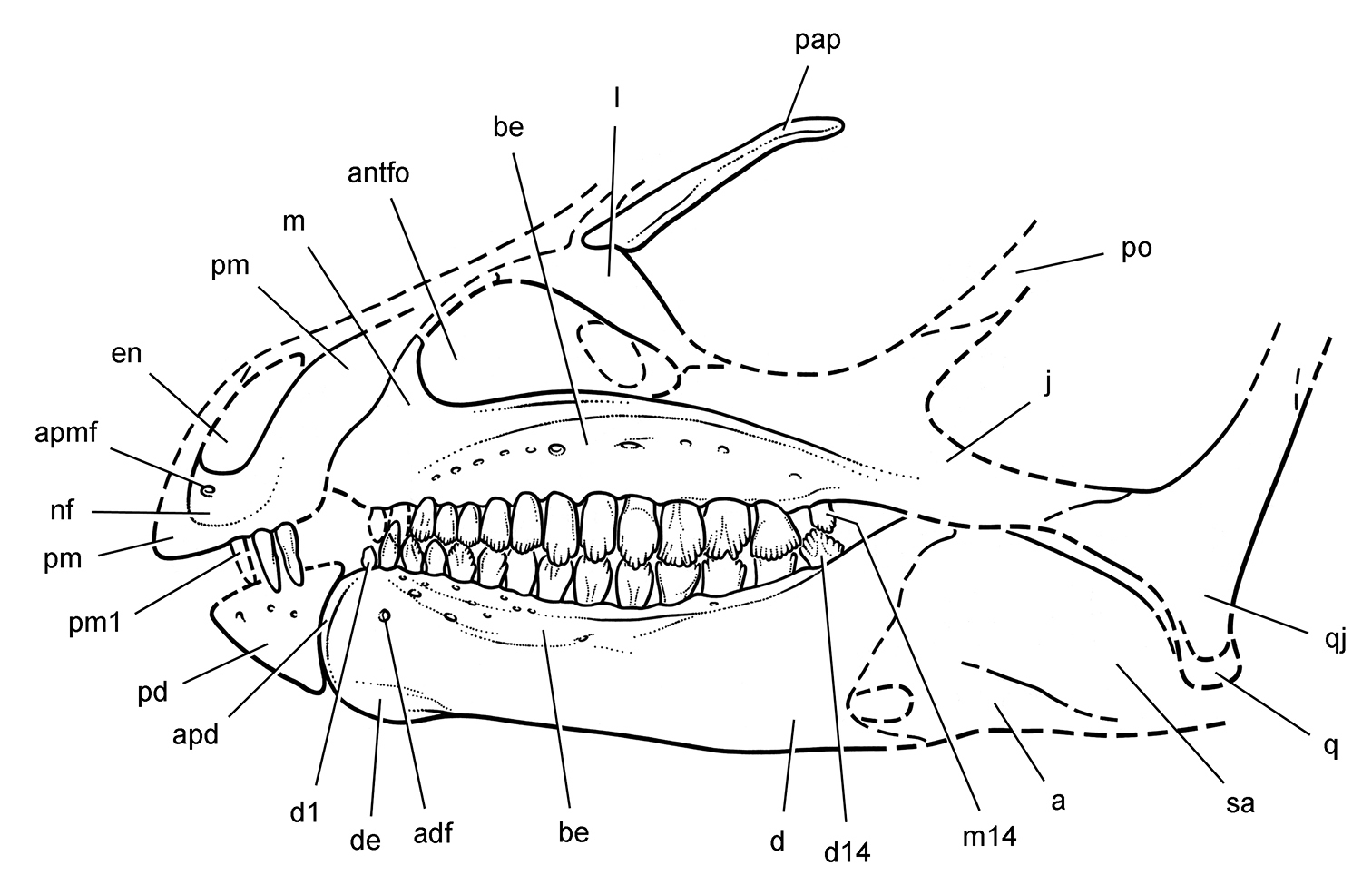
Skull diagram

Both specimens of Abrictosaurus were housed in the collection of University College London until they were transferred to the Natural History Museum, London, in 1986. The holotype specimen, previously UCL B54 and now NHMUK PV RUB 54, was discovered in Lesotho and comprises a partial skull and skeleton. Paleontologist Richard Thulborn, who first described the specimen in 1974, considered it a new species of Lycorhinus and named it L. consors, using the Latin word consors which means 'companion' or 'spouse'. As NHMUK PV RUB 54 lacked the caniniforms which had been found in the type species, Lycorhinus angustidens, Thulborn believed it to be female. Neither the skull nor the skeletons of Abrictosaurus have been fully described in the literature. A tooth from the latest Triassic of Switzerland has been assigned to Abrictosaurus sp., but this has not been supported, as the specimen does not have unique characteristics of Abrictosaurus, heterodontosaurids, or ornithischians in general.

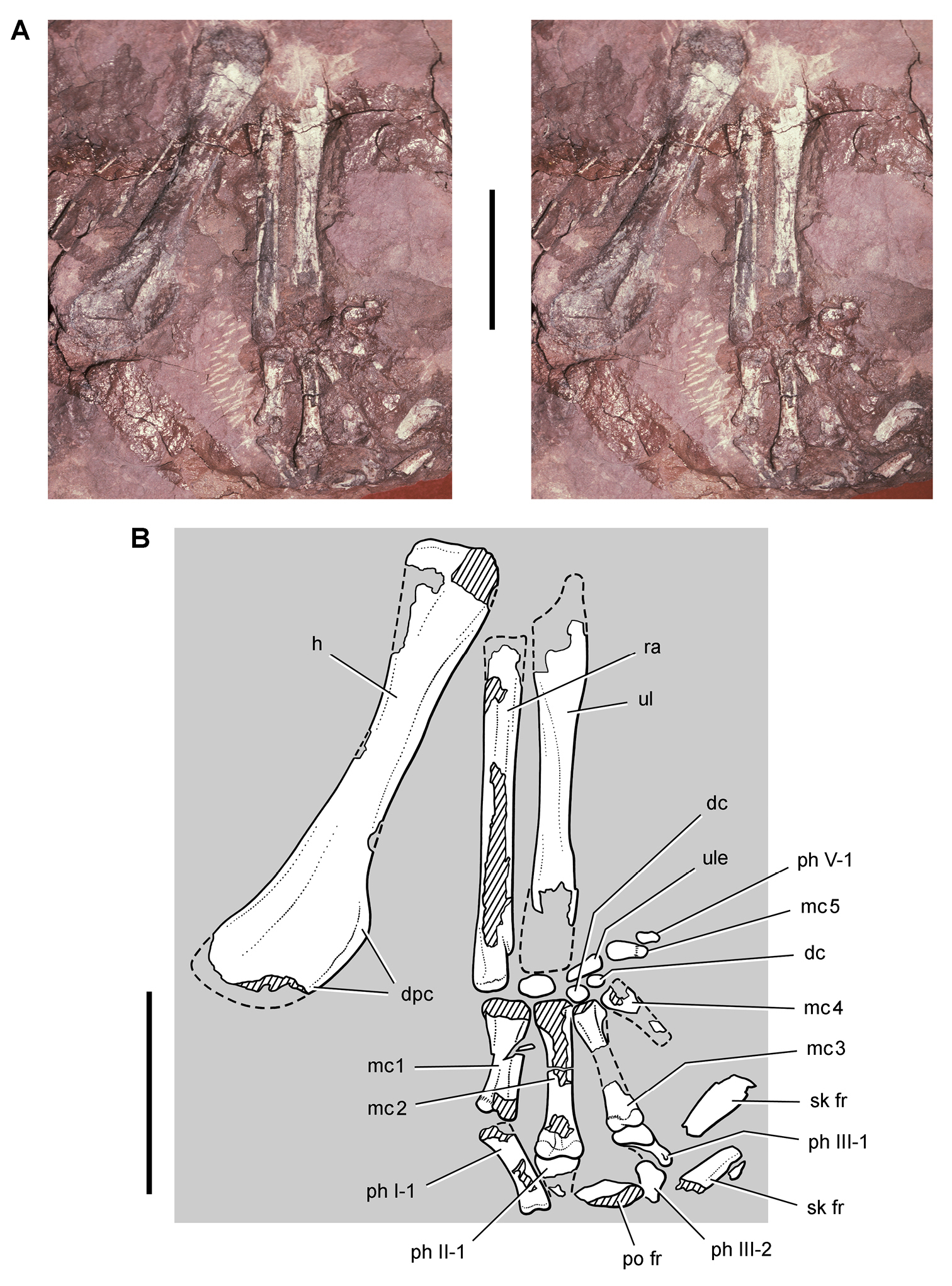
Forelimb and diagram

In 1975, James Hopson redescribed a fragmentary heterodontosaur skull (formerly UCL A100, now NHMUK PV RUA 100) found in South Africa that Thulborn had previously assigned to Lycorhinus angustidens. After showing that NHMUK PV RUA 100 could not belong to L. angustidens but was instead more similar to NHMUK PV RUB 54, Hopson erected a new genus to contain both specimens. The generic name Abrictosaurus (from the Greek αβρικτος (abriktos) meaning 'wakeful' and σαυρος (sauros) meaning 'lizard') refers to Hopson's disagreement with Thulborn's hypothesis that heterodontosaurids underwent periods of aestivation (hibernation during hot and/or dry seasons). The specific name was retained, creating the new binomial Abrictosaurus consors. Despite Hopson's renaming, Thulborn continued to consider Lycorhinus angustidens, Heterodontosaurus tucki, and Abrictosaurus consors to be three species of the genus Lycorhinus. Most paleontologists maintain all three genera separately, although there is no precise definition of a species or genus in paleontology.

== Sexual dimorphism ==
The hypothesis of sexual dimorphism in heterodontosaurids has long centered on Abrictosaurus. Tusks are a sexually dimorphic trait in many modern mammals, including musk deer, walrus, Asian elephants and many pigs, with tusks being present primarily in males. The lack of tusks in NHMUK PV RUB 54 led to suggestions that it was female; perhaps even a female of another species. The discovery of caniniforms in NHMUK PV RUA 100 showed that A. consors also has this 'male' characteristic, suggesting that it is at least a valid species in its own right. However, NHMUK PV RUB 54 may actually be a juvenile, based on its short face and unfused sacral (hip) vertebrae. Therefore, the lack of tusks could be a juvenile trait instead of a secondary sexual characteristic, weakening the case for sexual dimorphism.
