= Elliot Formation =

Lithostratigraphic layer of the Stormberg Group in South Africa

- Stratigraphic range: Norian-Pliensbachian; ~220–190 Ma
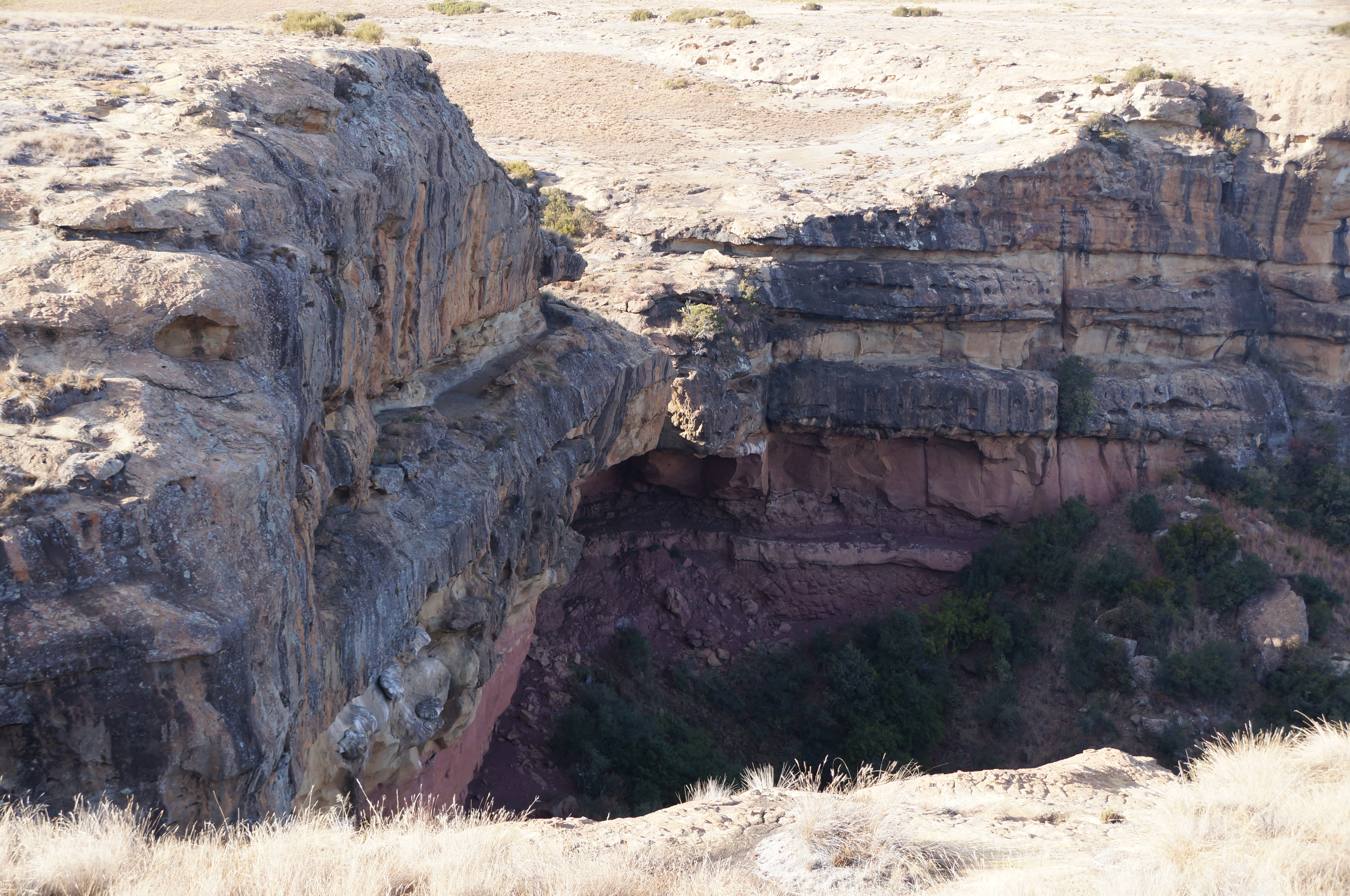
- Elliot Formation caves in the Matalane Valley, Leribe, Lesotho
- Type: Geological formation
- Unit of: Stormberg Group
- Sub-units: Upper Elliot, Lower Elliot
- Underlies: Clarens Formation
- Overlies: Molteno Formation
- Thickness: up to 500 m (1,600 ft)

Lithology
- Primary: Mudstone, sandstone
- Other: Siltstone, conglomerate

Location
- Coordinates: 30.5°S 27.4°E
- Approximate paleocoordinates: 44.1°S 1.9°W
- Region: Eastern Cape, Free State, Mafeteng, Maseru, Quthing, Qacha's Nek & Mohale's Hoek
- Country: Lesotho; South Africa

Type section
- Named for: Elliot, Eastern Cape
- Elliot Formation (Lesotho)

The Elliot Formation is a geological formation and forms part of the Stormberg Group, the uppermost geological group that comprises the greater Karoo Supergroup. Outcrops of the Elliot Formation have been found in the northern Eastern Cape, southern Free State, and in the eastern KwaZulu-Natal provinces of South Africa. Outcrops and exposures are also found in several localities in Lesotho such as Qacha's Neck, Hill Top, Quthing, and near the capital, Maseru. The Elliot Formation is further divided into the lower (LEF) and upper (UEF) Elliot formations to differentiate significant sedimentological differences between these layers. The LEF is mainly Late Triassic (Norian-Rhaetian) in age while the UEF is mainly Early Jurassic (Hettangian-earliest Pliensbachian) and is tentatively regarded to preserve a continental record of the Triassic-Jurassic boundary in southern Africa. This geological formation is named after the town of Elliot in the Eastern Cape, and its stratotype locality is located on the Barkly Pass, 9 km north of the town.

== Geology ==
The Elliot Formation unconformably overlies the Molteno Formation and is conformably overlain by the Clarens Formation. Due to the reddish colour of the rocks, the Elliot Formation is colloquially referred to as the "Red Beds" in older geologic literature.

The Elliot Formation is dominated by mudstones and siltstones that can be finely laminated. However, the internal structures in the mudstones are often not visible due to locally poor laminations. Calcareous nodules are also found in the mudstone layers and become more frequent up section into the UEF. The mudstones range in colour from greyish purple red in the LEF and turn a more brick red colour with more mature palaeosols in the UEF. Localized intraformational pebble conglomerates that comprise intrabasinal clasts that comprise mud chips, quartzite pebbles, pedogenic nodules, and fossil bone fragments only occur in the UEF. The lower and upper Elliot formations both contain sandstones but they vary in their internal geometries. The sandstones of the LEF mainly comprise laterally accreting channel deposits that are multi-story and contain trough, low angle, and planar, cross-bedding. Ripple cross laminations with good horizontal lamination are also present. In the UEF, sandstone beds are single story and mainly reflect downstream accretion channel geometries and are more tabular in appearance. Common internal sedimentary structures of UEF sandstones are planar, low angle cross-bedding, horizontal and ripple-cross laminations.

The LEF was deposited in a fluvio-lacustrine environment where rivers were more perennial and formed meandering channel geometries, as evidenced by the presence of lateral accretion. However, this depositional environment changed at the onset of the UEF deposits where evidence of shallower river channels, longer periods of floodplain stasis (mature palaeosols) and flash flood events (pedogenic nodule conglomerates) shows that the climate became more arid.

=== Correlation ===
The Elliot Formation is currently considered to correlate chronostratigraphically with geological formations of the Bodibeng Sandstone of the Tuli Basin in Botswana, the Omingonde Formation of the Etjo Basin in Namibia, and the Chinle Formation of the Colorado Plateau in Utah, United States.

=== Age ===
U-Pb radiometric dating using zircon grains has refined the duration of the Elliot Formation. Zircons of the Lower Elliot Formation are entirely Late Triassic, ranging from around 220 to 205 million years old (Norian to Rhaetian stages). Zircons of the Upper Elliot are mostly Early Jurassic, ranging from around 202 to 192 million years old (latest Rhaetian to Sinemurian stages). The oldest zircons of the overlying Clarens Formation are about 187 million years old (mid-Pliensbachian stage).

The entire Elliot Formation also preserves a record of magnetostratigraphy, with at least nine reverse-normal polarity chron pairs (EF1r to EF9n). The lower-upper Elliot boundary is in the middle of chron EF6n. The Elliot Formation's magnetostratigraphy can be partially correlated with similar records in the Newark Basin (northeast United States), Chinle and Moenave formations (southwest United States), and Los Colorados Formation (Argentina).

== Paleontology ==
The Elliot Formation is well known for its diverse fossils of dinosaur and other vertebrates. The formation is divided into two biozones, the Scalenodontoides Assemblage Zone and Massospondylus Assemblage Zone. The Scalenodontoides Assemblage Zone corresponds to the Lower Elliot Formation. Formerly known as the 'Euskelosaurus' Range Zone, its index taxa include the cynodont Scalenodontoides and the sauropodomorphs Blikanasaurus and Melanorosaurus. The Massospondylus Assemblage Zone extends from the Upper Elliot Formation into the Clarens Formation. Its index taxa include the sauropodomorph Massospondylus, the ornithischian Lesothosaurus, and the crocodylomorph Protosuchus.

Sauropodomorphs are particularly diverse in the Elliot Formation. The most common dinosaur is a sauropodomorph species, Massospondylus carinatus. Fossilised Massospondylus eggs, some with the fossilized remains of embryos intact, have been recovered from UEF deposits in the Golden Gate Highlands National Park.

The mudstones of the LEF sometimes yield petrified wood, fossil plant matter, crustaceans, fishes, and turtles while the sandstones of the upper Elliot Formation more often contain various trace fossils. These include vertebrate trackways of basal ornithischian dinosaurs found in the Leribe, Mafeteng, and Mohales Hoek Districts of Lesotho. Possible trackways of the dicynodont Pentasaurus have been found on Morobong Hill in the Mohales Hoek District of Lesotho.

== Paleofauna ==
=== Dinosaurs ===
Color key: Taxon / Reclassified taxon / Taxon falsely reported as present / Dubious taxon or junior synonym / Ichnotaxon / Ootaxon / Morphotaxon

Notes
Uncertain or tentative taxa are in small text
~~crossed out~~ taxa are discredited.

==== Ornithischians ====
Ornithischians of the Elliot Formation
Genus / Taxon	Species	Location	Stratigraphy	Assemblage Zone	Materials	Notes	Images
Abrictosaurus	A. consors	Qacha's Nek, Lesotho	Upper Elliot	Massospondylus	Several specimens consist of a partial skull and partial skeleton	A heterodontosaurid, formerly species of Lycorhinus	
Eocursor	E. parvus	Free State, South Africa	Upper Elliot	Massospondylus	A partial skeleton consists of skull portions, lower jaw, vertebrae, and limbs	A basal ornithischian	
Fabrosaurus	F. australis	Likhoele, Lesotho	Upper Elliot	Massospondylus	Partial jaw and dentary	A basal ornithischian, nomen dubium	
Heterodontosaurus	H. tucki	Tushielaw Farm, Tyindini, and Krommespruit of South Africa	Upper Elliot	Massospondylus	Multiple specimens	A heterodontosaurid	
Lesothosaurus	L. diagnosticus	Multiple localities found in Lesotho and South Africa	Upper Elliot	Massospondylus	A partial skull	A basal neornithischian or thyreophoran, formerly considered a species of Fabrosaurus. Larger Lesothosaurus specimens are sometimes given the name Stormbergia.	
Lycorhinus	L. angustidens	Paballong and Buck Camp of South Africa	Upper Elliot	Massospondylus	Specimens consist of mandibles and dentaries.	A heterodontosaurid	
Moyenisauropus	M. sp.	Moyeni Tracksite, South Africa	Upper Elliot	Massospondylus	Multiple Footprints	Large ornithischian footprints similar to Anomoepus.	
Pegomastax	P. africana	Krommespruit, Voisana	Upper Elliot	Massospondylus	A partial skull	A heterodontosaurid	
Thyreophora	indet.		Upper Elliot	Massospondylus	Scute specimen	Known from scutes	
Trisauropodiscus	T. aviforma	Maphutseng II tracksite, Lesotho	Lower–Upper Elliot	Massospondylus	Footprints	Very small bird-like dinosaur footprints, potentially produced by theropods or heterodontosaurid ornithischians.	

==== Sauropodomorphs ====
Prosauropods of the Elliot Formation
Genus	Species	Location	Stratigraphy	Assemblage Zone	Materials	Notes	Images
Aardonyx	A. celestae	Marc's Quarry bone bed	Upper Elliot	Massospondylus	A partial skeleton consists of cranial elements, vertebrae, dorsal and cervical ribs, gastralia, chevrons, elements of the pectoral and pelvic girdles, and several limb bones.	A derived sauropodomorph	
Antetonitrus	A. ingenipes	Welbedacht/Edelweiss	Upper Elliot	Massospondylus	A partial skeleton	A lessemsaurid, either a derived sauropodomorph or basal sauropod.	
Arcusaurus	A. pereirabdalorum	Spion Kop Heelbo	Upper Elliot	Massospondylus	A partial skull	A basal sauropodomorph, known from juveniles	
Blikanasaurus	B. cromptoni	Blikana Mountain	Lower Elliot	Scalenodontoides	A partial hindlimb	A derived sauropodomorph or basal sauropod.	
Eucnemesaurus	E. entaxonis	Cannon Rock Farm	Lower Elliot	Scalenodontoides	A set of postcrania consists of the posteriormost dorsal vertebrae, sacrum, anterior caudal vertebrae, pelvis, and hindlimb	A possible riojasaurid	
Eucnemesaurus	E. fortis	Sonderhout	Lower Elliot	Scalenodontoides	A partial skeleton	A possible riojasaurid	
Euskelosaurus	E. browni		Lower Elliot	Scalenodontoides		A plateosaurid, potentially dubious	
Gryponyx	G. africanus		Upper Elliot	Massospondylus		A massospondylid, potentially dubious	
Ignavusaurus	I. rachelis		Upper Elliot	Massospondylus		A massospondylid, known from a juvenile. A potential synonym of Massospondylus	
Kholumolumo	K. ellenbergerorum	Thotobolo ea 'Ma-beata	Lower Elliot	Scalenodontoides	A limb bone consisted of a right tibia	A basal massopodan.	
Ledumahadi	L. mafube		Upper Elliot	Massospondylus		A lessemsaurid, either a derived sauropodomorph or basal sauropod. The largest dinosaur in the formation.	
Massospondylus	M. carinatus		Upper Elliot	Massospondylus		A massospondylid, the most common dinosaur in the formation.	
Massospondylus	M. kaalae		Upper Elliot	Massospondylus		A massospondylid which differs from M. carinatus in cranial features	
Melanorosaurus	M. readi	Thaba 'Nyama	Lower Elliot	Scalenodontoides		A derived sauropodomorph	
Meroktenos	M. thabanensis	Thabana Morena	Lower Elliot	Scalenodontoides	A thighbone or femur and other assorted bones	A derived sauropodomorph, formerly a species of Melanorosaurus	
Nyana	N. rooiwalensis	Qhemegha	Lower Elliot	Scalenodontoides	An articulated skull and partial postcranial skeleton of a juvenile individual	A massopodan sauropodomorph with possible affinities to the Massospondylidae.	
Plateosauravus	P. cullingworthi	Kromme Spruit	Lower Elliot	Scalenodontoides	A partial skeleton	A basal sauropodomorph, formerly specimens of Euskelosaurus	
Pseudotetrasauropus	P. bipedoida		Lower Elliot	Scalenodontoides		Large bipedal sauropodomorph footprints.	
Pseudotetrasauropus	P. jaquesi		Lower Elliot	Scalenodontoides	Footprints	Large quadrupedal sauropodomorph footprints, sometimes considered a species of Lavinipes.	
Pulanesaura	P. eocollum	Sauropod Quarry	Upper Elliot	Massospondylus	Several materials consist of two isolated teeth, a middle cervical vertebra, five back vertebral arches, a single right dorsal rib, three tail vertebrae, a left clavicle, a distal right humerus, a left ulna, possibly the fourth right middle hand bone, three ischia, a left and a right shinbone, and two hindlimb first claws.	A derived sauropodomorph or basal sauropod	
Sefapanosaurus	S. zastronensis	Zastron	Lower Elliot?	Scalenodontoides	A set of limb elements consists of an incomplete, articulated left pes	A derived sauropodomorph	
Tetrasauropus	T. unguiferus		Lower Elliot	Scalenodontoides		Large quadrupedal sauropodomorph footprints.	

==== Theropods ====
Large theropod-like teeth have been found in the Lower Elliot Formation. Various exposures of the formation (primarily in Lesotho) preserve informative interactions between theropod trackmakers and soft sediment.

Theropods of the Elliot Formation
Genus	Species	Location	Stratigraphy	Assemblage Zone	Materials	Notes	Images
Dracovenator	D. regenti	Upper Drumbo Farm	Upper Elliot	Massospondylus	A partial skull	A large neotheropod, potentially close to Dilophosaurus.	
Eubrontes	E. sp.		Lower–Upper Elliot	Scalenodontoides—Massospondylus	Footprints	Large theropod footprints.	
Grallator	G. sp.		Lower–Upper Elliot	Scalenodontoides—Massospondylus	Footprints	Small theropod footprints.	
Kayentapus	K. ambrokholohali		Upper Elliot	Massospondylus	Footprints	Very large theropod footprints. The largest prints, measuring 57 cm (22 in) in length, may belong to a theropod up to 9 m (30 ft) long.	
Megapnosaurus	M. rhodesiensis	Syntarsus site	Upper Elliot	Massospondylus	A well-preserved postcranial skeleton, missing only the skull and cervical vertebrae	A coelophysid, also known as Syntarsus.	

=== Pseudosuchians ===
Pseudosuchians of the Elliot Formation
Genus / Taxon	Species	Location	Stratigraphy	Assemblage Zone	Materials	Notes	Images
Basutodon	B. ferox		Lower Elliot	Scalenodontoides		A dubious archosaur based on a "rauisuchian"-like tooth.	
Batrachopus			Upper Elliot	Massospondylus		Small crocodylomorph footprints.	
Brachychirotherium	B. cf. thuringiacum		Lower Elliot	Scalenodontoides		Large "chirothere" footprints.	
Litargosuchus	L. leptorhynchus	Eagles Crag Farm	Upper Elliot	Massospondylus		A basal crocodylomorph	
Orthosuchus	O. stormbergi		Upper Elliot	Massospondylus		A possible protosuchid crocodylomorph.	
Paratetrasauropus	P. seakensis		Lower Elliot	Scalenodontoides		Large crocodilian-like footprints, probably from crocodylomorphs.	
Poposauroidea indet.		Precise provenance unknown	Lower Elliot	Scalenodontoides	NMQR 3554, near complete right ilium	An indeterminate poposauroid. Closer to Poposaurus than other taxa.	
Protosuchus	P. haughtoni		Upper Elliot	Massospondylus		A protosuchid crocodylomorph.	
Rauisuchia indet.			Lower Elliot	Scalenodontoides		A indeterminate large "rauisuchian" (non-crocodylomorph loricatan). Many "rauisuchian" fossils have been found in the formation, including very large limb bones from near Qhemegha, Eastern Cape. A large toothed maxilla, formerly considered part of "Aliwalia rex", may be rauisuchian in origin.	Large Indeterminate loricatan partial maxilla
Sauropodopus	S. antiquus		Lower Elliot	Scalenodontoides		Large Brachychirotherium-like footprints with a narrow gait.	
Sphenosuchus	S. acutus		Upper Elliot	Massospondylus		A basal crocodylomorph.	

=== Other reptiles ===
Other reptiles of the Elliot Formation
Genus	Species	Location	Stratigraphy	Assemblage Zone	Materials	Notes	Images
Australochelys	A. africanus		Upper Elliot	Massospondylus		An australochelyid testudinate (early turtle).	
Clevosaurus	C. sp.		Upper Elliot	Massospondylus		An clevosaurid rhynchocephalian.	

=== Synapsids ===
A possible late-surviving diademodontid cynodont may be present in the Upper Elliot Formation.

Synapsids of the Elliot Formation
Genus	Species	Location	Stratigraphy	Assemblage Zone	Materials	Notes	Images
Ameghinichnus	A. sp.		Upper Elliot	Massospondylus		Tritylodontid cynodont footprints.	
Diarthrognathus	D. broomi		Upper Elliot	Massospondylus		A tritheledontid cynodont	
Elliotherium	E. kersteni		Upper Elliot	Massospondylus		A tritheledontid cynodont	
Erythrotherium	E. parringtoni		Upper Elliot	Massospondylus		A mammaliaform cynodont	
Megazostrodon	M. rudnerae		Upper Elliot	Massospondylus		A megazostrodontid mammaliaform cynodont.	
Pachygenelus	P. monus		Upper Elliot	Massospondylus		A tritheledontid cynodont	
Pentasauropus	P. incredibilis		Lower Elliot	Scalenodontoides		Dicynodont footprints	
Pentasaurus	P. goggai		Lower Elliot	Scalenodontoides		A stahleckeriid dicynodont, undoubtedly the trackmaker of Pentasauropus.	
Scalenodontoides	S. macrodontes		Lower Elliot	Scalenodontoides		A very large traversodontid cynodont	
Tritheledon	T. riconoi		Upper Elliot	Massospondylus		A tritheledontid cynodont	
Tritylodon	T. longaevus		Upper Elliot	Massospondylus		A tritylodontid cynodont	

=== Other vertebrates ===
Amphibians and fish of the Elliot Formation
Genus / Taxon	Species	Location	Stratigraphy	Assemblage Zone	Materials	Notes	Images
Brachyopoidea		Quthing, Lesotho	Upper Elliot	Massospondylus		An enormous brachyopoid amphibian based on a skull fragment. Potentially the largest amphibian that has ever lived.	
Ceratodus	C. sp.		Lower–Upper Elliot	Scalenodontoides—Massospondylus		A ceratodontid lungfish.	
Chigutisauridae			Lower–Upper Elliot	Scalenodontoides—Massospondylus		Indeterminate chigutisaurid amphibians.	
Daedalichthys	D. formosa		Upper Elliot	Massospondylus		A redfieldiiform ray-finned fish, previously identified as Helichthys.	
Endemichthys	E. likhoeli		Upper Elliot	Massospondylus		A redfieldiiform ray-finned fish.	
Episcopopus	E. ventrosus		Upper Elliot	Massospondylus		Very large amphibian footprints.	
Semionotus	S. capensis		Upper Elliot	Massospondylus		A semionotid ray-finned fish.	
