= Nyana rooiwalensis =

Nyana rooiwalensis Temporal range: Late Triassic, ~Norian–Rhaetian
- μCT rendering of the holotype skull

Scientific classification
- Kingdom: Animalia
- Phylum: Chordata
- Class: Reptilia
- Clade: Dinosauria
- Clade: Saurischia
- Clade: †Sauropodomorpha
- Clade: †Massopoda
- Genus: †Nyana; Moopen et al., 2026
- Species: †N. rooiwalensis

Binomial name
- †Nyana rooiwalensis Moopen et al., 2026

Genus of sauropodomorph dinosaur

Nyana rooiwalensis is an extinct species of early massopodan sauropodomorph dinosaur described in 2026 known from the Late Triassic (Norian–Rhaetian ages) Elliot Formation of South Africa. It is the only species in the genus Nyana, (Nyana rooiwalensis) and is known from a partial articulated skull and associated fragmentary skeleton of a juvenile individual, which was 3 years old when it died.

== Discovery and naming ==
Type locality of N. rooiwalensis

The Nyana fossil material was discovered in 2018 in outcrops of the lower Elliot Formation in Eastern Cape Province, South Africa. The specimen is housed in the Evolutionary Studies Institute, where it is permanently accessioned as specimen BP/1/8468. It consists of a partial skeleton of a juvenile individual, comprising much of an articulated skull, several vertebrae, and parts of the forelimb and hindlimb.

Speculative life restoration

In 2026, Atashni Moopen and colleagues described Nyana rooiwalensis as a new genus and species of sauropodomorph dinosaur based on these fossil remains, designating BP/1/8468 as the holotype specimen. The generic name, Nyana, is a word meaning 'son' or 'child' in Xhosa, as well as 'small' in Sesotho. The specific name, rooiwalensis, references the discovery of the only known specimen in Rooiwal.
