= Basutodon =

Basutodon Temporal range: Late Triassic, ~210–201.3 Ma

Scientific classification
- Kingdom: Animalia
- Phylum: Chordata
- Class: Reptilia
- Clade: Archosauria
- Clade: Pseudosuchia
- Clade: Suchia
- Genus: †Basutodon von Huene, 1932
- Species: †B. ferox

Binomial name
- †Basutodon ferox von Huene, 1932

Extinct genus of reptiles

Basutodon is a genus of suchian archosaur from the Late Triassic (late Norian-early Rhaetian) Lower Elliot Formation of Lesotho. The type species is B. ferox.

== Discovery and naming ==
The holotype is a single tooth that was discovered alongside the remains of Euskelosaurus browni in the upper Elliot Formation, Lesotho. The species Basutodon ferox was named and described by von Huene (1932).

"Likhoelesaurus ingens", an undescribed archosauriform from the Lower Elliot Formation of South Africa, may have been the same animal as Basutodon ferox.

== Description ==
Basutodon was once classified as a prosauropod, as with Teratosaurus or as a synonym of Euskelosaurus. It was probably neither of these things, though, and is much more likely to be a dubious non-dinosaur.

Basutodon is currently listed as a basal member of Suchia, although Tolchard et al. (2019) suggested that Basutodon may belong to Rauisuchia.
