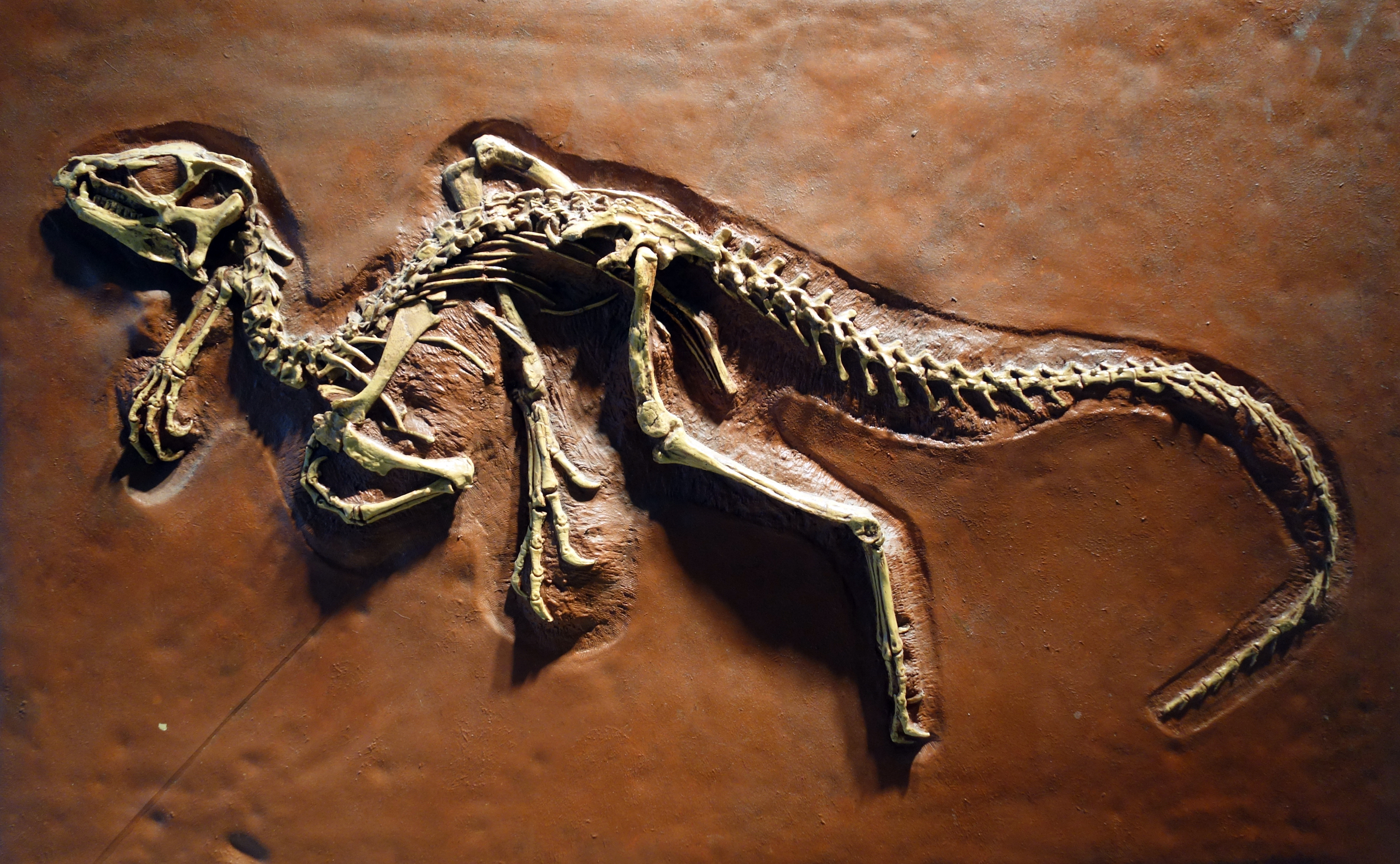
- Cast of specimen SAM-PK-K1332, University of California Museum of Palaeontology

Scientific classification
- Kingdom: Animalia
- Phylum: Chordata
- Class: Reptilia
- Clade: Dinosauria
- Clade: †Ornithischia
- Family: †Heterodontosauridae
- Genus: †Heterodontosaurus; Crompton & Charig, 1962
- Species: †H. tucki

Binomial name
- †Heterodontosaurus tucki Crompton & Charig, 1962

Synonyms
- Lycorhinus tucki Thulborn, 1970

= Heterodontosaurus =

Heterodontosaurus Temporal range: Early Jurassic, 200–190 Ma

Extinct genus of dinosaur from the early Jurassic of South Africa

Heterodontosaurus is a genus of heterodontosaurid dinosaur that lived during the Early Jurassic, 200–190 million years ago. Its only known member species, Heterodontosaurus tucki, was named in 1962 based on a skull discovered in South Africa. The genus name means "different toothed lizard", in reference to its unusual, heterodont dentition; the specific name honours G. C. Tuck, who supported the discoverers. Further specimens have since been found, including an almost complete skeleton in 1966.

Though it was a small dinosaur, Heterodontosaurus was one of the largest members of its family, reaching between 1.18 m (3 ft 10 in) and possibly 1.75 m (5 ft 9 in) in length, and weighing between 2 and 10 kg (4.4 and 22.0 lb). The skull was elongated, narrow, and triangular when viewed from the side. The front of the jaws were covered in a horny beak. It had three types of teeth; in the upper jaw, small, incisor-like teeth were followed by long, canine-like tusks. A gap divided the tusks from the chisel-like cheek-teeth. The body was short with a long tail. The five-fingered forelimbs were long and relatively robust, whereas the hind-limbs were long, slender, and had four toes.

Heterodontosaurus is the eponymous and best-known member of the family Heterodontosauridae. This family is considered a basal (or "primitive") group within the order of ornithischian dinosaurs, while their closest affinities within the group are debated. In spite of the large tusks, Heterodontosaurus is thought to have been herbivorous, or at least omnivorous. Though it was formerly thought to have been capable of quadrupedal locomotion, it is now thought to have been bipedal. Tooth replacement was sporadic and not continuous, unlike its relatives. At least four other heterodontosaurid genera are known from the same geological formations as Heterodontosaurus.

== History of discovery ==
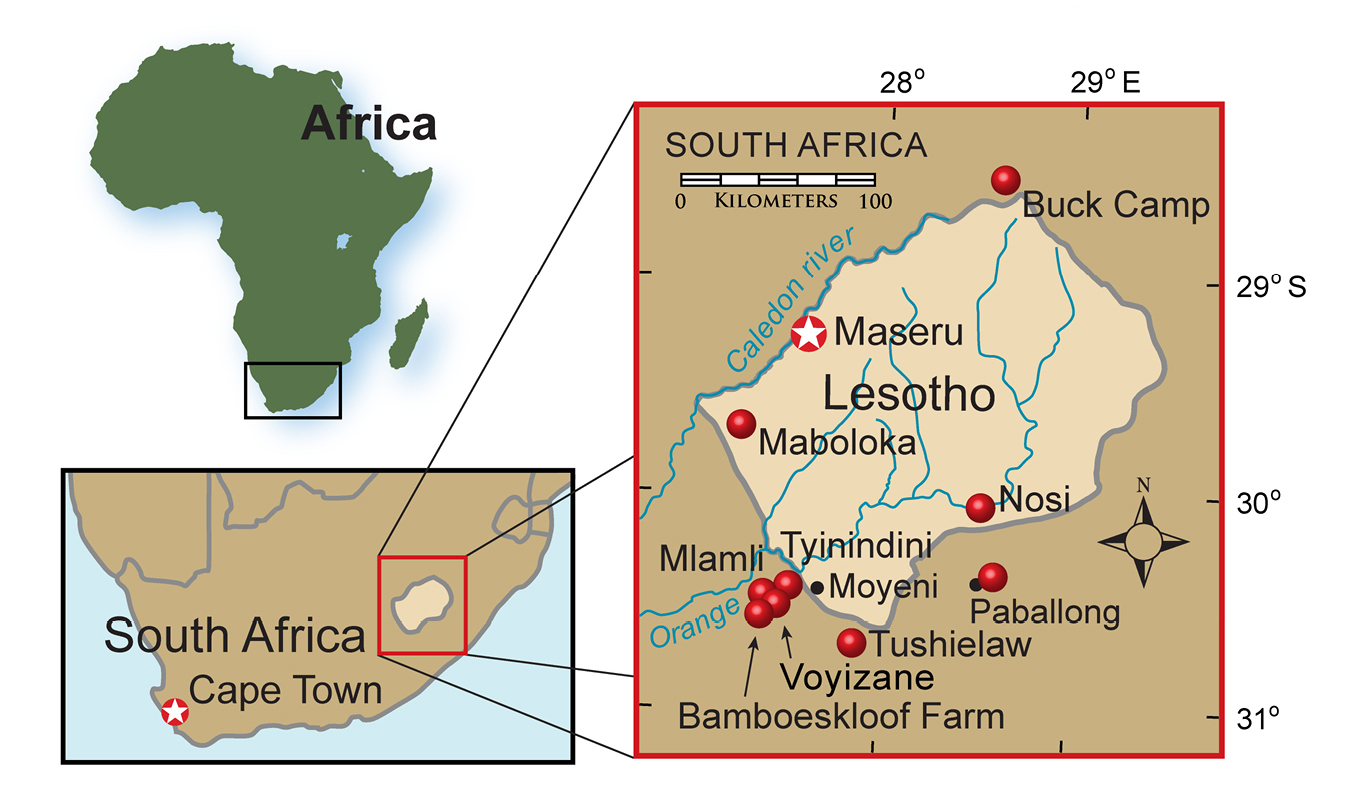
African heterodontosaurid localities: Tyinindini, Voyizane, and Tushielaw denote Heterodontosaurus finds

The holotype specimen of Heterodontosaurus tucki (SAM-PK-K337) was discovered during the British–South African expedition to South Africa and Basutoland (former name of Lesotho) in 1961–1962. Today, it is housed in the Iziko South African Museum. It was excavated on a mountain at an altitude of about 1,890 m (6,201 ft), at a locality called Tyinindini, in the district of Transkei (sometimes referred to as Herschel) in the Cape Province of South Africa. The specimen consists of a crushed but nearly complete skull; associated postcranial remains mentioned in the original description could not be located in 2011. The animal was scientifically described and named in 1962 by palaeontologists Alfred Walter Crompton and Alan J. Charig. The genus name refers to the different-shaped teeth, and the specific name honors George C. Tuck, a director of Austin Motor Company, who supported the expedition. The specimen was not fully prepared by the time of publication, so only the front parts of the skull and lower jaw were described, and the authors conceded that their description was preliminary, serving mainly to name the animal. It was considered an important discovery, as few early ornithischian dinosaurs were known at the time. The preparation of the specimen, i.e. the freeing of the bones from the rock matrix, was very time-consuming, since they were covered in a thin, very hard, ferruginous layer containing haematite. This could only be removed by a diamond saw, which damaged the specimen.

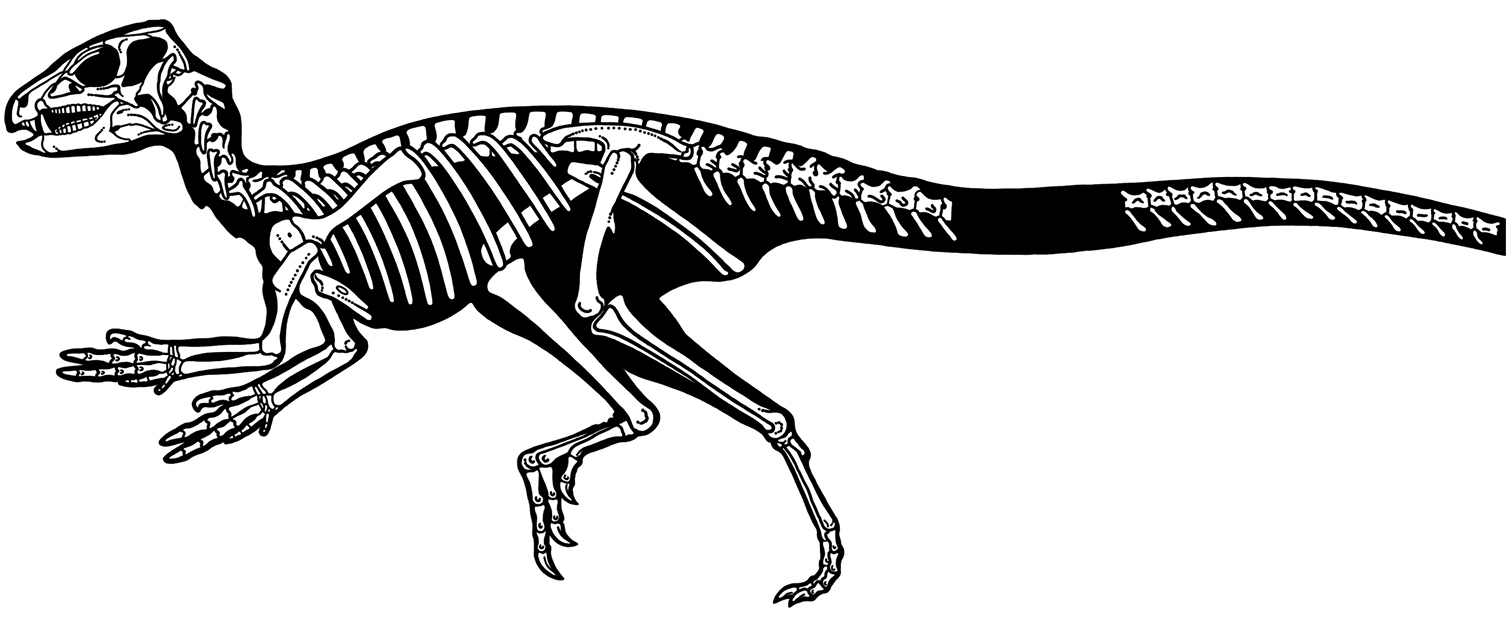
Skeletal diagram of SAM-PK-K1332

In 1966, a second specimen of Heterodontosaurus (SAM-PK-K1332) was discovered at the Voyizane locality, in the Elliot Formation of the Stormberg Group of rock formations, 1,770 m (5,807 ft) above sea level, on Krommespruit Mountain. This specimen included both the skull and skeleton, preserved in articulation (i.e. the bones being preserved in their natural position in relation to each other), with little displacement and distortion of the bones. The postcranial skeleton was briefly described by palaeontologists Albert Santa Luca, Crompton and Charig in 1976. Its forelimb bones had previously been discussed and figured in an article by the palaeontologists Peter Galton and Robert T. Bakker in 1974, as the specimen was considered significant in establishing that Dinosauria was a monophyletic natural group, whereas most scientists at the time, including the scientists who described Heterodontosaurus, thought that the two main orders Saurischia and Ornithischia were not directly related. The skeleton was fully described in 1980. SAM-PK-K1332 is the most complete heterodontosaurid skeleton described to date. Though a more detailed description of the skull of Heterodontosaurus was long promised, it remained unpublished upon the death of Charig in 1997. It was not until 2011 that the skull was fully described by the palaeontologist David B. Norman and colleagues.

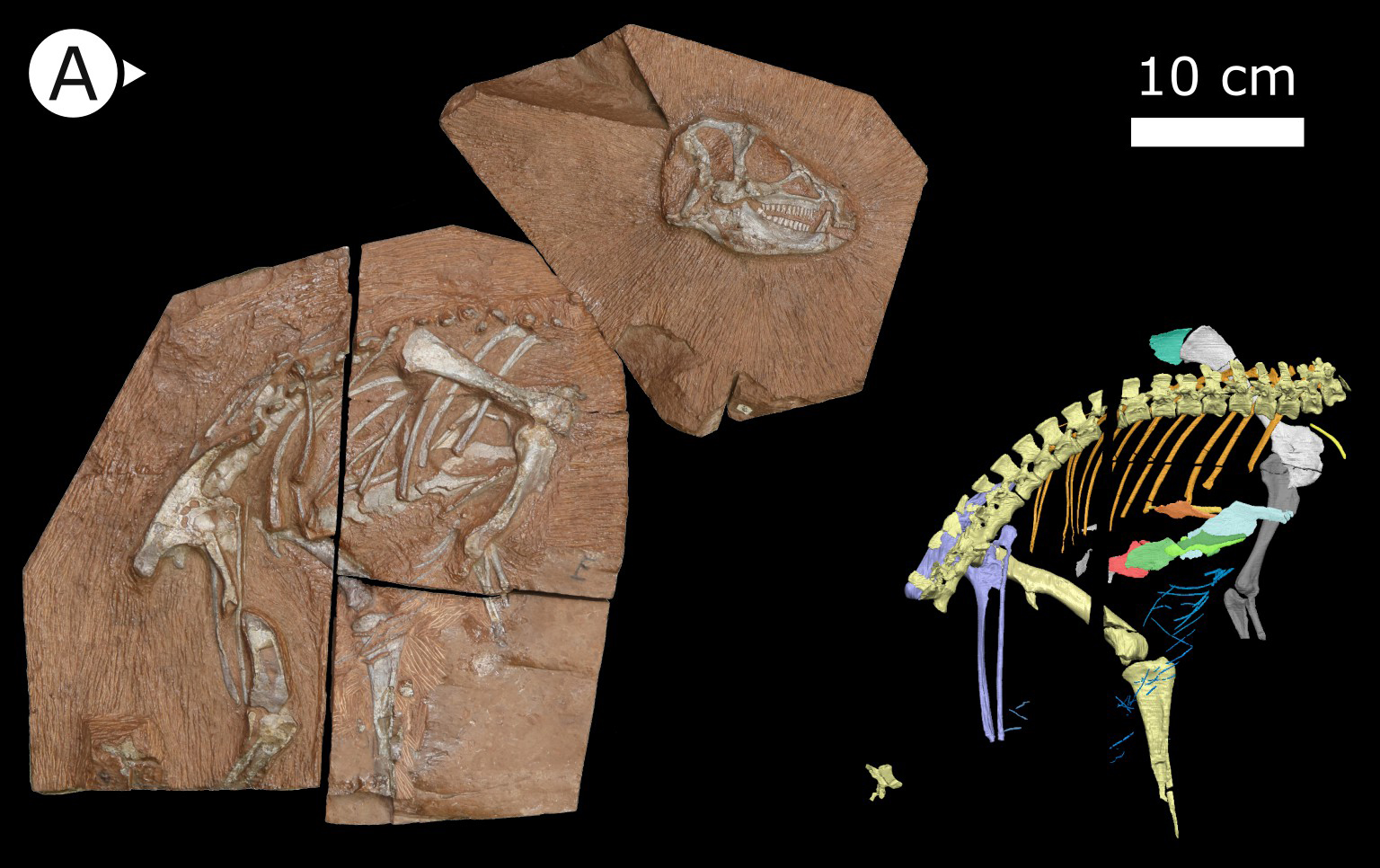
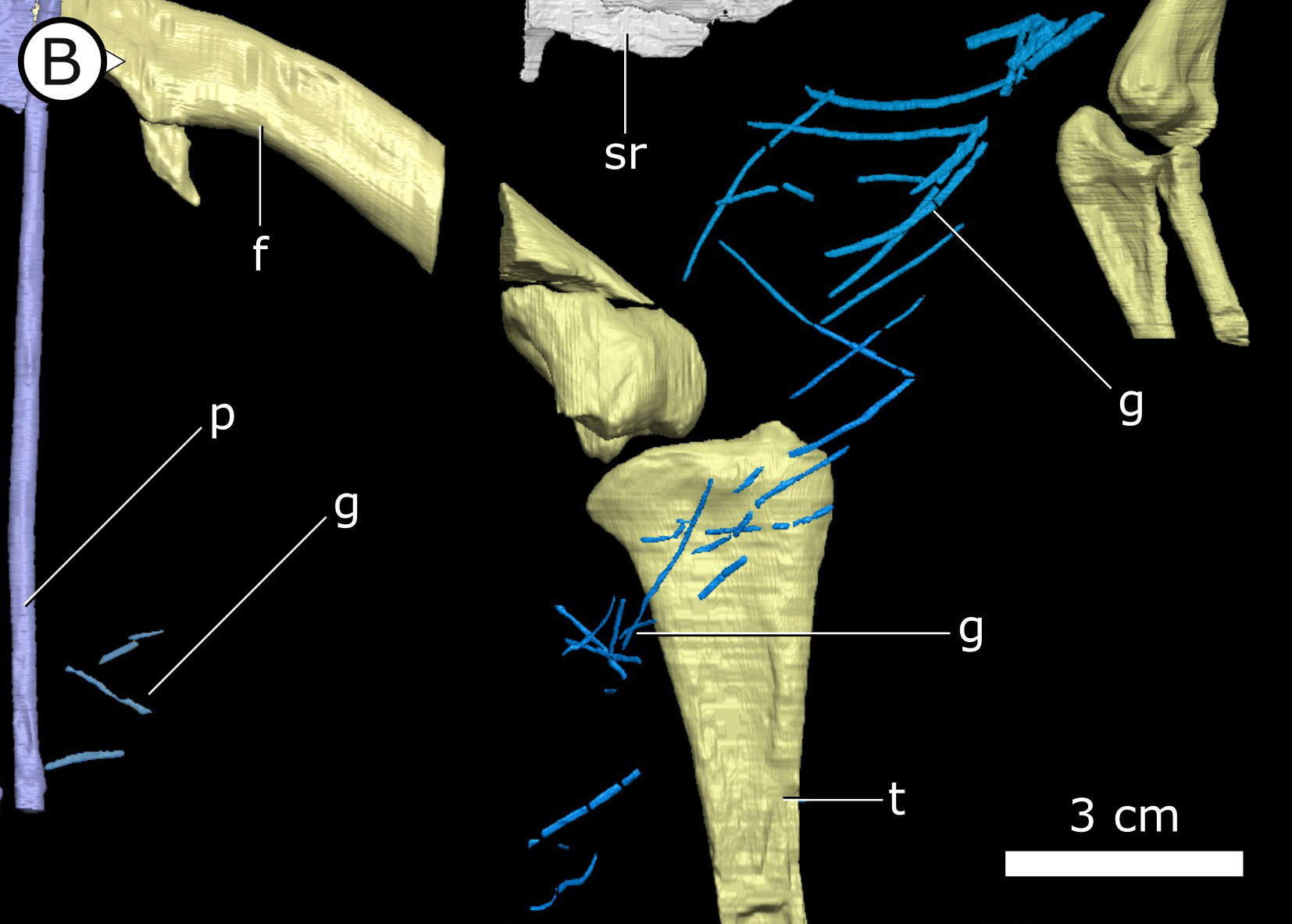
AM 4766 with synchrotron scan highlighting its gastralia

Other specimens referred to Heterodontosaurus include the front part of a juvenile skull (SAM-PK-K10487), a fragmentary maxilla (SAM-PK-K1326), a left maxilla with teeth and adjacent bones (SAM-PK-K1334), all of which were collected at the Voyizane locality during expeditions in 1966–1967, although the first was only identified as belonging to this genus in 2008. A partial snout (NM QR 1788) found in 1975 on Tushielaw Farm south of Voyizane was thought to belong to Massospondylus until 2011, when it was reclassified as Heterodontosaurus. The palaeontologist Robert Broom discovered a partial skull, possibly in the Clarens Formation of South Africa, which was sold to the American Museum of Natural History in 1913, as part of a collection that consisted almost entirely of synapsid fossils. This specimen (AMNH 24000) was first identified as belonging to a sub-adult Heterodontosaurus by Sereno, who reported it in a 2012 monograph about the Heterodontosauridae, the first comprehensive review article about the family. This review also classified a partial postcranial skeleton (SAM-PK-K1328) from Voyizane as Heterodontosaurus. However, in 2014, Galton suggested it might belong to the related genus Pegomastax instead, which was named by Sereno based on a partial skull from the same locality. In 2005, a new Heterodontosaurus specimen (AM 4766) was found in a streambed near Grahamstown in the Eastern Cape Province; it was very complete, but the rocks around it were too hard to fully remove. The specimen was therefore scanned at the European Synchrotron Radiation Facility in 2016, to help reveal the skeleton, and aid in research of its anatomy and lifestyle, some of which was published in 2021.

In 1970, palaeontologist Richard A. Thulborn suggested that Heterodontosaurus was a junior synonym of the genus Lycorhinus, which was named in 1924 with the species L. angustidens, also from a specimen discovered in South Africa. He reclassified the type species as a member of the older genus, as the new combination Lycorhinus tucki, which he considered distinct due to slight differences in its teeth and its stratigraphy. He reiterated this claim in 1974, in the description of a third Lycorhinus species, Lycorhinus consors, after criticism of the synonymy by Galton in 1973. In 1974, Charig and Crompton agreed that Heterodontosaurus and Lycorhinus belonged in the same family, Heterodontosauridae, but disagreed that they were similar enough to be considered congeneric. They also pointed out that the fragmentary nature and poor preservation of the Lycorhinus angustidens holotype specimen made it impossible to fully compare it properly to H. tucki. In spite of the controversy, neither party had examined the L. angustidens holotype first hand, but after doing so, palaeontologist James A. Hopson also defended generic separation of Heterodontosaurus in 1975, and moved L. consors to its own genus, Abrictosaurus.

== Description ==
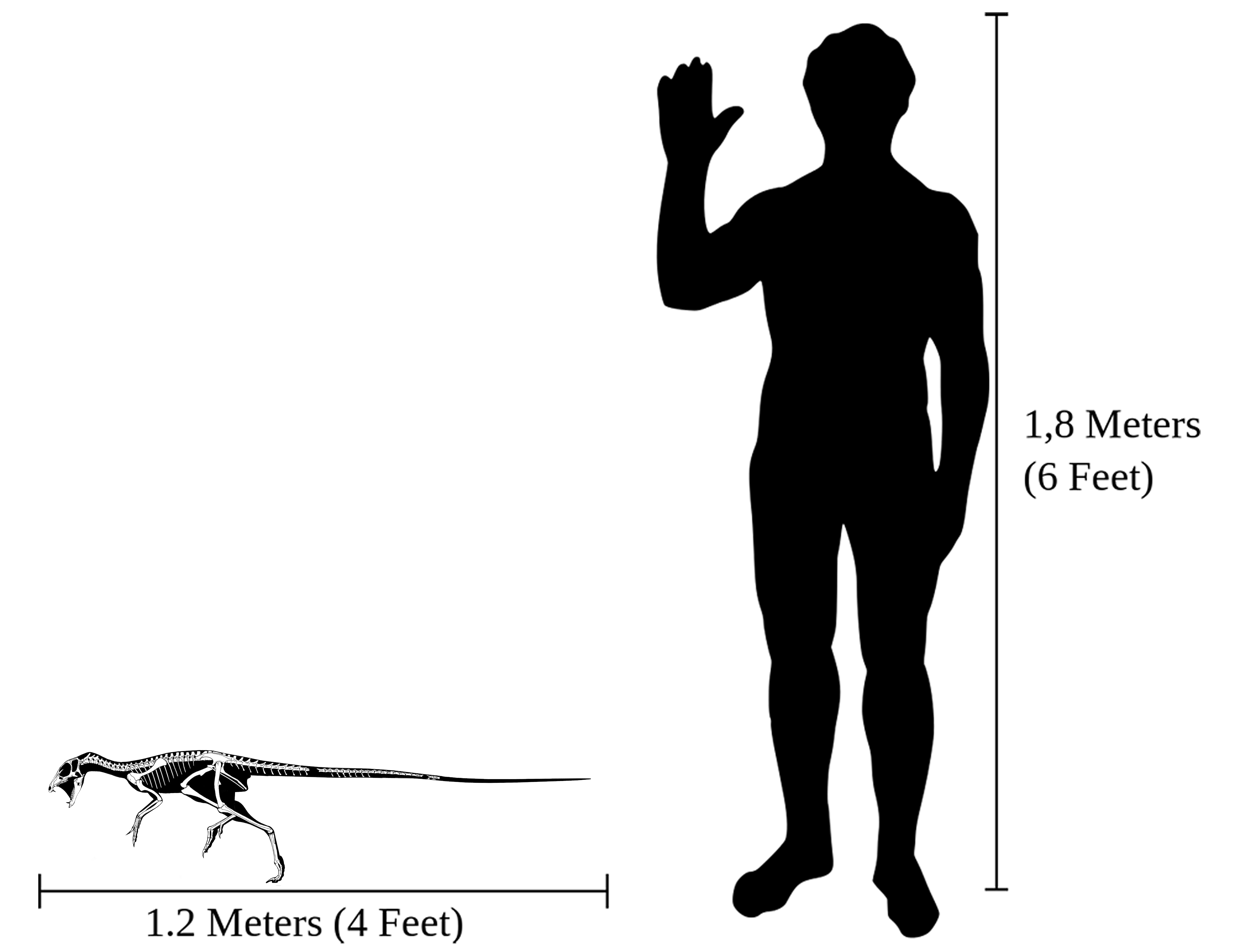
Size compared to a human

Heterodontosaurus was a small dinosaur. The most complete skeleton, SAM-PK-K1332, belonged to an animal measuring about 1.18 m (3 ft 10 in) in length. Its weight was variously estimated at 1.8 kg (4.0 lb), 2.59 kg (5.7 lb), and 3.4 kg (7.5 lb) in separate studies. The closure of vertebral sutures on the skeleton indicates that the specimen was an adult, and probably fully grown. A second specimen, consisting of an incomplete skull, indicates that Heterodontosaurus could have grown substantially larger – up to a length of 1.75 m (5 ft 9 in) and with a body mass of nearly 10 kg (22 lb). The reason for the size difference between the two specimens is unclear, and might reflect variability within a single species, sexual dimorphism, or the presence of two separate species. The size of this dinosaur has been compared to that of a turkey. Heterodontosaurus was amongst the largest known members of the family Heterodontosauridae. The family contains some of the smallest known ornithischian dinosaurs – the North American Fruitadens, for example, reached a length of only 65 to 75 cm (26 to 30 in).

Following the description of the related Tianyulong in 2009, which was preserved with hundreds of long, filamentous integuments (sometimes compared to bristles) from neck to tail, Heterodontosaurus has also been depicted with such structures, for example in publications by the palaeontologists Gregory S. Paul and Paul Sereno. Sereno has stated that a heterodontosaur may have looked like a "nimble two-legged porcupine" in life. The restoration published by Sereno also featured a hypothetical display structure located on the snout, above the nasal fossa (depression).

=== Skull and dentition ===
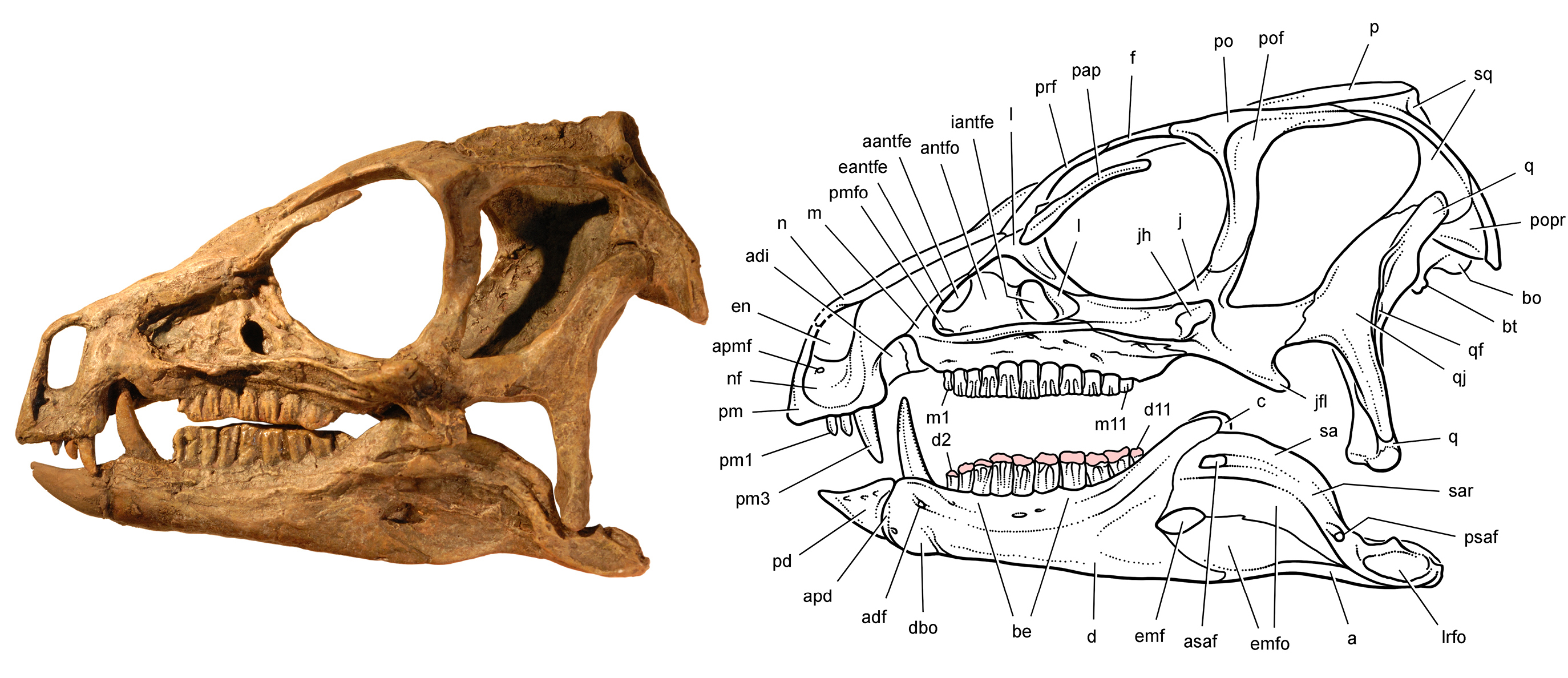
Skull cast of SAM-PK-K1332 and skull diagram reconstruction

The skull of Heterodontosaurus was small but robustly built. The two most complete skulls measured 108 mm (4 in) (holotype specimen SAM-PK-K337) and 121 mm (5 in) (specimen SAM-PK-K1332) in length. The skull was elongated, narrow, and triangular when viewed from the side, with the highest point being the sagittal crest, from where the skull sloped down towards the snout tip. The back of the skull ended in a hook-like shape, which was offset to the quadrate bone. The orbit (eye opening) was large and circular, and a large spur-like bone, the palpebral, protruded backwards into the upper part of the opening. Below the eye socket, the jugal bone gave rise to a sideways projecting boss, or horn-like structure. The jugal bone also formed a "blade" that created a slot together with a flange on the pterygoid bone, for guiding the motion of the lower jaw. Ventrally, the antorbital fossa was bounded by a prominent bony ridge, to which the animal's fleshy cheek would have been attached. It has also been suggested that heterodontosaurs and other basal (or "primitive") orhithischians had lip-like structures like lizards do (based on similarities in their jaws), rather than bridging skin between the upper and lower jaws (such as cheeks). The proportionally large lower temporal fenestra was egg-shaped and tilted back, and located behind the eye opening. The elliptical upper temporal fenestra was visible only looking at the top of the skull. The left and right upper temporal fenestrae were separated by the sagittal crest, which would have provided lateral attachment surfaces for the jaw musculature in the living animal.

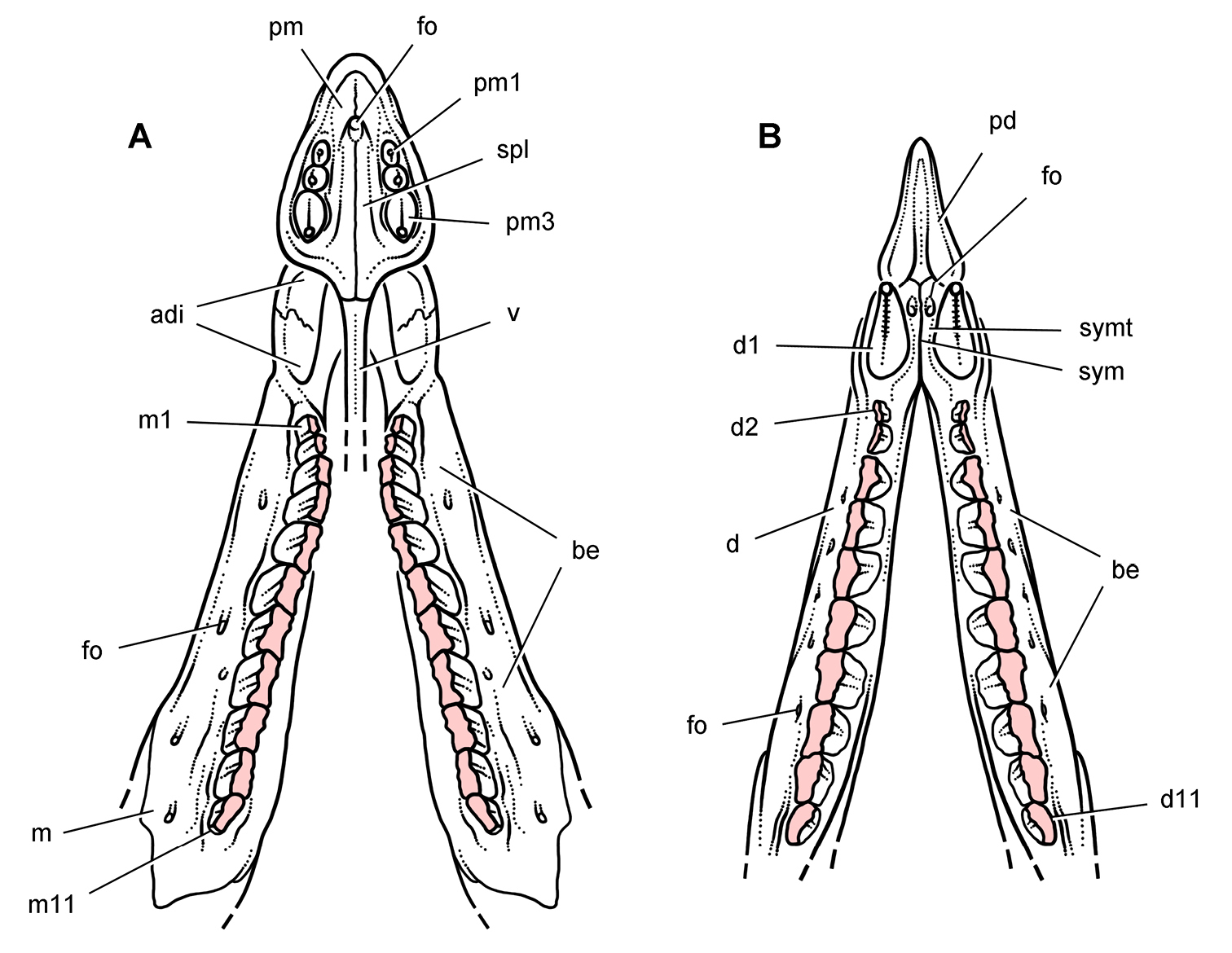
Diagrams showing the dentition of the upper and lower jaw

The lower jaw tapered towards the front, and the dentary bone (the main part of the lower jaw) was robust. The front of the jaws were covered by a toothless keratinous beak (or rhamphotheca). The upper beak covered the front of the premaxilla bone and the lower beak covered the predentary, which are, respectively, the foremost bones of the upper and lower jaw in ornithischians. This is evidenced by the rough surfaces on these structures. The palate was narrow, and tapered towards the front. The external nostril openings were small, and the upper border of this opening does not seem to have been completely bridged by bone. If not due to breakage, the gap may have been formed by connective tissue instead of bone. The antorbital fossa, a large depression between the eye and nostril openings, contained two smaller openings. A depression above the snout has been termed the "nasal fossa" or "sulcus". A similar fossa is also seen in Tianyulong, Agilisaurus, and Eoraptor, but its function is unknown.

An unusual feature of the skull was the different-shaped teeth (heterodonty) for which the genus is named, which is otherwise mainly known from mammals. Most dinosaurs (and indeed most reptiles) have a single type of tooth in their jaws, but Heterodontosaurus had three. The beaked tip of the snout was toothless, whereas the hind part of the premaxilla in the upper jaw had three teeth on each side. The first two upper teeth were small and cone-shaped (comparable to incisors), while the third on each side was much enlarged, forming prominent, canine-like tusks. These first teeth were probably partially encased by the upper beak. The first two teeth in the lower jaw also formed canines, but were much bigger than the upper equivalents.

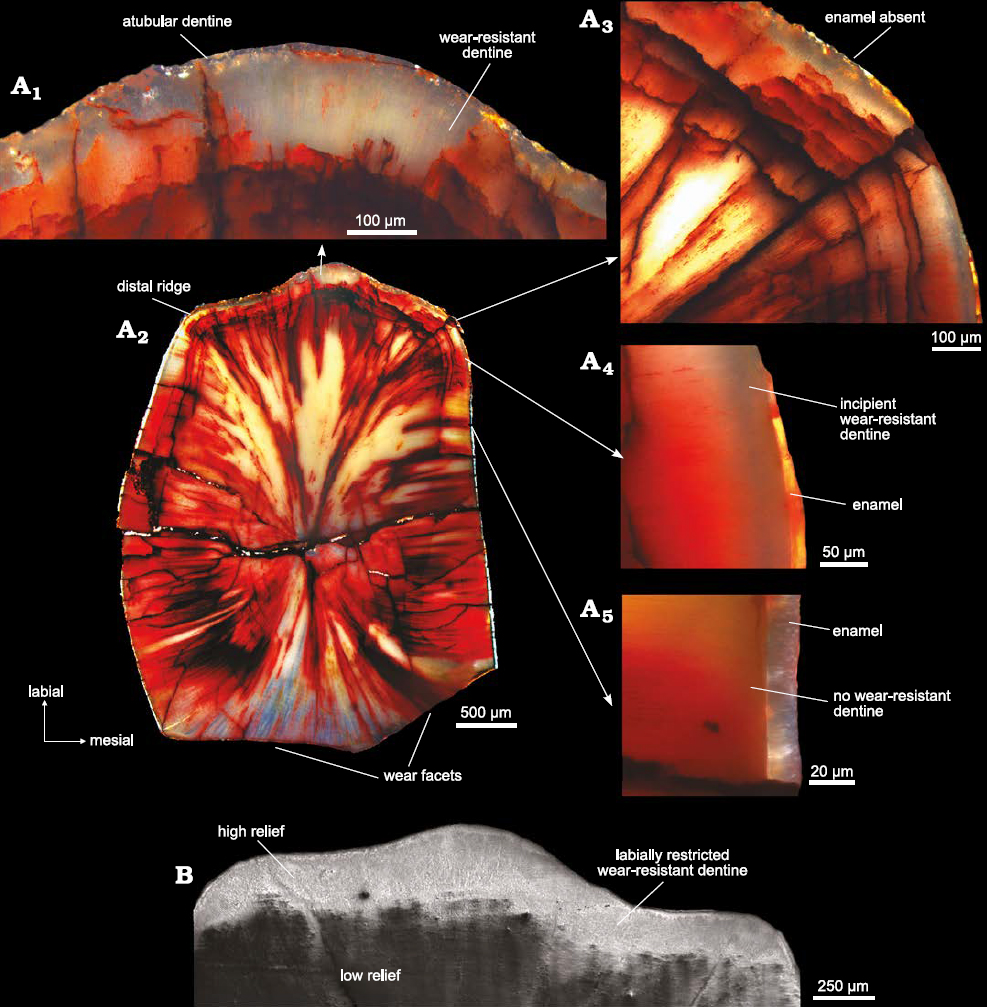
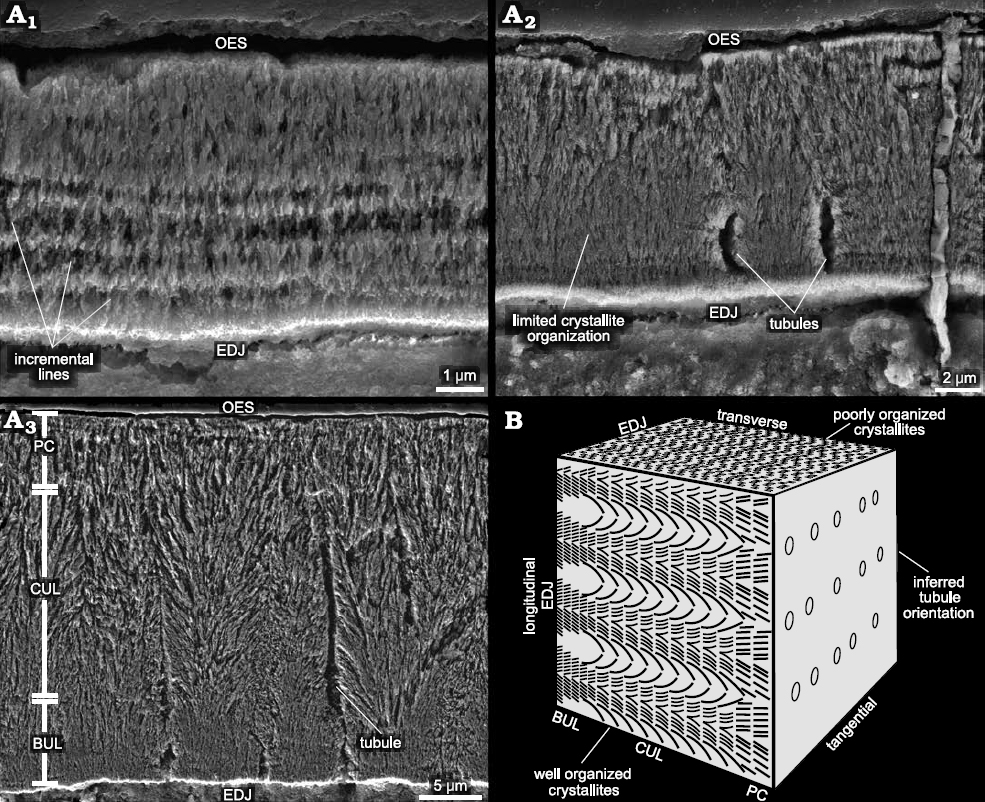
Maxillary tooth histology (left) and enamel microstructure

The canines had fine serrations along the back edge, but only the lower ones were serrated at the front. Eleven tall and chisel-like cheek-teeth lined each side of the posterior parts of the upper jaw, which were separated from the canines by a large diastema (gap). The cheek-teeth increased gradually in size, with the middle teeth being largest, and decreased in size after this point. These teeth had a heavy coat of enamel on the inwards side, and were adapted for wear (hypsodonty), and they had long roots, firmly embedded in their sockets. The tusks in the lower jaw fit into an indentation within the diastema of the upper jaw. The cheek-teeth in the lower jaw generally matched those in the upper jaw, though the enamel surface of these were on the outwards side. The upper and lower teeth rows were inset, which created a "cheek-recess" also seen in other ornithischians. Despite the different types of teeth, their histology and enamel microstructure was not complex. But while the enamel thinned out towards the outer surface of the teeth, a thick band of wear-resistant dentine arose concurrently with the thinning enamel, and formed the cutting crest of the occlusal surface, a roletypically filled by enamel.

=== Postcranial skeleton ===
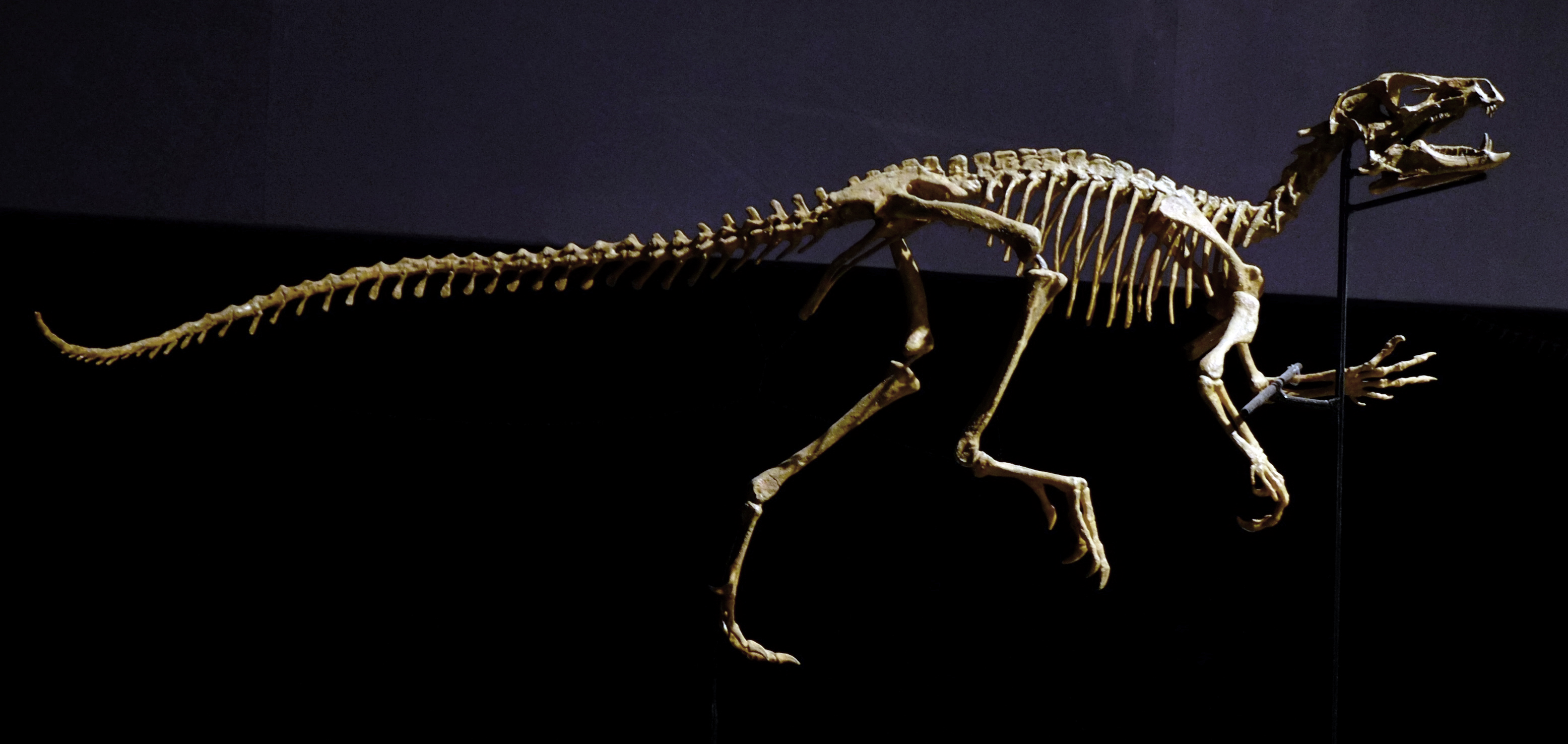
Reconstructed skeleton in Japan

The neck consisted of nine cervical vertebrae, which would have formed an S-shaped curve, as indicated by the shape of the vertebral bodies in the side view of the skeleton. The vertebral bodies of the anterior cervical vertebrae are shaped like a parallelogram, those of the middle are rectangular and those of the posterior show a trapezoid shape. The trunk was short, consisting of 12 dorsal and 6 fused sacral vertebrae. The tail was long compared to the body; although incompletely known, it probably consisted of 34 to 37 caudal vertebrae. The dorsal spine was stiffened by ossified tendons, beginning with the fourth dorsal vertebra. This feature is present in many other ornithischian dinosaurs and probably countered stress caused by bending forces acting on the spine during bipedal locomotion. In contrast to many other ornithischians, the tail of Heterodontosaurus lacked ossified tendons, and was therefore probably flexible.

The shoulder blade was capped by an additional element, the suprascapula, which is, among dinosaurs, otherwise only known from Parksosaurus. In the chest region, Heterodontosaurus possessed a well-developed pair of sternal plates that resembled those of theropods, but was different from the much simpler sternal plates of other ornithischians. The sternal plates were connected to the rib cage by elements known as sternal ribs. In contrast to other ornithischians, this connection was moveable, allowing the body to expand during breathing. Heterodontosaurus is the only known ornithischian that possessed gastralia (bony elements within the skin between the sternal plates and the pubis of the pelvis). The gastralia were arranged in two lengthwise rows, each containing around nine elements. The pelvis was long and narrow, with a pubis that resembled those possessed by more advanced ornithischians.

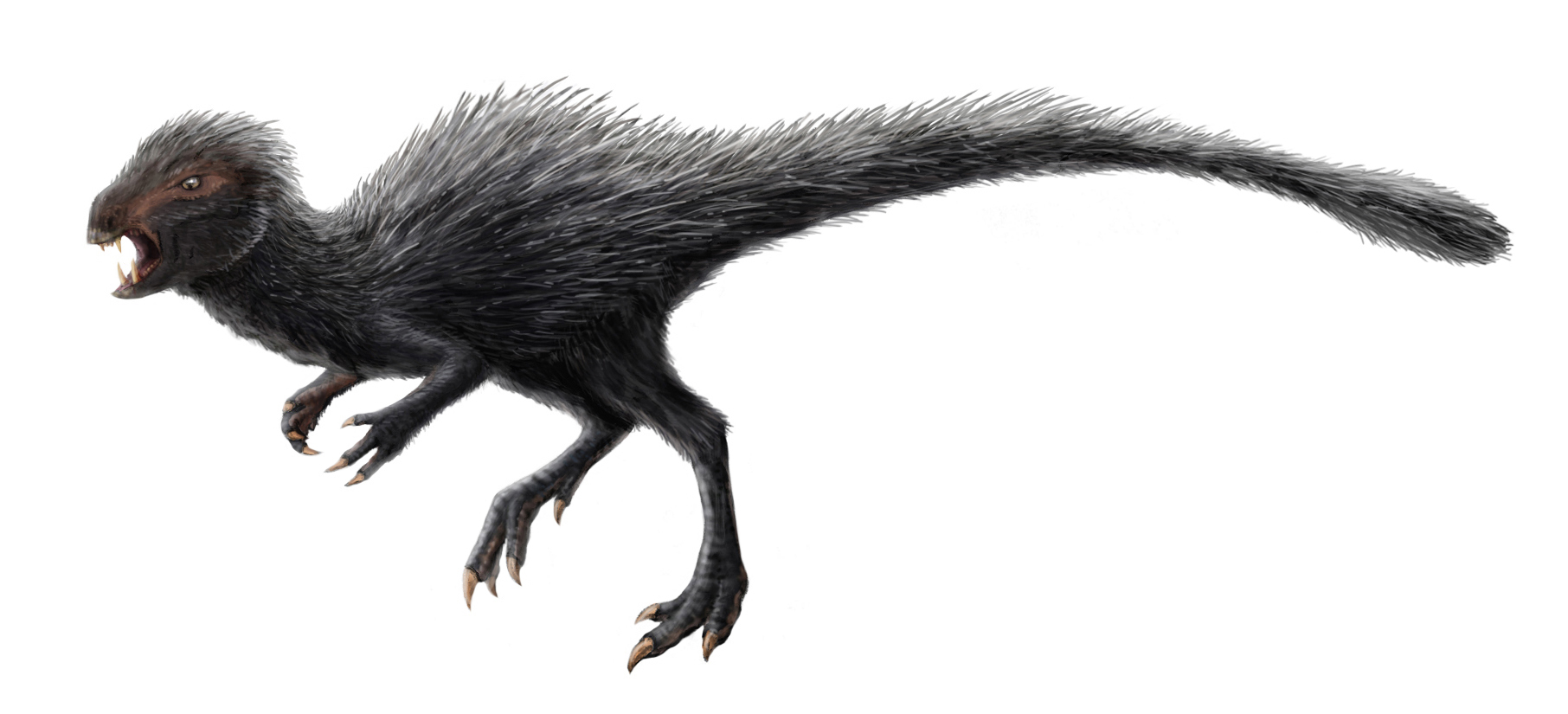
Restoration with integument based on the related genus Tianyulong

The forelimbs were robustly built and proportionally long, measuring 70% of the length of the hind limbs. The radius of the forearm measured 70% of the length of the humerus (forearm bone). The hand was large, approaching the humerus in length, and possessed five fingers equipped for grasping. The second finger was the longest, followed by the third and the first finger (the thumb). The first three fingers ended in large and strong claws. The fourth and fifth fingers were strongly reduced, and possibly vestigial. The phalangeal formula, which states the number of finger bones in each finger starting from the first, was 2-3-4-3-2.

The hindlimbs were long, slender, and ended in four toes, the first of which (the hallux) did not contact the ground. Uniquely for ornithischians, several bones of the leg and foot were fused: the tibia and fibula were fused with upper tarsal bones (astragalus and calcaneus), forming a tibiotarsus, while the lower tarsal bones were fused with the metatarsal bones, forming a tarsometatarsus. This constellation can also be found in modern birds, where it has evolved independently. The tibiotarsus was about 30% longer than the femur. The ungual bones of the toes were claw-like, and not hoof-like as in more advanced ornithischians.

== Classification ==
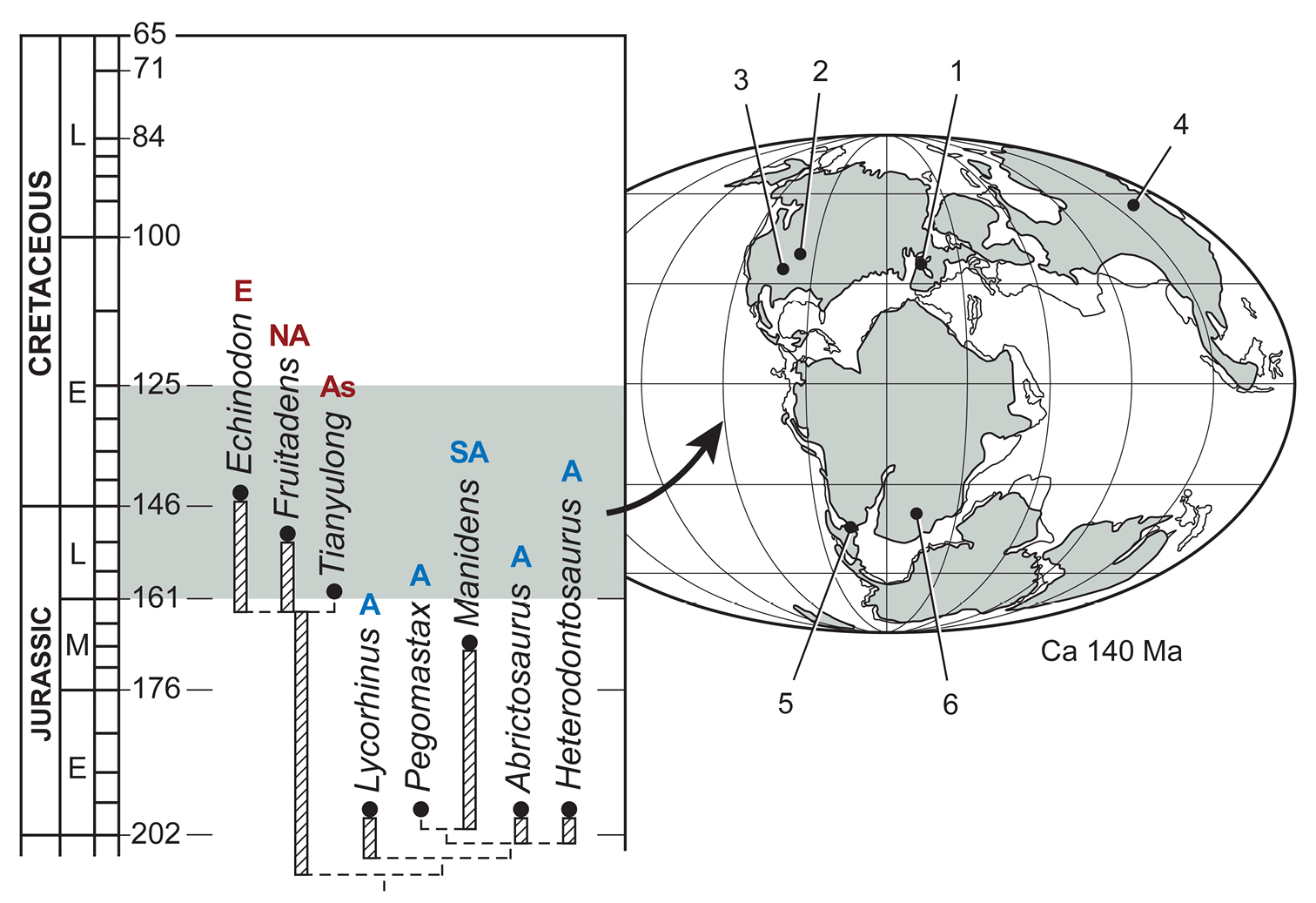
Biogeographic distribution of heterodontosaurids in time

When it was described in 1962, Heterodontosaurus was classified as a primitive member of Ornithischia, one of the two main orders of Dinosauria (the other being Saurischia). The authors found it most similar to the poorly known genera Geranosaurus and Lycorhinus, the second of which had been considered a therapsid stem-mammal until then due to its dentition. They noted some similarities with ornithopods, and provisionally placed the new genus in that group. The palaeontologists Alfred Romer and Oskar Kuhn independently named the family Heterodontosauridae in 1966 as a family of ornithischian dinosaurs including Heterodontosaurus and Lycorhinus. Thulborn instead considered these animals as hypsilophodontids, and not a distinct family. Bakker and Galton recognised Heterodontosaurus as important to the evolution of ornithischian dinosaurs, as its hand pattern was shared with primitive saurischians, and therefore was primitive or basal to both groups. This was disputed by some scientists who believed the two groups had instead evolved independently from "thecodontian" archosaur ancestors, and that their similarities were due to convergent evolution. Some authors also suggested a relationship, such as descendant/ancestor, between heterodontosaurids and fabrosaurids, both being primitive ornithischians, as well as to primitive ceratopsians, such as Psittacosaurus, though the nature of these relations was debated.

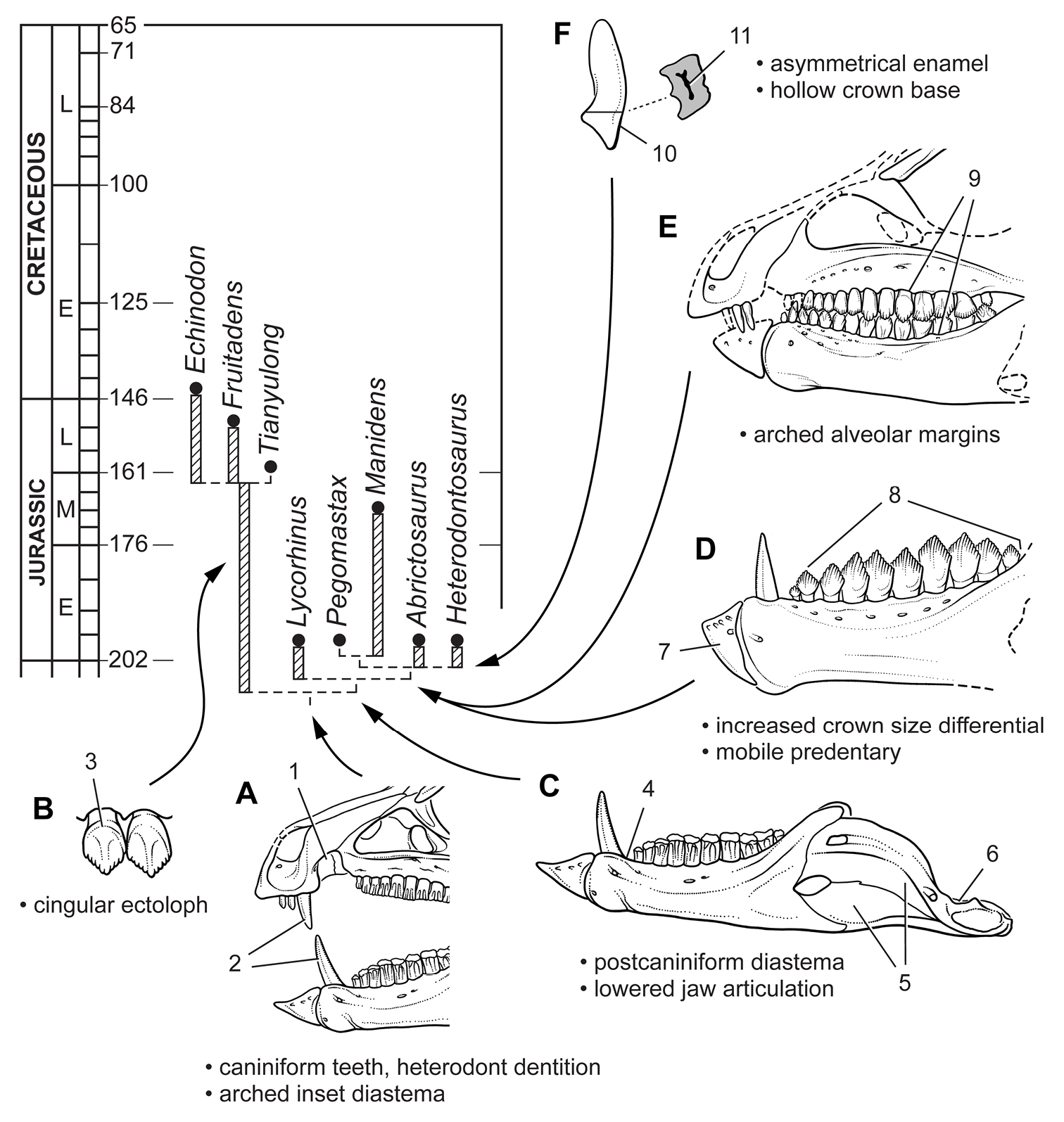
Evolution of key masticatory specialisations in heterodontosaurids, according to Sereno, 2012

By the 1980s, most researchers considered the heterodontosaurids as a distinct family of primitive ornithischian dinosaurs, but with an uncertain position with respect to other groups within the order. By the early 21st century, the prevailing theories were that the family was the sister group of either the Marginocephalia (which includes pachycephalosaurids and ceratopsians), or the Cerapoda (the former group plus ornithopods), or as one of the most basal radiations of ornithischians, before the split of the Genasauria (which includes the derived ornithischians). Heterodontosauridae was defined as a clade by Sereno in 1998 and 2005, and the group shares skull features such as three or fewer teeth in each premaxilla, caniniform teeth followed by a diastema, and a jugal horn below the eye. In 2006, palaeontologist Xu Xing and colleagues named the clade Heterodontosauriformes, which included Heterodontosauridae and Marginocephalia, since some features earlier only known from heterodontosaurs were also seen in the basal ceratopsian genus Yinlong.

Many genera have been referred to Heterodontosauridae since the family was erected, yet Heterodontosaurus remains the most completely known genus, and has functioned as the primary reference point for the group in the palaeontological literature. The cladogram below shows the interrelationships within Heterodontosauridae, and follows the analysis by Sereno, 2012:

- Heterodontosauridae
  - - Echinodon
    - Fruitadens
    - Tianyulong
  - Heterodontosaurinae
    - Lycorhinus
    - - - Pegomastax
        - Manidens
      - - Abrictosaurus
        - Heterodontosaurus

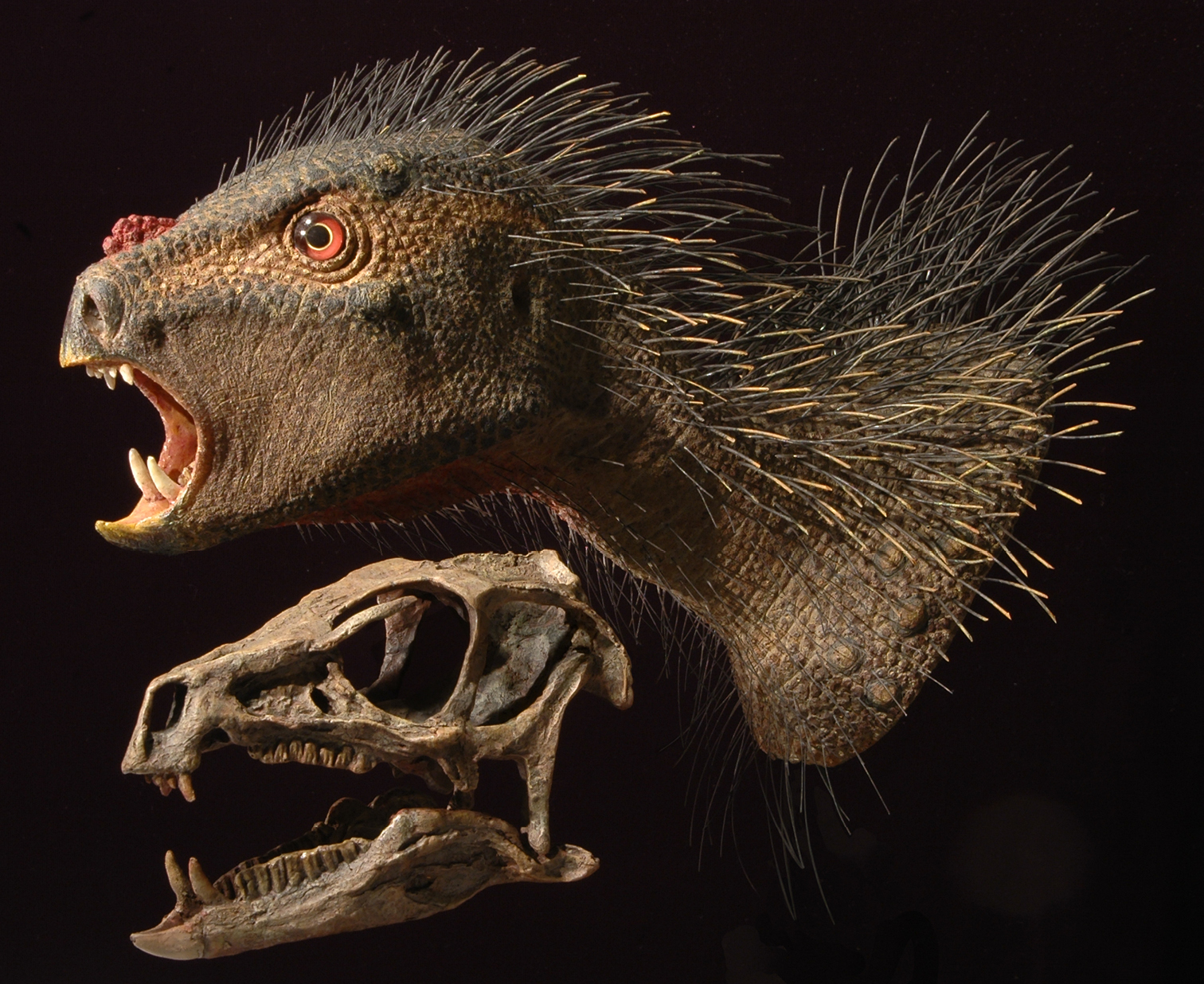
Model and skull cast (top), and timelapse video (bottom) showing the construction of the model built around a skull cast, including musculature

Heterodontosaurids persisted from the Late Triassic until the Early Cretaceous period, and existed for at least a 100 million years. They are known from Africa, Eurasia, and the Americas, but the majority have been found in southern Africa. Heterodontosaurids appear to have split into two main lineages by the Early Jurassic; one with low-crowned teeth, and one with high-crowned teeth (including Heterodontosaurus). The members of these groups are divided biogeographically, with the low-crowned group having been discovered in areas that were once part of Laurasia (northern landmass), and the high-crowned group from areas that were part of Gondwana (southern landmass). In 2012, Sereno labelled members of the latter grouping a distinct subfamily, Heterodontosaurinae. Heterodontosaurus appears to be the most derived heterodontosaurine, due to details in its teeth, such as very thin enamel, arranged in an asymmetrical pattern. The unique tooth and jaw features of heterodontosaurines appear to be specialisations for effectively processing plant material, and their level of sophistication is comparable to that of later ornithischians.

In 2017, similarities between the skeletons of Heterodontosaurus and the early theropod Eoraptor were used by palaeontologist Matthew G. Baron and colleagues to suggest that ornithischians should be grouped with theropods in a group called Ornithoscelida. Traditionally, theropods have been grouped with sauropodomorphs in the group Saurischia. In 2020, palaeontologist Paul-Emile Dieudonné and colleagues suggested that members of Heterodontosauridae were basal marginocephalians not forming their own natural group, instead progressively leading to Pachycephalosauria, and were therefore basal members of that group. This hypothesis would reduce the ghost lineage of pachycephalosaurs and pull back the origins of ornithopods back to the Early Jurassic. The subfamily Heterodontosaurinae was considered a valid clade within Pachycephalosauria, containing Heterodontosaurus, Abrictosaurus, and Lycorhinus.

== Palaeobiology ==
=== Diet and tusk function ===
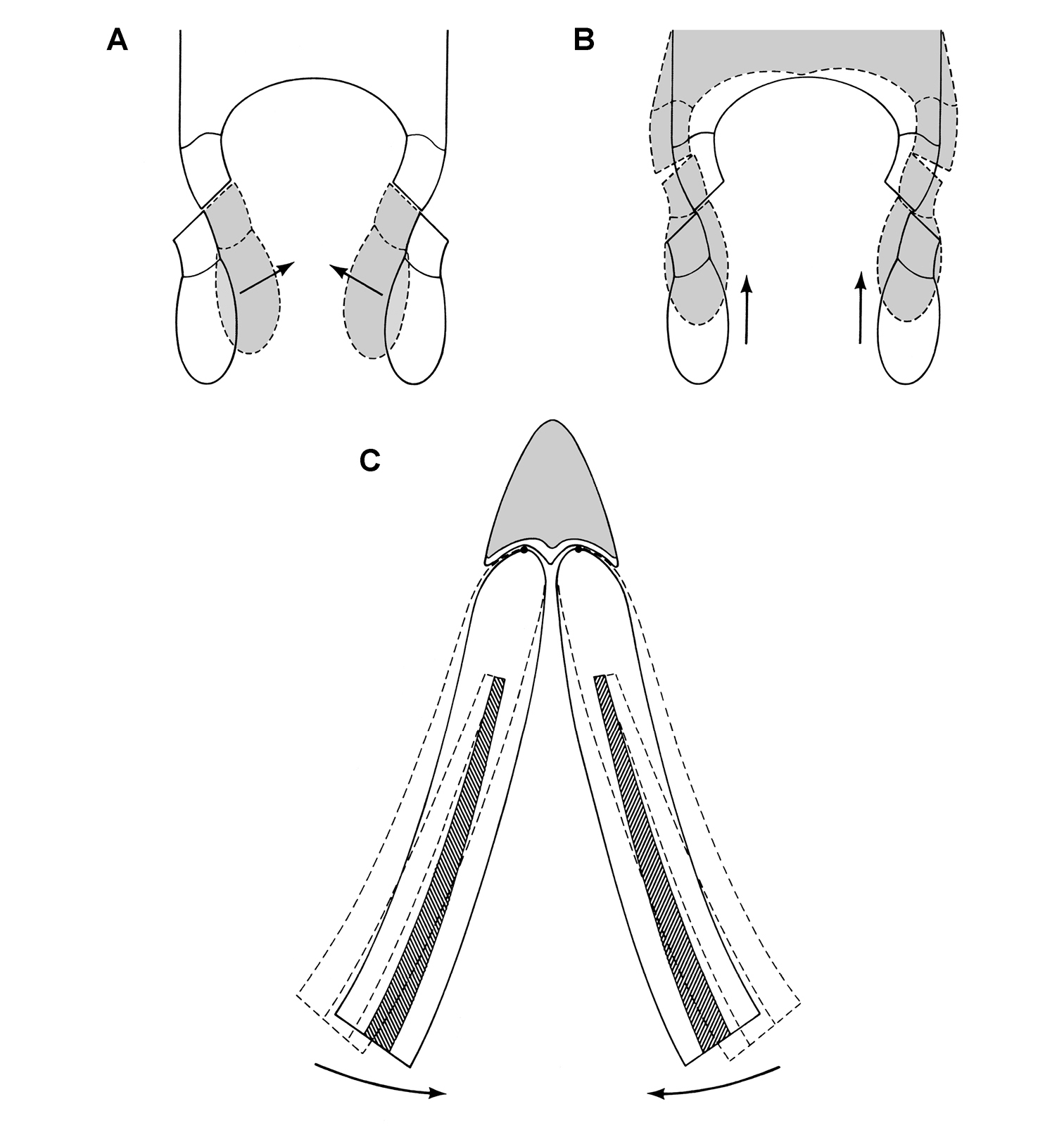
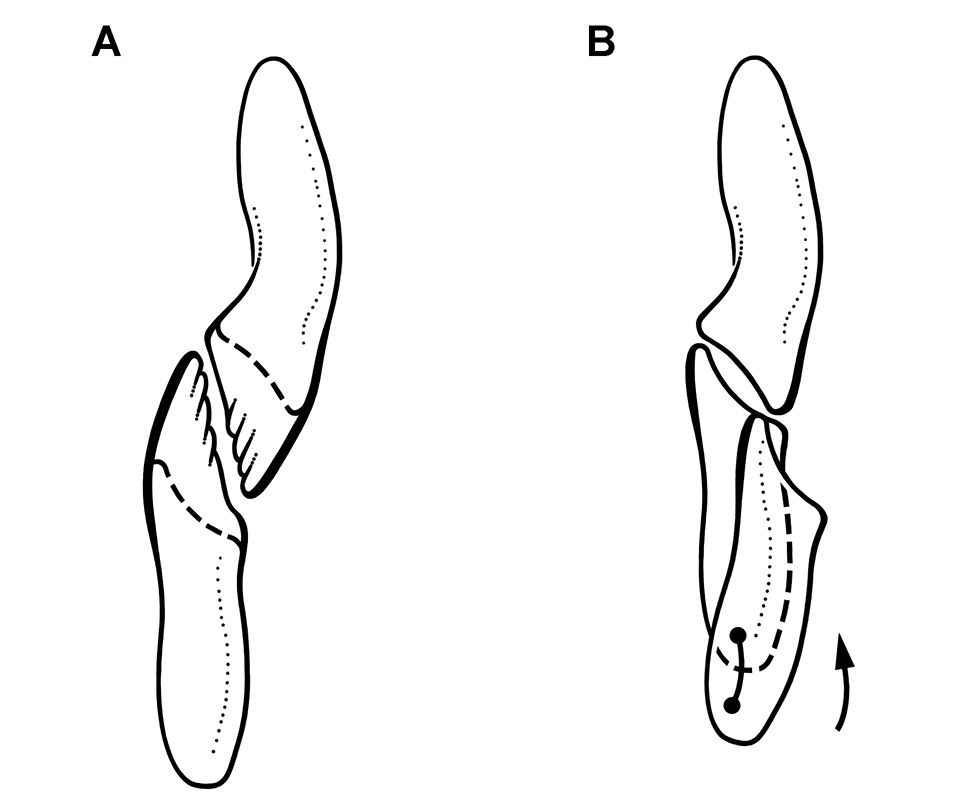
Diagram showing hypotheses for jaw movement during tooth-to-tooth occlusion (left), and occlusion between an upper and lower cheek tooth in side view (right)

Heterodontosaurus is commonly regarded as a herbivorous dinosaur. In 1974, Thulborn proposed that the tusks of the dinosaur played no important role in feeding; rather, that they would have been used in combat with conspecifics, for display, as a visual threat, or for active defence. Similar functions are seen in the enlarged tusks of modern muntjacs and chevrotains, but the curved tusks of warthogs (used for digging) are dissimilar.

Several more recent studies have raised the possibility that the dinosaur was omnivorous and used its tusks for prey killing during an occasional hunt. In 2000, Paul Barrett suggested that the shape of the premaxillary teeth and the fine serration of the tusks are reminiscent of carnivorous animals, hinting at facultative carnivory. In contrast, the muntjac lacks serration on its tusks. In 2008, Butler and colleagues argued that the enlarged tusks formed early in the development of the individual, and therefore could not constitute sexual dimorphism. Combat with conspecifics thus is an unlikely function, as enlarged tusks would be expected only in males if they were a tool for combat. Instead, feeding or defence functions are more likely. It has also been suggested that Heterodontosaurus could have used its jugal bosses to deliver blows during combat, and that the palpebral bone could have protected the eyes against such attacks. In 2011, Norman and colleagues drew attention to the arms and hands, which are relatively long and equipped with large, recurved claws. These features, in combination with the long hindlimbs that allowed for fast running, would have made the animal capable of seizing small prey. As an omnivore, Heterodontosaurus would have had a significant selection advantage during the dry season when vegetation was scarce.

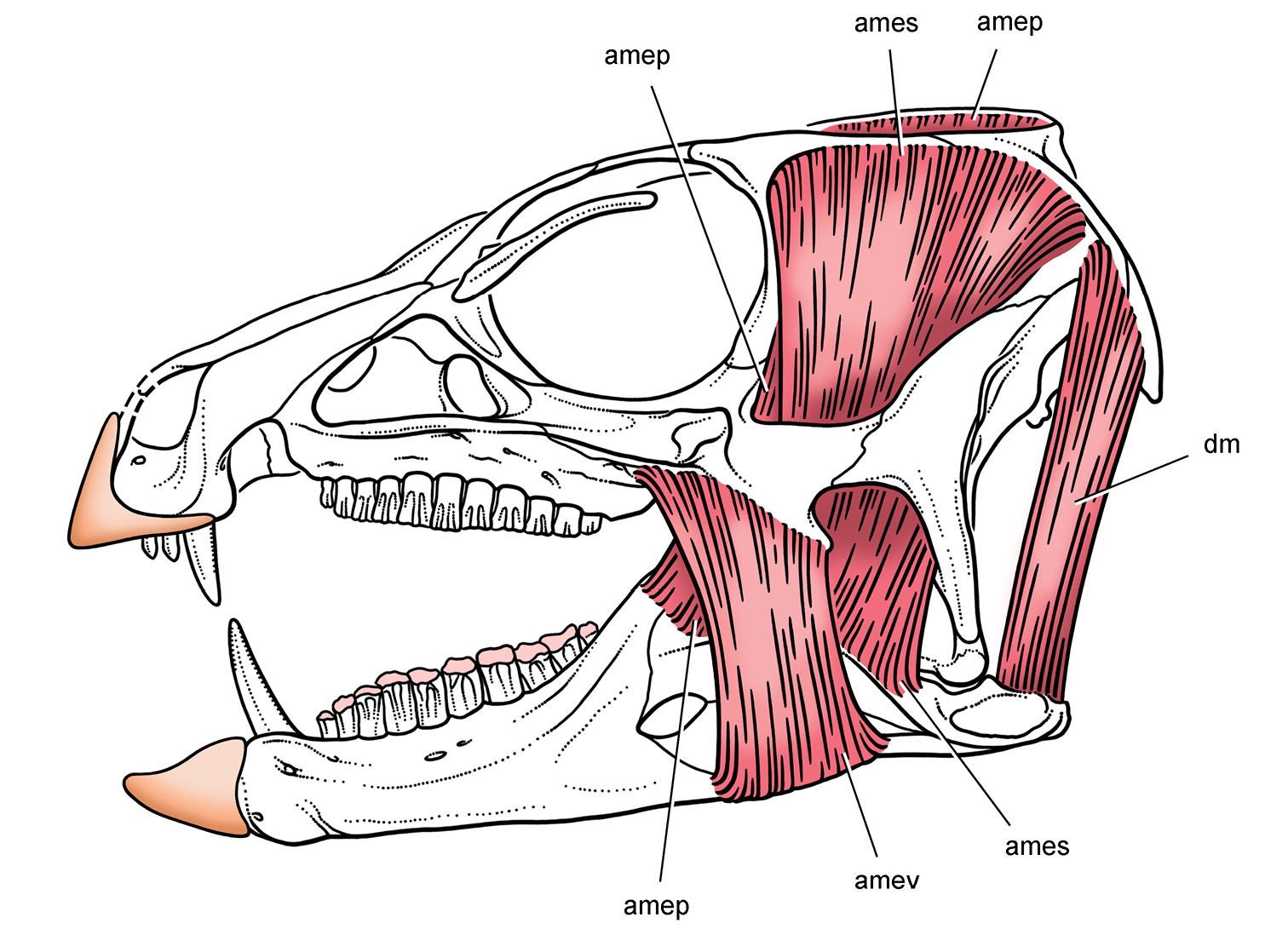
Reconstruction of jaw musculature and keratin sheathing of the beak

In 2012, Sereno pointed out several skull and dentition features that suggest a purely or at least preponderantly herbivorous diet. These include the horny beak and the specialised cheek teeth (suitable for cutting off vegetation), as well as fleshy cheeks which would have helped keeping food within the mouth during mastication. The jaw muscles were enlarged, and the jaw joint was set below the level of the teeth. This deep position of the jaw joint would have allowed an evenly spread bite along the tooth row, in contrast to the scissor-like bite seen in carnivorous dinosaurs. Finally, size and position of the tusks are very different in separate members of the Heterodontosauridae; a specific function in feeding thus appears unlikely. Sereno surmised that heterodontosaurids were comparable to today's peccaries, which possess similar tusks and feed on a variety of plant material such as roots, tubers, fruits, seeds and grass. Butler and colleagues suggested that the feeding apparatus of Heterodontosaurus was specialised to process tough plant material, and that late-surviving members of the family (Fruitadens, Tianyulong and Echinodon) probably showed a more generalised diet including both plants and invertebrates. Heterodontosaurus was characterised by a strong bite at small gape angles, but the later members were adapted to a more rapid bite and wider gapes. A 2016 study of ornithischian jaw mechanics found that the relative bite forces of Heterodontosaurus was comparable to that of the more derived Scelidosaurus. The study suggested that the tusks could have played a role in feeding by grazing against the lower beak while cropping vegetation.

=== Tooth replacement and aestivation ===
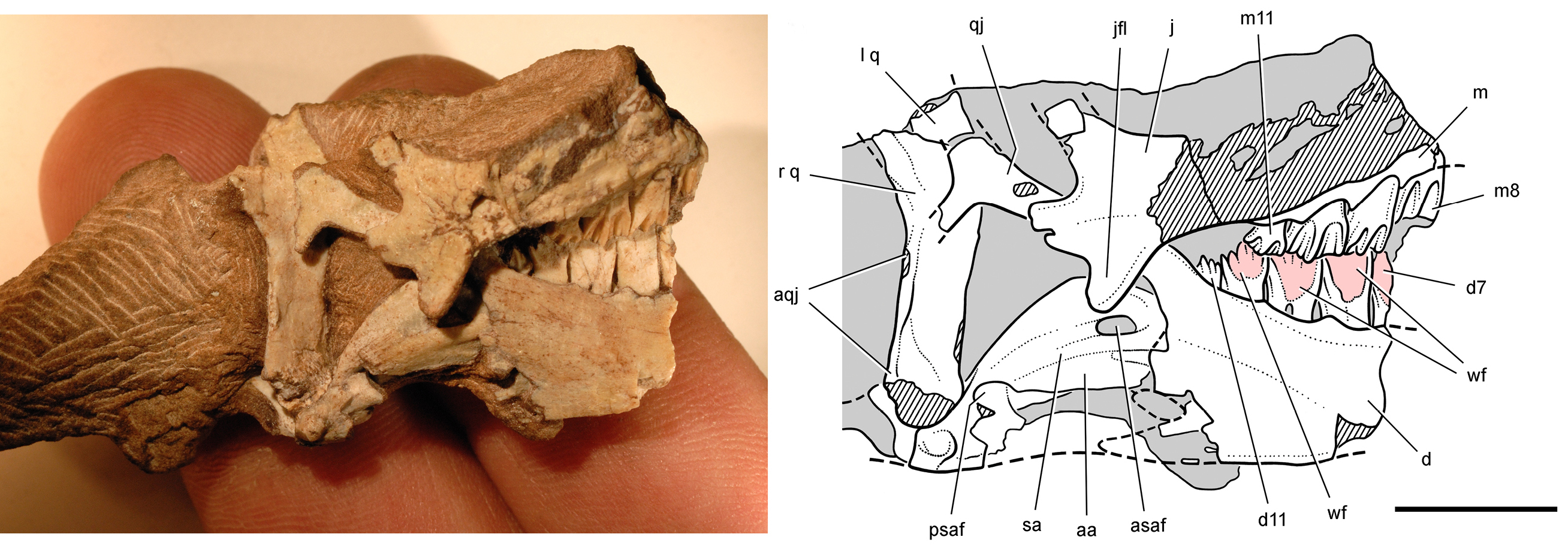
Hind part of juvenile skull AMNH 24000 with diagram

CT scan video showing replacement teeth and wear facet orientation in AMNH 24000

Much controversy has surrounded the question of whether or not, and to what degree, Heterodontosaurus showed the continuous tooth replacement that is typical for other dinosaurs and reptiles. In 1974 and 1978, Thulborn found that the skulls known at that time lacked any indications of continuous tooth replacement: The cheek teeth of the known skulls are worn uniformly, indicating that they formed simultaneously. Newly erupted teeth are absent. Further evidence was derived from the wear facets of the teeth, which were formed by tooth-to-tooth contact of the lower with the upper dentition. The wear facets were merged into one another, forming a continuous surface along the complete tooth row. This surface indicates that food procession was achieved by back and forth movements of the jaws, not by simple vertical movements which was the case in related dinosaurs such as Fabrosaurus. Back and forth movements are only possible if the teeth are worn uniformly, again strengthening the case for the lack of a continuous tooth replacement. Simultaneously, Thulborn stressed that a regular tooth replacement was essential for these animals, as the supposed diet consisting of tough plant material would have led to quick abrasion of the teeth. These observations led Thulborn to conclude that Heterodontosaurus must have replaced its entire set of teeth at once on a regular basis. Such a complete replacement could only have been possible within phases of aestivation, when the animal did not feed. Aestivation also complies with the supposed habitat of the animals, which would have been desert-like, including hot dry seasons when food was scarce.

A comprehensive analysis conducted in 1980 by Hopson questioned Thulborn's ideas. Hopson showed that the wear facet patterns on the teeth in fact indicate vertical and lateral rather than back and forth jaw movements. Furthermore, Hopson demonstrated variability in the degree of tooth wear, indicating continuous tooth replacement. He did acknowledge that X-ray images of the most complete specimen showed that this individual indeed lacked unerupted replacement teeth. According to Hopson, this indicated that only juveniles continuously replaced their teeth, and that this process ceased when reaching adulthood. Thulborn's aestivation hypothesis was rejected by Hopson due to lack of evidence.

In 2006, Butler and colleagues conducted computer tomography scans of the juvenile skull SAM-PK-K10487. To the surprise of these researchers, replacement teeth yet to erupt were present even in this early ontogenetic stage. Despite these findings, the authors argued that tooth replacement must have occurred since the juvenile displayed the same tooth morphology as adult individuals – this morphology would have changed if the tooth simply grew continuously. In conclusion, Butler and colleagues suggested that tooth replacement in Heterodontosaurus must have been more sporadic than in related dinosaurs. Unerupted replacement teeth in Heterodontosaurus were not discovered until 2011, when Norman and colleagues described the upper jaw of specimen SAM-PK-K1334. Another juvenile skull (AMNH 24000) described by Sereno in 2012 also yielded unerupted replacement teeth. As shown by these discoveries, tooth replacement in Heterodontosaurus was episodical and not continuous as in other heterodontosaurids. The unerupted teeth are triangular in lateral view, which is the typical tooth morphology in basal ornithischians. The characteristic chisel-like shape of the fully erupted teeth therefore resulted from tooth-to-tooth contact between the dentition of the upper and lower jaws.

=== Locomotion, metabolism and breathing ===
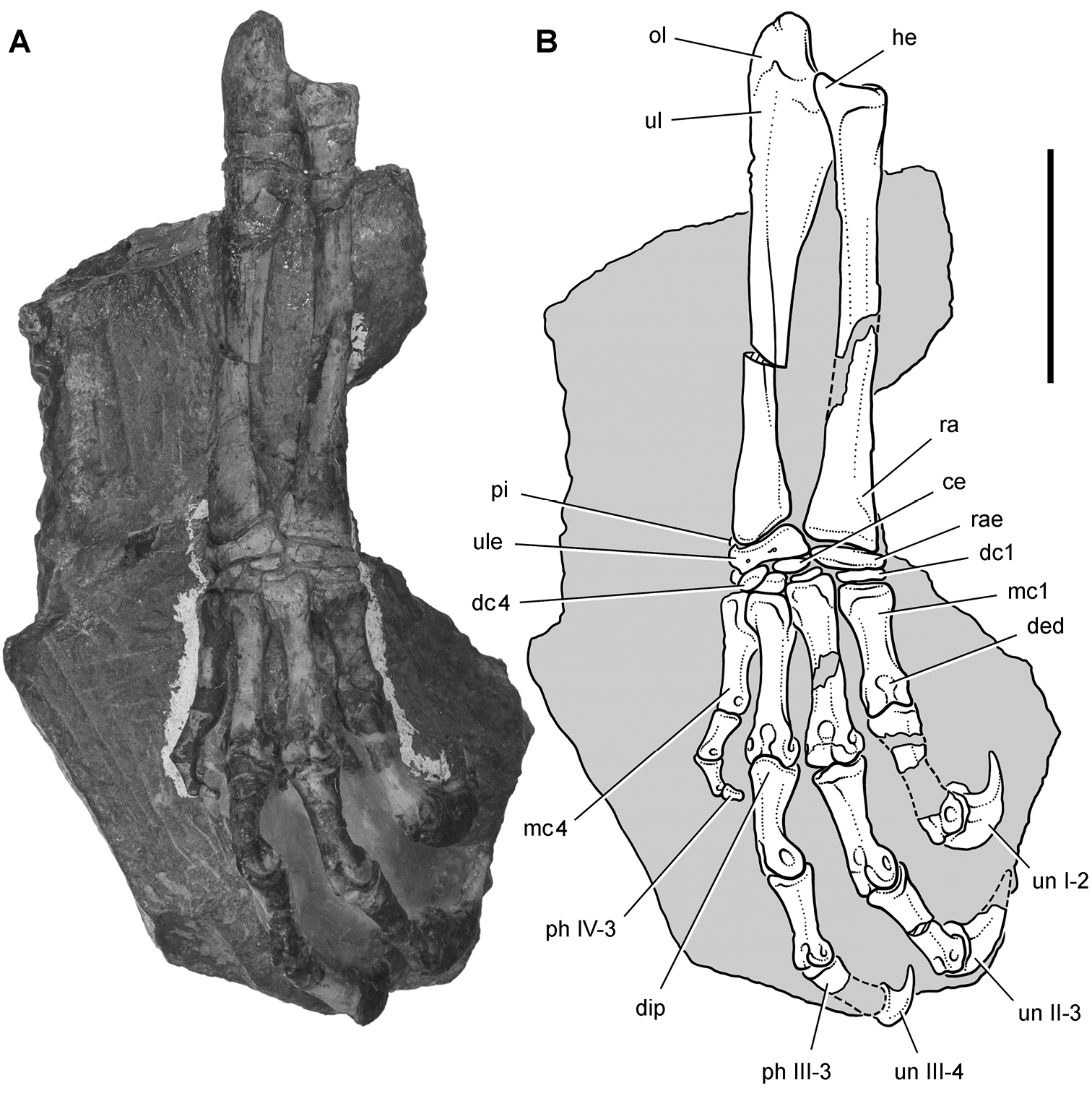
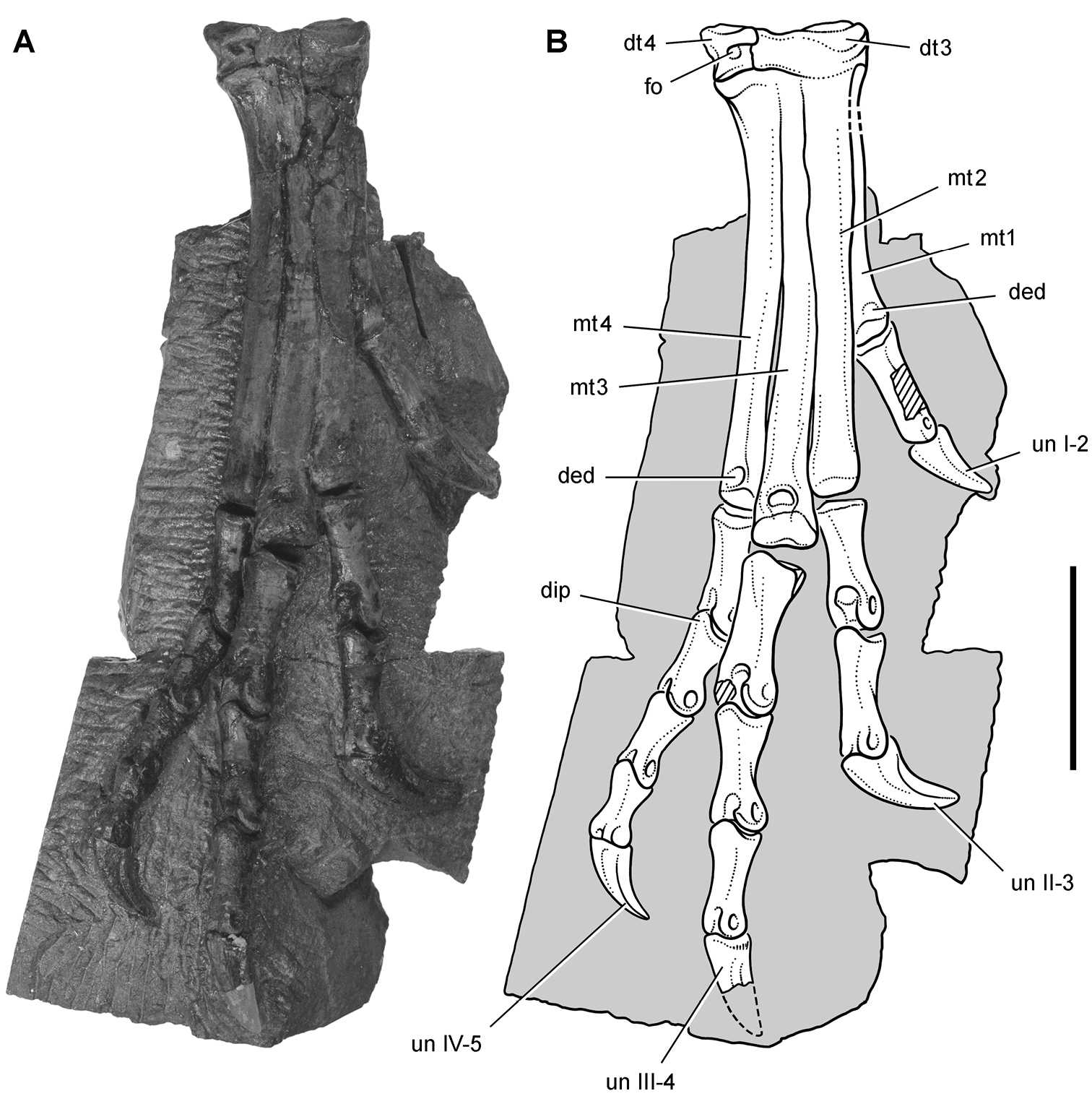
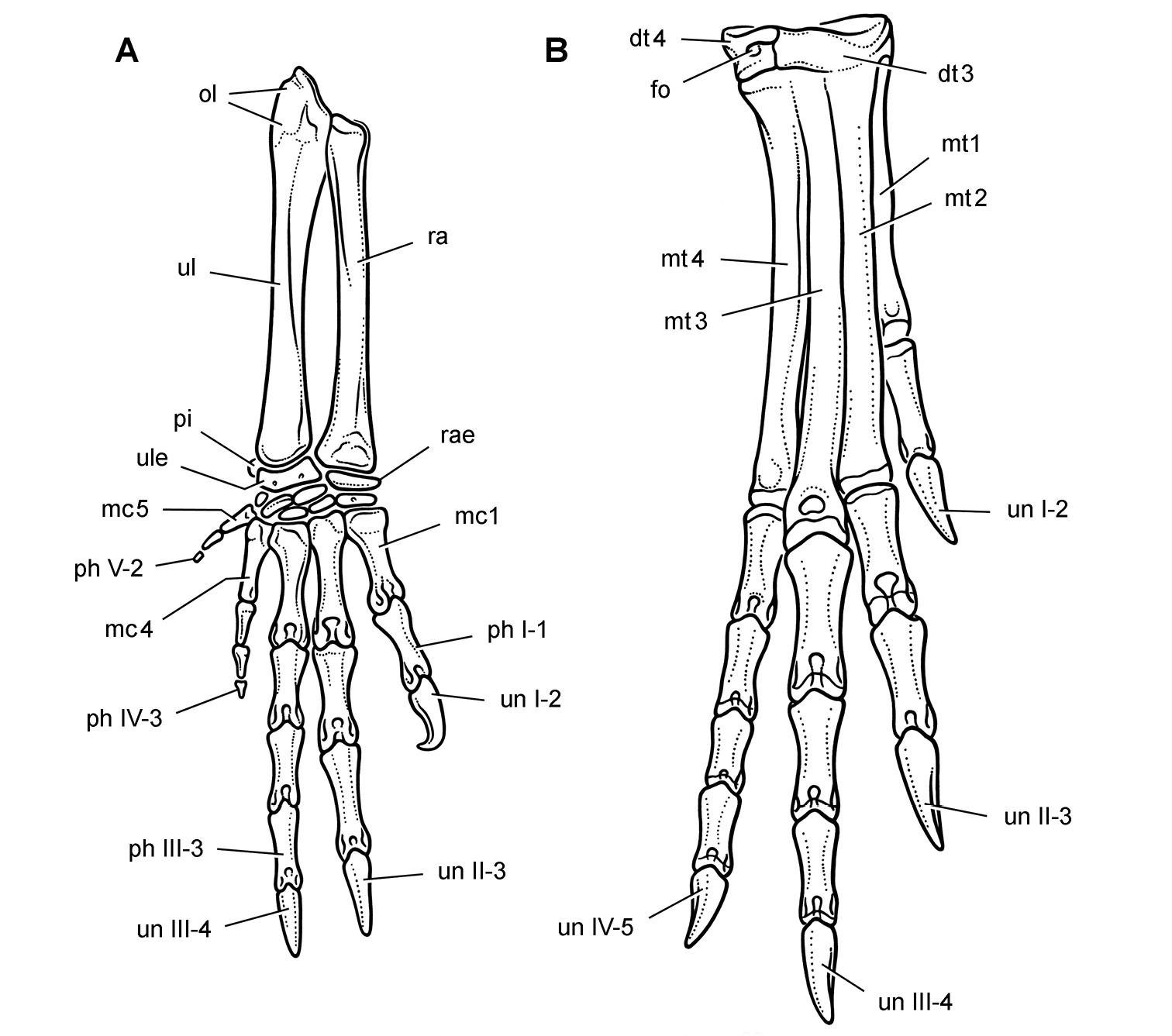
Photos and diagrams showing hand and foot bones of specimen SAM-PK-K1332

Although most researchers now consider Heterodontosaurus a bipedal runner, some earlier studies proposed a partial or fully quadrupedal locomotion. In 1980, Santa Luca described several features of the forelimb that are also present in recent quadrupedal animals and imply a strong arm musculature: These include a large olecranon (a bony eminence forming the uppermost part of the ulna), enlarging the lever arm of the forearm. The medial epicondyle of the humerus was enlarged, providing attachment sites for strong flexor muscles of the forearm. Furthermore, projections on the claws might have increased the forward thrust of the hand during walking. According to Santa Luca, Heterodontosaurus was quadrupedal when moving slowly but was able to switch to a much faster, bipedal run. The palaeontologists Teresa Maryańska and Halszka Osmólska supported Santa Luca's hypothesis in 1985; furthermore, they noted that the dorsal spine was strongly flexed downwards in the most completely known specimen. In 1987, Gregory S. Paul suggested that Heterodontosaurus might have been obligatorily quadrupedal, and that these animals would have galloped for fast locomotion. David Weishampel and Lawrence Witmer in 1990 as well as Norman and colleagues in 2004 argued in favour of exclusively bipedal locomotion, based on the morphology of the claws and shoulder girdle. The anatomical evidence suggested by Santa Luca was identified as adaptations for foraging; the robust and strong arms might have been used for digging up roots and breaking open insect nests.

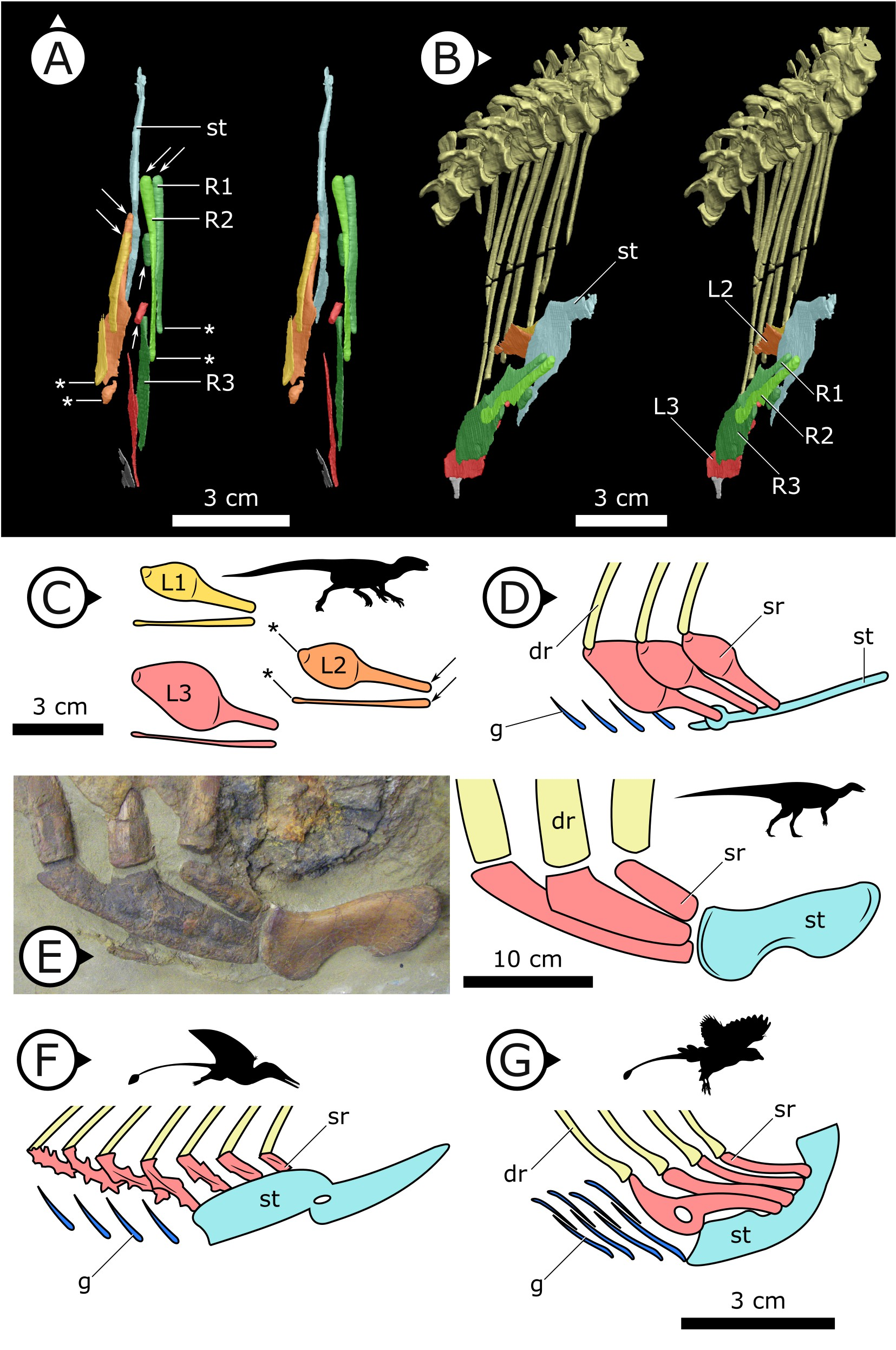
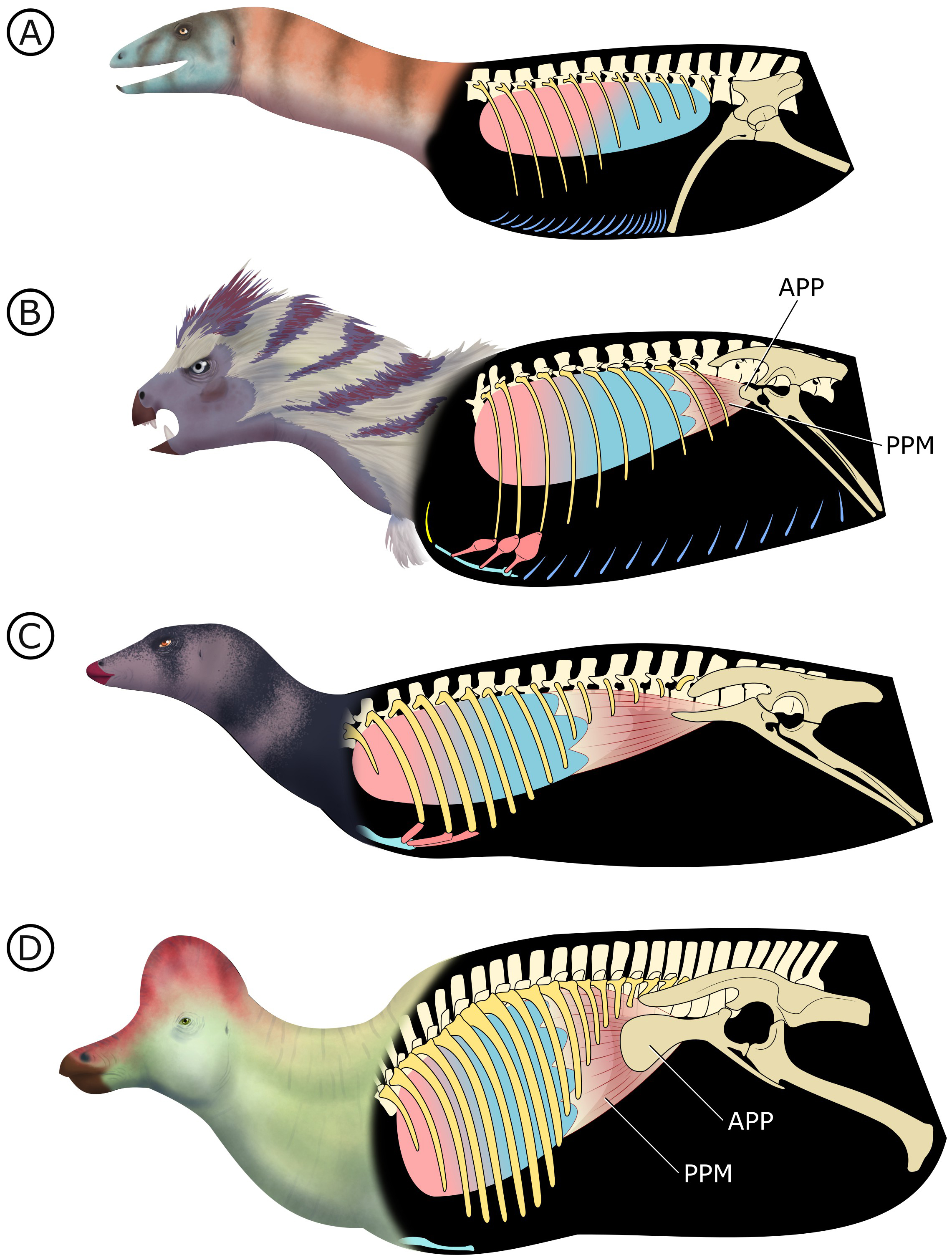
Comparison between the sternal ribs of ornithodirans (left) and hypothesised stepwise evolution of the ornithischian breathing apparatus (right)

Most studies consider dinosaurs as endothermic (warm-blooded) animals, with an elevated metabolism comparable to that of today's mammals and birds. In a 2009 study, Herman Pontzer and colleagues calculated the aerobic endurance of various dinosaurs. Even at moderate running speeds, Heterodontosaurus would have exceeded the maximum aerobic capabilities possible for an ectotherm (cold-blooded) animal, indicating endothermy in this genus.

Dinosaurs likely possessed an air sac system as found in modern birds, which ventilated an immobile lung. Air flow was generated by contraction of the chest, which was allowed by mobile sternal ribs and the presence of gastralia. Extensions of the air sacs also invaded bones, forming excavations and chambers, a condition known as postcranial skeletal pneumaticity. Ornithischians, with the exception of Heterodontosaurus, lacked mobile sternal ribs and gastralia, and all ornithischians (including Heterodontosaurus) lacked postcranial skeletal pneumaticity. Instead, ornithischians had a prominent anterior extension of the pubis, the anterior pubic process (APP), which was absent in other dinosaurs. Based on synchrotron data of a well-preserved Heterodontosaurus specimen (AM 4766), Viktor Radermacher and colleagues, in 2021, argued that the breathing system of ornithischians drastically differed from that of other dinosaurs, and that Heterodontosaurus represents an intermediate stage. According to these authors, ornithischians lost the ability to contract the chest for breathing, and instead relied on a muscle that ventilated the lung directly, which they termed the puberoperitoneal muscle. The APP of the pelvis would have provided the attachment site for this muscle. Heterodontosaurus had an incipient APP, and its gastralia were reduced compared to non-ornithischian dinosaurs, suggesting that the pelvis was already involved in breathing while chest contraction became less important.

=== Growth and proposed sexual dimorphism ===
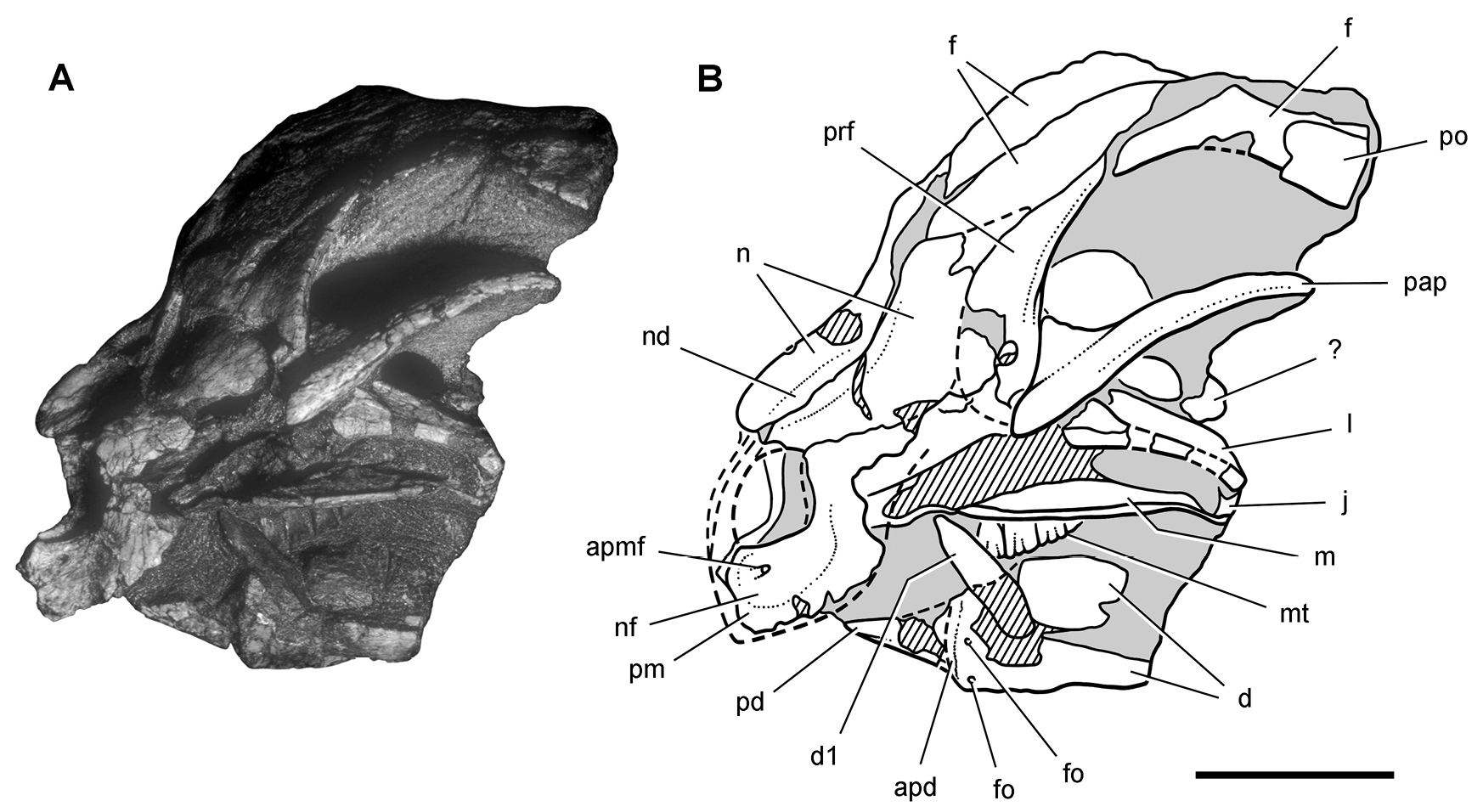
SAM-PK-K10487, a juvenile skull

The ontogeny, or the development of the individual from juvenile to adult, is poorly known for Heterodontosaurus, as juvenile specimens are scarce. As shown by the juvenile skull SAM-PK-K10487, the eye sockets became proportionally smaller as the animal grew, and the snout became longer and contained additional teeth. Similar changes have been reported for several other dinosaurs. The morphology of the teeth, however, did not change with age, indicating that the diet of juveniles was the same as that of adults. The length of the juvenile skull was suggested to be 45 mm (2 in). Assuming similar body proportions as adult individuals, the body length of this juvenile would have been 450 mm (18 in). Indeed, the individual probably would have been smaller, since juvenile animals in general show proportionally larger heads.

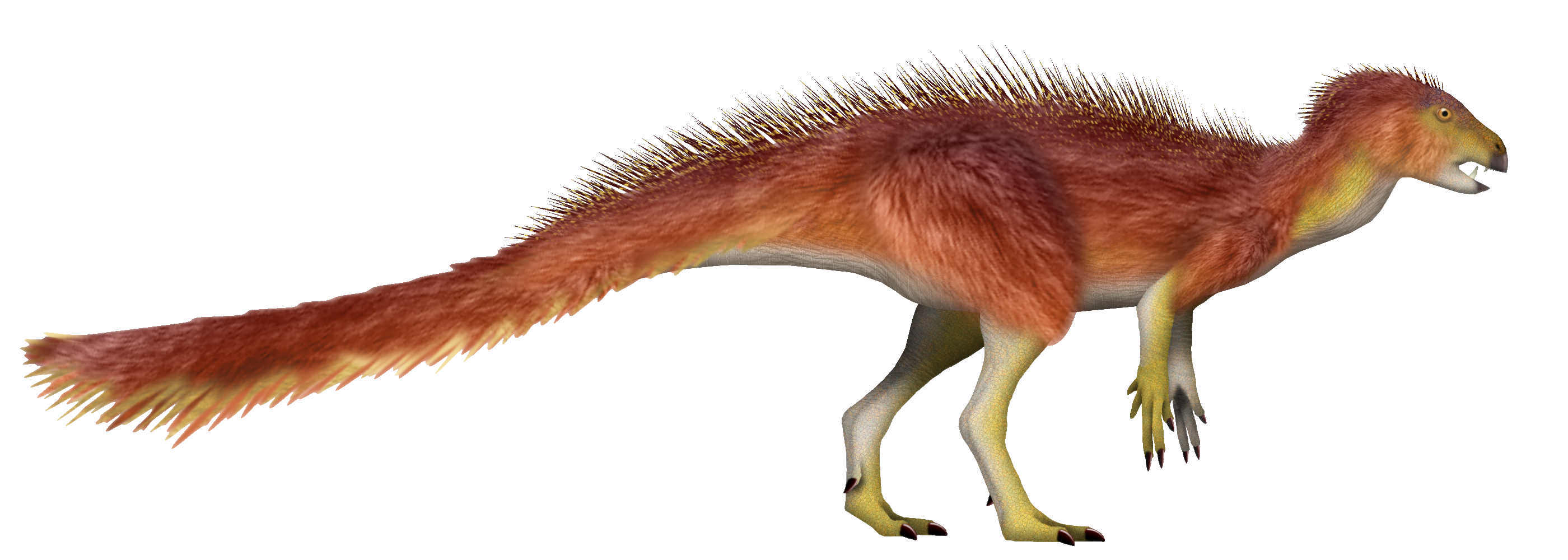
Life restoration showing exposed tusks

In 1974, Thulborn suggested that the large tusks of heterodontosaurids represented a secondary sex characteristic. According to this theory, only adult male individuals would have possessed fully developed tusks; the holotype specimen of the related Abrictosaurus, which lacked tusks altogether, would have represented a female. This hypothesis was questioned by palaeontologist Richard Butler and colleagues in 2006, who argued that the juvenile skull SAM-PK-K10487 possessed tusks despite its early developmental state. At this state, secondary sex characteristics are not expected. Furthermore, tusks are present in almost all known Heterodontosaurus skulls; the presence of sexual dimorphism however would suggest a 50:50 ratio between individuals bearing tusks and those lacking tusks. The only exception is the holotype specimen of Abrictosaurus; the lack of tusks in this individual is interpreted as a specialisation of this particular genus.

== Palaeoenvironment ==
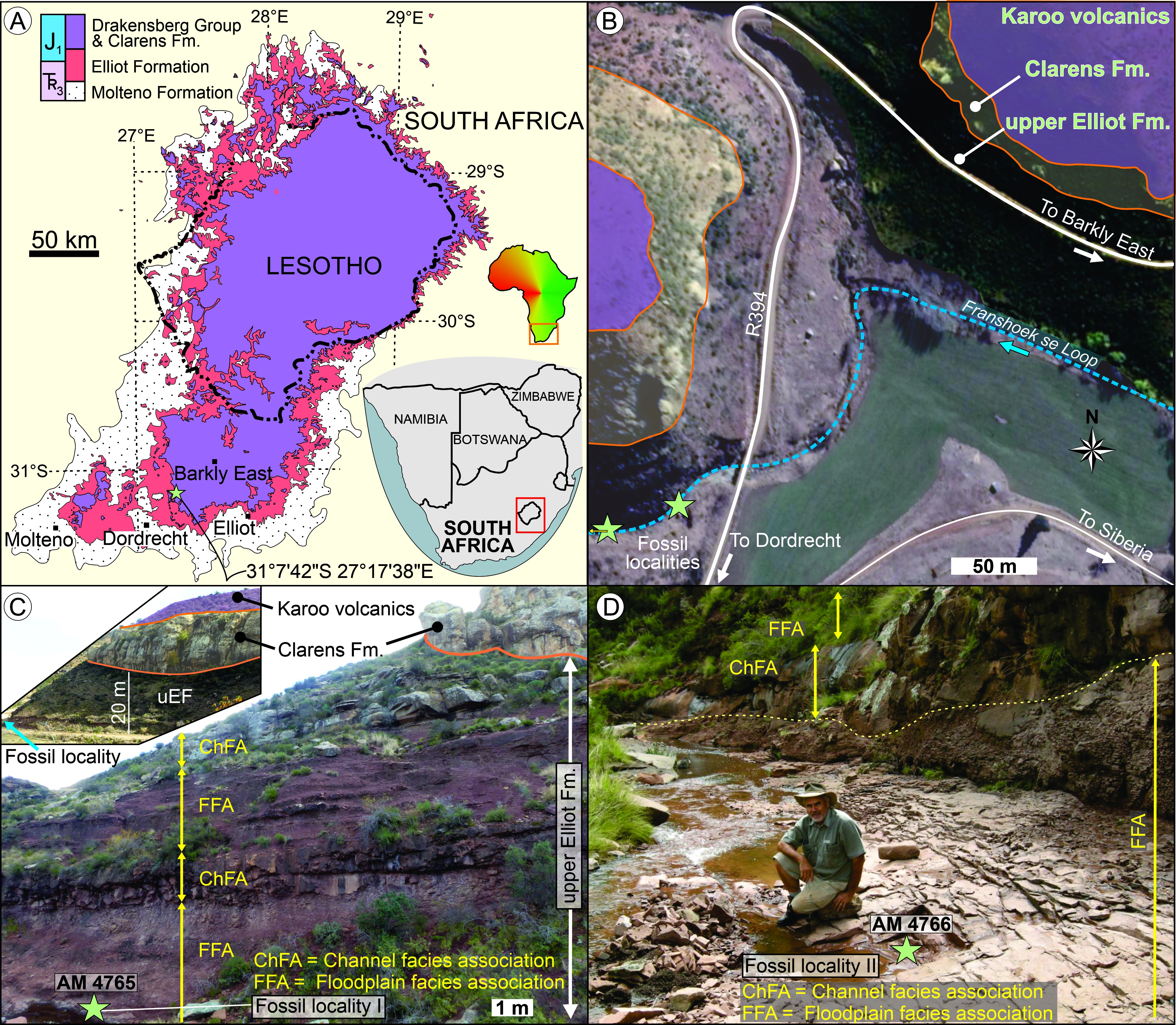
Stratigraphic context and locality maps of specimens AM 4766 and 65

Heterodontosaurus is known from fossils found in formations of the Karoo Supergroup, including the Upper Elliot Formation and the Clarens Formation, which date to the Hettangian and Sinemurian ages of the Lower Jurassic, around 200–190 million years ago. Originally, Heterodontosaurus was thought to be from the Upper Triassic period. The Upper Elliot Formation consists of red/purple mudstone and red/white sandstone, whereas the slightly younger Clarens Formation consists of white/cream-coloured sandstone. The Clarens Formation is less rich in fossils than the Upper Elliot Formation; its sediments also often form cliffs, restricting accessibility for fossil hunters. The Upper Elliot Formation is characterised by animals that appear to be more lightly built than those of the Lower Elliot Formation, which may have been an adaptation to the drier climate at this time in southern Africa. Both formations are famous for their abundant vertebrate fossils, including temnospondyl amphibians, turtles, lepidosaurs, aetosaurs, crocodylomorphs, and non-mammal cynodonts.

Other dinosaurs from these formations include the genasaur Lesothosaurus, the basal sauropodomorph Massospondylus, and the theropod Megapnosaurus. The Upper Elliot Formation shows the largest known heterodontosaurid diversity of any rock unit; besides Heterodontosaurus, it contained Lycorhinus, Abrictosaurus, and Pegomastax. Yet another member of the family, Geranosaurus, is known from the Clarens Formation. The high heterodontosaurid diversity have led researchers to conclude that different species might have fed on separate food sources in order to avoid competition (niche partitioning). With its highly specialised dentition, Heterodontosaurus might have been specialised for tough plant material, while the less specialised Abrictosaurus might have predominantly consumed softer vegetation. The position of the individual heterodontosaurid specimens within the rock succession is poorly known, making it difficult to determine how many of these species really were coeval, and which species existed at separate times.

== Works cited ==
- Sereno, P. C. (2012). "Taxonomy, morphology, masticatory function and phylogeny of heterodontosaurid dinosaurs". ZooKeys (226): 1–225. doi:10.3897/zookeys.226.2840. PMC 3491919. PMID 23166462.
