= Paratetrasauropus =

Trace fossil classification
- Domain: Eukaryota
- Kingdom: Animalia
- Phylum: Chordata
- Class: Reptilia
- Clade: Archosauria
- Clade: Pseudosuchia
- Clade: Crocodylomorpha
- Ichnogenus: †Paratetrasauropus; Ellenberger, 1972

Trace fossil

Paratetrasauropus is an ichnogenus of reptile footprint.

== See also ==
- List of dinosaur ichnogenera
