= List of African dinosaurs =

This is a list of non-avian dinosaurs whose remains have been recovered in Africa. Africa has a rich fossil record. It is rich in Triassic and Early Jurassic dinosaurs. African dinosaurs from these time periods include Megapnosaurus, Dracovenator, Melanorosaurus, Massospondylus, Euskelosaurus, Heterodontosaurus, Abrictosaurus, and Lesothosaurus. In the Middle Jurassic, the sauropods Atlasaurus, Chebsaurus, Jobaria, and Spinophorosaurus, flourished, as well as the theropod Afrovenator. The Late Jurassic is well represented in Africa, mainly thanks to the spectacular Tendaguru Formation in the Lindi Region of Tanzania. Veterupristisaurus, Ostafrikasaurus, Elaphrosaurus, Giraffatitan, Dicraeosaurus, Janenschia, Tornieria, Tendaguria, Kentrosaurus, and Dysalotosaurus are among the dinosaurs whose remains have been recovered from Tendaguru. This fauna seems to show strong similarities to that of the Morrison Formation in the United States and the Lourinha Formation in Portugal. For example, similar theropods, ornithopods and sauropods have been found in both the Tendaguru and the Morrison. This has important biogeographical implications.

The Early Cretaceous in Africa is known primarily from the northern part of the continent, particularly Niger. Suchomimus, Elrhazosaurus, Rebbachisaurus, Nigersaurus, Kryptops, Nqwebasaurus, and Paranthodon are some of the Early Cretaceous dinosaurs known from Africa. The Early Cretaceous was an important time for the dinosaurs of Africa because it was when Africa finally separated from South America, forming the South Atlantic Ocean. This was an important event because now the dinosaurs of Africa started developing endemism because of isolation. The Late Cretaceous of Africa is known mainly from North Africa. During the early part of the Late Cretaceous, North Africa was home to a rich dinosaur fauna. It includes Spinosaurus, Carcharodontosaurus, Rugops, Bahariasaurus, Deltadromeus, Paralititan, Aegyptosaurus, Tameryraptor, and Ouranosaurus. During the later parts of the Late Cretaceous, genera such as Angolatitan, Mansourasaurus, Ajnabia, Chenanisaurus, and Taleta flourished, especially in Morocco, as with the case of Ajnabia and Chenanisaurus.

== Criteria for inclusion ==
- The genus must appear on the List of dinosaur genera.
- At least one named species of the creature must have been found in Africa.

== List of African dinosaurs ==
=== Valid genera ===
Name	Year	Formation	Location	Notes	Images
Aardonyx	2010	Elliot Formation (Early Jurassic, Sinemurian)	South Africa	Primarily bipedal but also capable of quadrupedal locomotion	
Abrictosaurus	1975	Elliot Formation (Early Jurassic, Hettangian to Sinemurian)	Lesotho; South Africa	Known from two skulls, one of which possesses tusks, which may be an indication of sexual dimorphism	
Adratiklit	2020	El Mers Group (Middle Jurassic, Bathonian)	Morocco	One of the oldest known stegosaurs. Related to Late Jurassic European forms despite its early age	
Aegyptosaurus	1932	Bahariya Formation, Continental intercalaire?, Farak Formation? (Late Cretaceous, Cenomanian)	Egypt; Niger?	Its holotype specimen was destroyed in World War II	
Afromimus	2017	Elrhaz Formation (Early Cretaceous, Aptian to Albian)	Niger	Originally described as an African ornithomimosaur, but later redescribed as a possible noasaurid	
Afrovenator	1994	Tiourarén Formation (Middle Jurassic to Late Jurassic, Bathonian to Oxfordian)	Niger	Originally thought to hail from the Early Cretaceous	
Ajnabia	2021	Ouled Abdoun Basin (Late Cretaceous, Maastrichtian)	Morocco	The first hadrosaurid known from Africa. Closely related to European lambeosaurines	
Algoasaurus	1904	Kirkwood Formation (Early Cretaceous, Berriasian to Valanginian)	South Africa	Today known from only a few bones. Several more may have been made into bricks before they could be studied	
Angolatitan	2011	Itombe Formation (Late Cretaceous, Coniacian)	Angola	The first non-avian dinosaur described from Angola	
Antetonitrus	2003	Elliot Formation (Early Jurassic, Hettangian)	South Africa	Had weight-bearing adaptations in all its limbs, although its forelimbs retain adaptations for grasping	
Arcusaurus	2011	Elliot Formation (Early Jurassic, Pliensbachian)	South Africa	Combines traits of basal and advanced sauropodomorphs	
Atlasaurus	1999	Guettioua Formation (Middle Jurassic, Bathonian to Callovian)	Morocco	Possessed relatively elongated legs for a sauropod	
Australodocus	2007	Tendaguru Formation (Late Jurassic, Kimmeridgian to Tithonian)	Tanzania	Potentially an early euhelopodid	
Bahariasaurus	1934	Bahariya Formation, Farak Formation? (Late Cretaceous, Cenomanian)	Egypt; Niger?	Large but known from very few remains	
Berberosaurus	2007	Zawyat Ahançal Group (Early Jurassic, Toarcian)	Morocco	One of the oldest known ceratosaurs	
Blikanasaurus	1985	Elliot Formation (Late Triassic, Norian)	South Africa	A "hyper-robust" form that niche partitioned with other Late Triassic Elliot Formation sauropodomorphs	
Carcharodontosaurus	1931	Aïn el Guettar Formation?, Continental intercalaire, Echkar Formation, Elrhaz Formation?, Kem Kem Group, Wadi Milk Formation? (Late Cretaceous, Cenomanian)	Algeria; Morocco; Niger; Sudan? Tunisia?	One of the largest carnivorous dinosaurs. Two species are known	
Chebsaurus	2005	Aïssa Formation (Middle Jurassic, Callovian)	Algeria	Known from two juvenile specimens	
Chenanisaurus	2017	Ouled Abdoun Basin (Late Cretaceous, Maastrichtian)	Morocco	Potentially represents a lineage of abelisaurids endemic to Africa	
Cristatusaurus	1998	Elrhaz Formation (Early Cretaceous, Aptian to Albian)	Niger	Usually seen as a synonym of Suchomimus, although some studies consider it to be a valid genus	
Deltadromeus	1996	Kem Kem Group (Late Cretaceous, Cenomanian)	Morocco	Its precise phylogenetic position has been historically unstable, with multiple interpretations being suggested in the scientific literature	
Dicraeosaurus	1914	Tendaguru Formation (Late Jurassic, Kimmeridgian to Tithonian)	Tanzania	A short-necked, low-browsing sauropod. Two species are known	
Dracovenator	2005	Elliot Formation (Early Jurassic, Hettangian)	South Africa	Only known from fragments of a skull, but those are enough to tell that it was related to Dilophosaurus	
Dysalotosaurus	1919	Tendaguru Formation (Late Jurassic, Kimmeridgian)	Tanzania	Known from multiple remains that revealed much about its life history, diet and even disease	
Elaphrosaurus	1920	Tendaguru Formation (Late Jurassic, Kimmeridgian)	Tanzania	Possessed a relatively shallow chest for a medium-sized theropod	
Elrhazosaurus	2009	Elrhaz Formation (Early Cretaceous, Aptian)	Niger	Closely related to Valdosaurus	
Eocarcharia	2008	Elrhaz Formation (Early Cretaceous, Aptian to Albian)	Niger	Originally thought to be a carcharodontosaurid but later research found it to be chimeric, with the holotype postorbital and referred skull roof likely belonging to a spinosaurid closely related to the contemporaneous Suchomimus, and the referred maxilla belonging to a distinct carcharodontosaurid	
Eocursor	2007	Elliot Formation (Early Jurassic, Sinemurian)	South Africa	One of the most completely known early ornithischians	
Eucnemesaurus	1920	Elliot Formation (Late Triassic, Carnian to Norian)	South Africa	Some fossils assigned to this genus were originally interpreted as those of a giant herrerasaurid	
Euskelosaurus	1866	Elliot Formation (Late Triassic, Norian to Rhaetian)	Lesotho; South Africa; Zimbabwe	Originally thought to have been bow-legged	
Geranosaurus	1911	Clarens Formation (Early Jurassic, Pliensbachian to Toarcian)	South Africa	Poorly known but potentially a heterodontosaurid	
Giraffatitan	1988	Tendaguru Formation (Late Jurassic, Kimmeridgian to Tithonian)	Tanzania	Popularly associated with Brachiosaurus but several differences between the two have been noted	
Gryponyx	1911	Elliot Formation (Early Jurassic, Hettangian to Sinemurian)	South Africa	Although usually seen as a synonym of Massospondylus, at least one study has found it to be distantly related	
Heterodontosaurus	1962	Clarens Formation, Elliot Formation (Early Jurassic, Hettangian to Sinemurian)	South Africa	Possessed three types of teeth, including analogues of incisors and tusks, as well as a keratinous beak	
Igai	2023	Quseir Formation (Late Cretaceous, Campanian)	Egypt	More closely related to European titanosaurs than to southern African ones	
Ignavusaurus	2010	Elliot Formation (Early Jurassic, Hettangian)	Lesotho	Only known from a single, mostly articulated juvenile skeleton with a badly crushed skull	
Inosaurus	1960	Bahariya Formation?, Echkar Formation?, Tegama Group? (Early Cretaceous, Albian?)	Egypt? Niger	Very poorly known	
Iyuku	2022	Kirkwood Formation (Early Cretaceous, Valanginian)	South Africa	Uniquely known from an assemblage of mostly hatchling and juvenile fossils	
Janenschia	1991	Tendaguru Formation (Late Jurassic, Kimmeridgian to Tithonian)	Tanzania	Potentially a close relative of Bellusaurus, Haestasaurus and Tehuelchesaurus, all of which may form a unique clade of eusauropods with possible turiasaur affinities	
Jobaria	1999	Tiourarén Formation (Middle Jurassic to Late Jurassic, Bathonian to Oxfordian)	Niger	Known from an almost complete skeleton	
Kangnasaurus	1915	Kalahari Deposits Formation (Early Cretaceous, Aptian)	South Africa	Comparisons have been made with dryosaurids but at least two studies suggest a position within Elasmaria	
Karongasaurus	2005	Dinosaur Beds (Early Cretaceous, Aptian)	Malawi	Described from only a mandible and isolated teeth	
Kentrosaurus	1915	Tendaguru Formation (Late Jurassic, Kimmeridgian to Tithonian)	Tanzania	Possessed two rows of plates that gradually transitioned into spikes towards the tail, as well as a long spike on each shoulder	
Kholumolumo	2020	Elliot Formation (Late Triassic, Norian)	Lesotho	Before its formal description, it had been informally referred to as "Kholumolumosaurus" and "Thotobolosaurus". The latter name means "trash heap lizard" in Sesotho, referring to how the holotype was originally found close to a trash heap	
Kryptops	2008	Elrhaz Formation (Early Cretaceous, Aptian to Albian)	Niger	Postcranial remains referred to this genus have been later found to come from an allosauroid, perhaps a metriacanthosaurid	
Ledumahadi	2018	Elliot Formation (Early Jurassic, Hettangian to Sinemurian)	South Africa	One of the largest Early Jurassic dinosaurs, estimated as weighing 12 tonnes (26,000 lb) despite lacking columnar limbs like later sauropods	
Lesothosaurus	1978	Clarens Formation, Elliot Formation (Early Jurassic, Hettangian to Sinemurian)	Lesotho; South Africa	Possibly an opportunistic omnivore, feeding on meat during seasons when plants are not available	
Lurdusaurus	1999	Elrhaz Formation (Early Cretaceous, Aptian to Albian)	Niger	The proportions of its body and limbs suggest it may have been a semiaquatic herbivore similar to a hippopotamus	
Lycorhinus	1924	Elliot Formation (Early Jurassic, Hettangian to Sinemurian)	South Africa	Originally misidentified as a cynodont	
Malawisaurus	1993	Dinosaur Beds (Early Cretaceous, Aptian)	Malawi	Known from abundant material, including elements from the skull and osteoderms, but they may not represent a single taxon	
Mansourasaurus	2018	Quseir Formation (Late Cretaceous, Campanian)	Egypt	One of the few Late Cretaceous sauropods known from Africa	
Massospondylus	1854	Bushveld Sandstone, Clarens Formation, Elliot Formation, Forest Sandstone (Early Jurassic, Hettangian to Pliensbachian)	Lesotho; South Africa; Zimbabwe	Abundant remains have been discovered. Several specimens were once assigned to their own genera and species	
Mbiresaurus	2022	Pebbly Arkose Formation (Late Triassic, Carnian)	Zimbabwe	One of the oldest dinosaurs known from Africa. Its discovery proves that the earliest dinosaurs were restricted to high latitudes	
Melanorosaurus	1924	Elliot Formation (Late Triassic, Norian)	South Africa	A robust, quadrupedal herbivore. Some specimens assigned to this genus may not represent the same taxon	
Meroktenos	2016	Elliot Formation (Late Triassic, Norian to Rhaetian)	Lesotho	Its femur was unusually robust for an animal of its size	
Minqaria	2024	Ouled Abdoun Basin (Late Cretaceous, Maastrichtian)	Morocco	Known from a partial skull	
Mnyamawamtuka	2019	Galula Formation (Early Cretaceous to Late Cretaceous, Aptian to Cenomanian)	Tanzania	Its specific name, moyowamkia, is Kiswahili for "heart tail", which references the heart-shaped cross-section of its caudal vertebrae	
Musango	2026	Pebbly Arkose Formation (Late Triassic, Norian)	Zimbabwe	Together with the contemporary Musankwa, it represents an African radiation of unaysaurids	
Musankwa	2024	Pebbly Arkose Formation (Late Triassic, Norian)	Zimbabwe	The fourth dinosaur genus to be named from Zimbabwe	
Ngwevu	2019	Clarens Formation (Early Jurassic, Pliensbachian to Toarcian)	South Africa	Known from a skull originally assigned to Massospondylus. It was assigned to its own genus based on its unique proportions	
Nigersaurus	1999	Elrhaz Formation (Early Cretaceous, Aptian to Albian)	Niger	All of its teeth were at the front of its jaws, which were wider than the rest of its skull, an adaptation to low browsing	
Nqwebasaurus	2000	Kirkwood Formation (Early Cretaceous, Berriasian)	South Africa	The first non-avian coelurosaur named from mainland Africa	
Nyana	2026	Elliot Formation (Late Triassic, Norian to Rhaetian)	South Africa	Known from the partial skeleton of a young but large individual	
Orosaurus	1867	Elliot Formation? (Late Triassic, Norian to Rhaetian)	South Africa	Probably a synonym of Euskelosaurus	
Ostafrikasaurus	2012	Tendaguru Formation (Late Jurassic, Tithonian)	Tanzania	Described from a single tooth as an early spinosaurid but ceratosaurid affinities have also been proposed	
Ouranosaurus	1976	Elrhaz Formation (Early Cretaceous, Aptian)	Niger	Had long neural spines that projected from its vertebrae, which may have supported a sail or hump in life	
Paralititan	2001	Bahariya Formation (Late Cretaceous, Cenomanian)	Egypt	Would have lived in a tidal flat environment dominated by mangroves	
Paranthodon	1929	Kirkwood Formation (Early Cretaceous, Berriasian to Valanginian)	South Africa	Although only known from fragmentary specimens, they are enough to tell that it was a stegosaur	
Pegomastax	2012	Elliot Formation (Early Jurassic, Sinemurian)	South Africa	The morphology of its jaws and beak suggests a diet of tough plants	
Phosphatotitan	2026	Ouled Abdoun Basin (Late Cretaceous, Maastrichtian)	Morocco	A close relative of Argentinosaurus and Patagotitan, together forming the clade Argentinosauridae	
Plateosauravus	1932	Elliot Formation (Late Triassic, Norian)	South Africa	Known from multiple specimens, including those of juveniles	
Pulanesaura	2015	Elliot Formation (Early Jurassic, Hettangian to Sinemurian)	South Africa	A low browser that lacked the extremely long neck of later sauropods	
Rebbachisaurus	1954	Kem Kem Group (Late Cretaceous, Cenomanian)	Morocco	Carried a row of elongated neural spines, which would have supported a ridge or low sail on its back	
Rugops	2004	Echkar Formation (Late Cretaceous, Cenomanian)	Niger	Preserves two rows of holes on the top of its skull, which may have anchored a display structure or an armor-like dermis	
Rukwatitan	2014	Galula Formation (Early Cretaceous to Late Cretaceous, Albian to Cenomanian)	Tanzania	One of the few titanosaurs known from central Africa, filling in a gap in their evolutionary history	
Sauroniops	2013	Kem Kem Group (Late Cretaceous, Cenomanian)	Morocco	Only known from a single, thickened frontal. Suggested to be a synonym of Carcharodontosaurus but this has been refuted	
Sefapanosaurus	2015	Elliot Formation (Early Jurassic, Hettangian)	South Africa	Had a distinctive cross-shaped astragalus	
Shingopana	2017	Galula Formation (Late Cretaceous, Campanian to Maastrichtian)	Tanzania	Most closely related to South American titanosaurs	
Spicomellus	2021	El Mers Group (Middle Jurassic, Bathonian)	Morocco	The oldest ankylosaur known and the first one from Africa. Uniquely, its osteoderms were fused directly to its ribs and had very long spikes in its neck and pelvis	
Spinophorosaurus	2009	Irhazer Shale (Middle Jurassic, Bajocian to Bathonian)	Niger	Originally described as possessing a "thagomizer" similar to those of stegosaurs, but these turned out to be misidentified clavicles. A high browser with tall shoulders and an elevated neck	
Spinosaurus	1915	Aïn el Guettar Formation?, Bahariya Formation, Farak Formation, Kem Kem Group (Late Cretaceous, Cenomanian)	Algeria; Egypt; Morocco; Niger; Tunisia?	Possessed a myriad of features that have been suggested to be evidence of a semiaquatic lifestyle, including webbed feet and a paddle-like tail. However, it is debated if it was a marine piscivore or a shoreline generalist	
Spinostropheus	2004	Tiourarén Formation (Middle Jurassic to Late Jurassic, Bathonian to Oxfordian)	Niger	Although often considered a close relative of Elaphrosaurus, these inferences are based on a specimen that cannot actually be referred to this genus	
Suchomimus	1998	Elrhaz Formation (Early Cretaceous, Barremian to Albian)	Niger	Similar to Baryonyx but with a low sail on its back	
Taleta	2025	Ouled Abdoun Basin (Late Cretaceous, Maastrichtian)	Morocco	Closely related to and contemporary with Ajnabia and Minqaria	
Tameryraptor	2025	Bahariya Formation (Late Cretaceous, Cenomanian)	Egypt	Based on destroyed fossils originally referred to Carcharodontosaurus	
Tataouinea	2013	Aïn el Guettar Formation (Early Cretaceous, Albian)	Tunisia	Its bones were extensively pneumatized, supporting the theory that sauropods had bird-like respiratory systems	
Tazoudasaurus	2004	Zawyat Ahançal Group (Early Jurassic, Toarcian)	Morocco	One of the few Early Jurassic sauropods known from reasonably complete remains	
Tendaguria	2000	Tendaguru Formation (Late Jurassic, Tithonian)	Tanzania	The first definitive turiasaur known from Africa	
Thyreosaurus	2024	El Mers Group (Middle Jurassic, Bathonian)	Morocco	May have possessed a recumbent dermal armor, an unusual feature among stegosaurs	
Tornieria	1911	Tendaguru Formation (Late Jurassic, Kimmeridgian to Tithonian)	Tanzania	Has been assigned to different genera throughout its history	
Veterupristisaurus	2011	Tendaguru Formation (Late Jurassic, Kimmeridgian to Tithonian)	Tanzania	Known from a few vertebrae somewhat similar to those of Acrocanthosaurus	
Vulcanodon	1972	Forest Sandstone (Early Jurassic, Sinemurian to Pliensbachian)	Zimbabwe	Theropod teeth were found associated with the holotype	
Wamweracaudia	2019	Tendaguru Formation (Late Jurassic, Tithonian)	Tanzania	The first definitive mamenchisaurid known from outside Asia	

=== Invalid and potentially valid genera ===
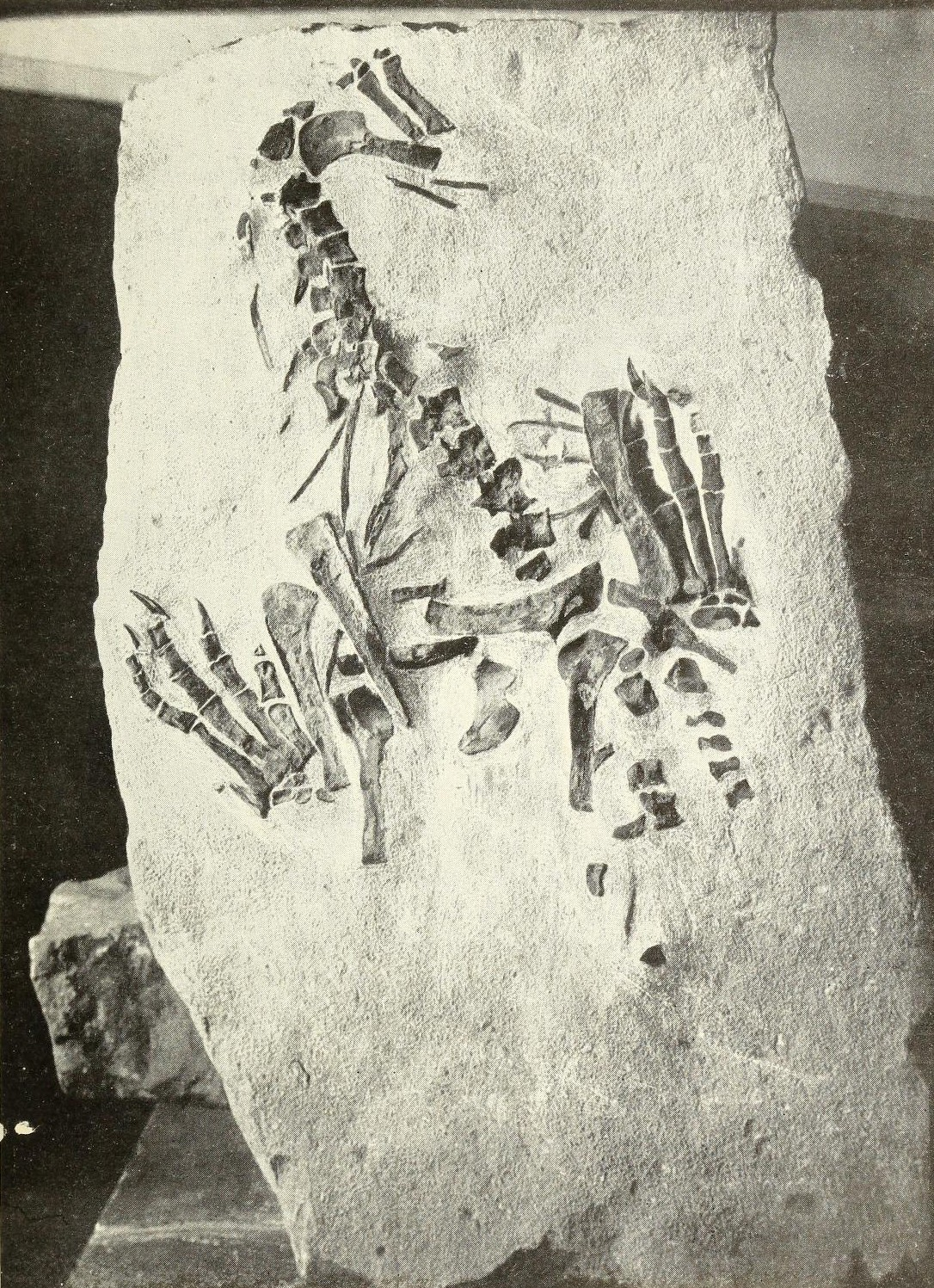
Aristosaurus

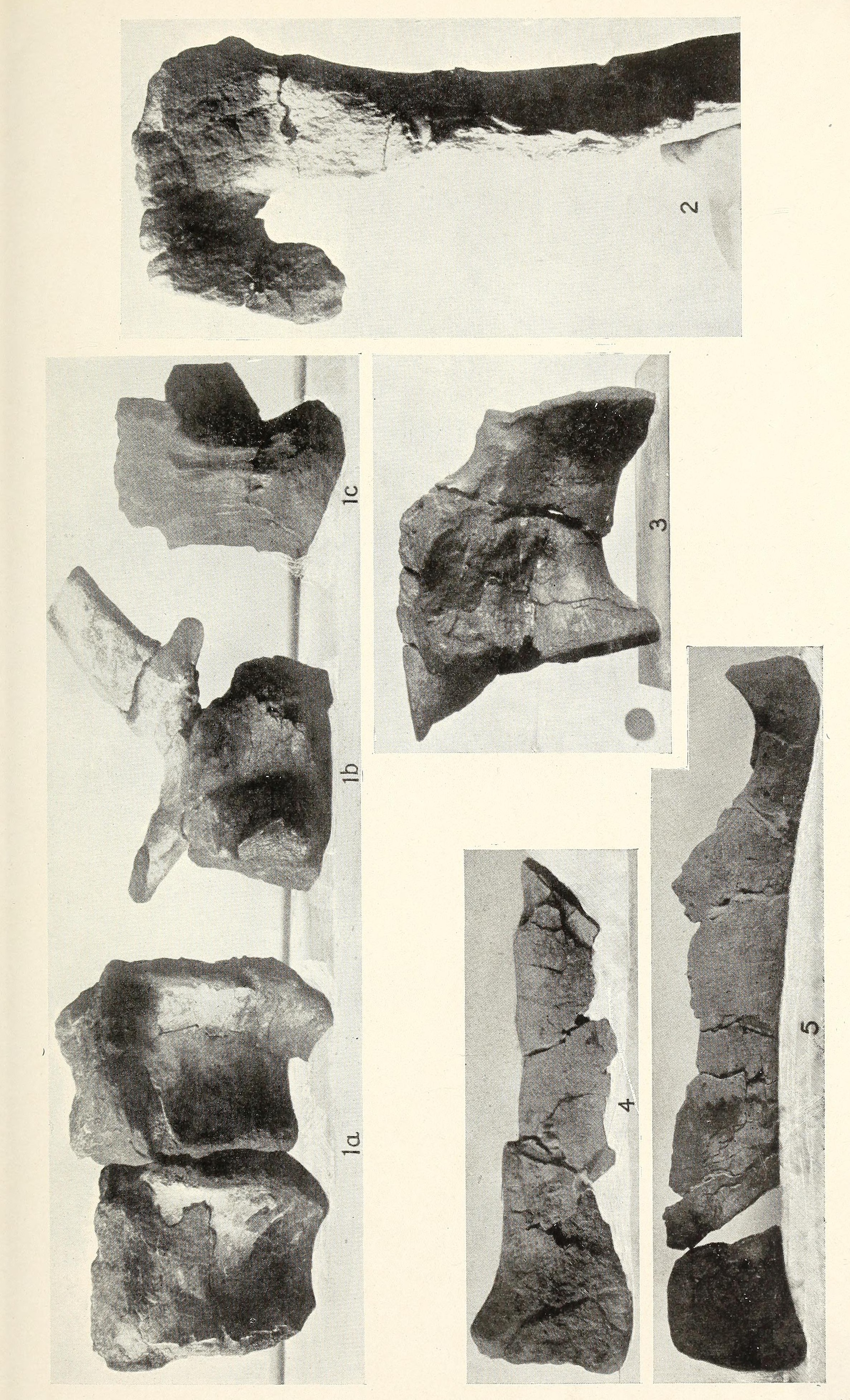
Dromicosaurus

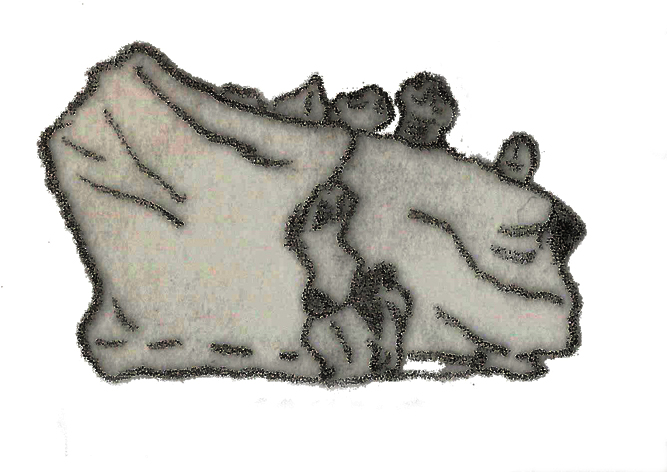
Fabrosaurus

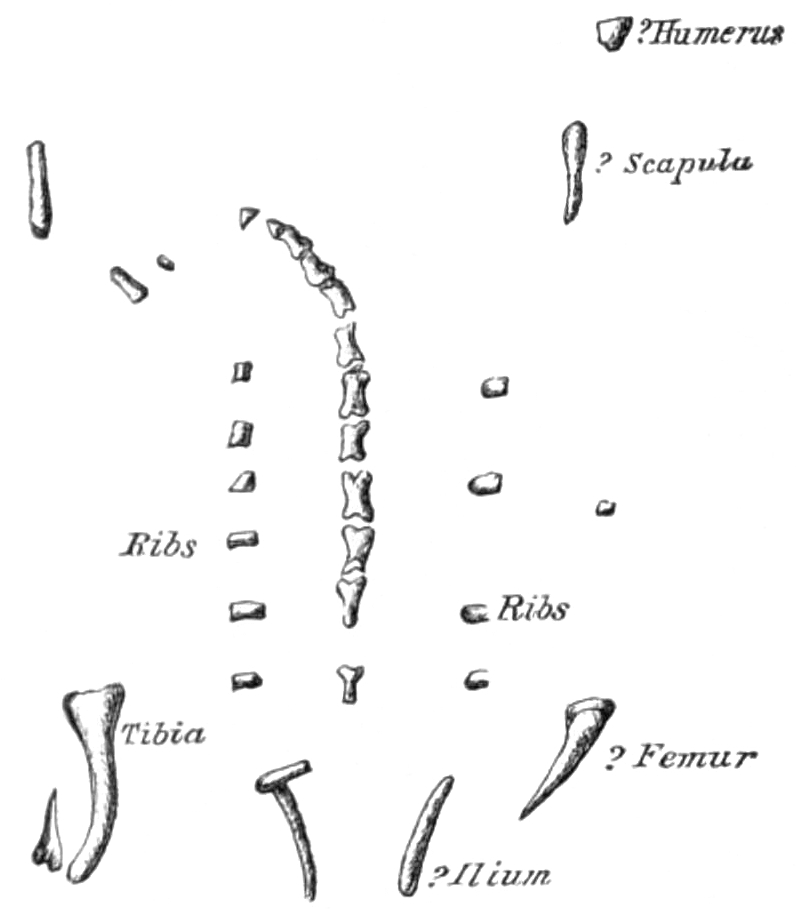
Hortalotarsus

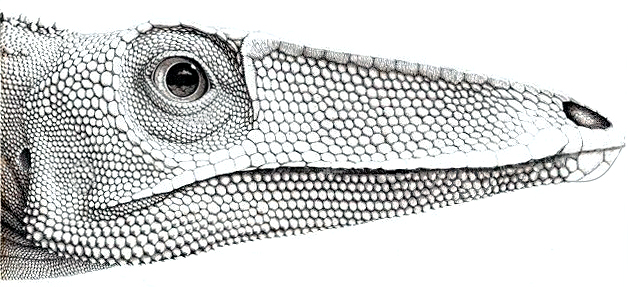
Megapnosaurus

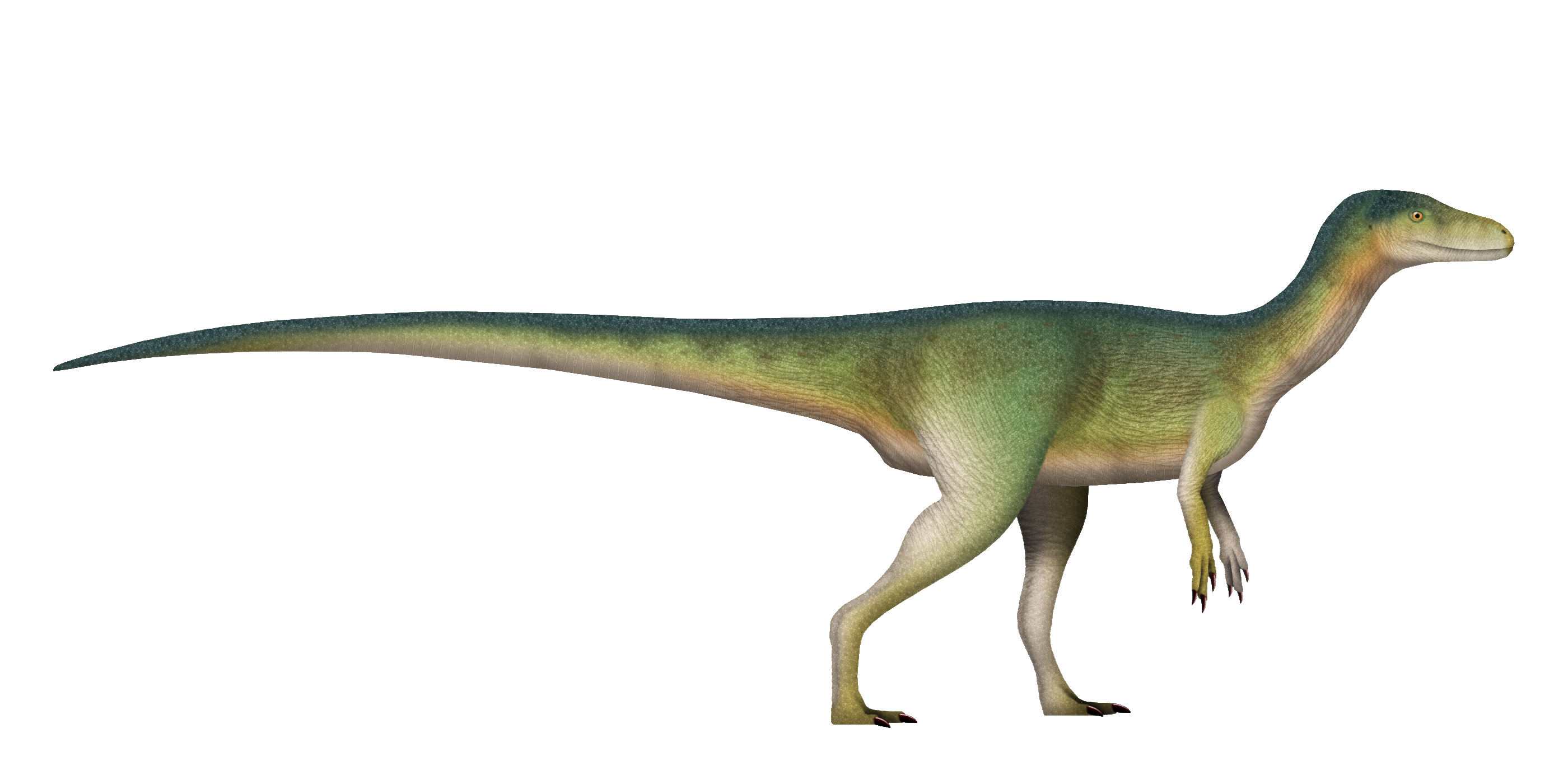
Nyasasaurus

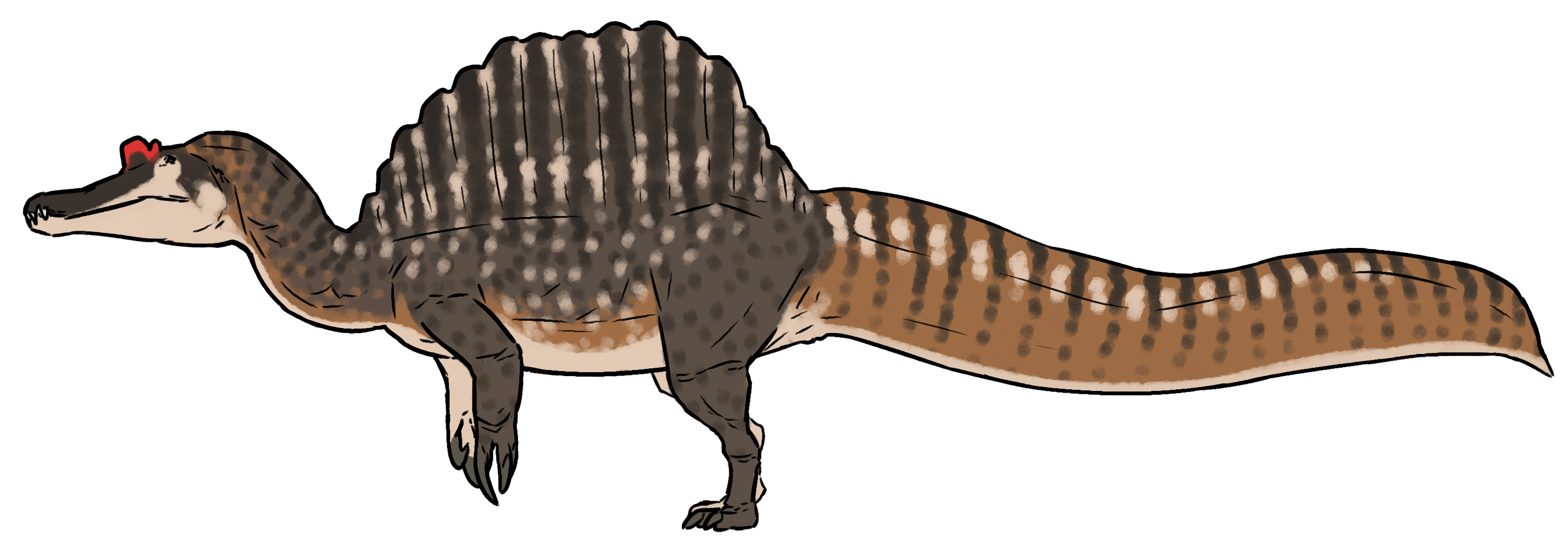
Sigilmassasaurus
- Aetonyx palustris: Considered a potential junior synonym of Massospondylus, but two more recent studies cast doubt on this.
- Aristosaurus erectus: Believed to be a synonym of Massospondylus, though this genus was found to be indeterminate by later research.
- Dromicosaurus gracilis: Usually considered synonymous with Massospondylus although it was later suggested to be an indeterminate sauropodomorph.
- Fabrosaurus australis: Sometimes considered to be part of a family of small ornithischians called fabrosaurids. It may potentially be a synonym of Lesothosaurus.
- Gigantoscelus molengraafi: Probably a synonym of Euskelosaurus, but this cannot be confirmed.
- Gyposaurus: The African species, G. capensis, may be a juvenile Massospondylus. A Chinese species has also been named, but it may not belong to this genus.
- Hortalotarsus skirtopodus: A possible synonym of Massospondylus.
- "Likhoelesaurus": Suggested to be a giant, early carnosaur but might actually be a pseudosuchian.
- Megapnosaurus: The African species, M. rhodesiensis, might belong to the genus Coelophysis. Another referred species, M. kayentakatae, probably needs its own genus name, as the current one, "Syntarsus", is preoccupied by an insect.
- Nyasasaurus parringtoni: Described in 2013 as the oldest known dinosaur, dating back to the Anisian, but both this date and its classification have been questioned.
- Sigilmassasaurus brevicollis: A spinosaurid contemporary with Spinosaurus. Its status as a distinct genus and/or species is uncertain.
- Torvosaurus: Teeth originally named as Megalosaurus ingens have been reassigned to this genus, but not as a distinct species.

== Timeline ==
This is a timeline of selected dinosaurs from the list above. Time is measured in mya along the x-axis.

== See also ==
- List of African birds
