= 1920 in paleontology =

List of years in paleontology	(table)
- … 1910; 1911; 1912; 1913; 1914; 1915; 1916; 1917; 1918; 1919; 1920; 1921; 1922; 1923; 1924; 1925; 1926; 1927; 1928; 1929; 1930 …
- In science 1917 1918 1919 1920 1921 1922 1923
- Art; Archaeology; Architecture; Literature; Music; Philosophy; Science; +...

Paleontology or palaeontology is the study of prehistoric life forms on Earth through the examination of plant and animal fossils. This includes the study of body fossils, tracks (ichnites), burrows, cast-off parts, fossilised feces (coprolites), palynomorphs and chemical residues. Because humans have encountered fossils for millennia, paleontology has a long history both before and after becoming formalized as a science. This article records significant discoveries and events related to paleontology that occurred or were published in the year 1920.

== Arthropods ==
=== Newly named insects ===
Name	Novelty	Status	Authors	Age	Unit	Location	Notes	Images
Dolichoderus vectensis	Sp nov	valid	Donisthorpe	Late Eocene	Bembridge Marls	England	A dolichoderine ant	Dolichoderus vectensis
Emplastus emeryi	Sp nov	jr synonym	Donisthorpe	Late Eocene	Bembridge Marls	England	A dolichoderine ant jr synonym of Emplastus britannicus	Emplastus britannicus ("E. emeryi" holotype)
Dolichoderus gurnetensis	Sp nov	jr synonym	Donisthorpe	Late Eocene	Bembridge Marls	England	A dolichoderine ant jr synonym of Emplastus gurnetensis	E. gurnetensis queen

== Archosauromorphs ==
=== Crocodilians ===
==== New taxa ====
Taxon	Novelty	Status	Author(s)	Age	Unit	Location	Notes	Images
Tomistoma dowsoni	Sp. nov	Valid	Fourtau	Burdigalian	Moghra Formation	Egypt	A member of the Gavialoidea. It was later placed in a distinct genus, Sutekhsuchus, by Burke et al. in 2024.	

=== Dinosaurs ===
==== New taxa ====
Taxon	Novelty	Status	Author(s)	Age	Unit	Location	Notes	Images
Aristosaurus	Gen. et sp. nov.	Nomen dubium	van Hoepen	Pliensbachian	Clarens Formation	South Africa	A prosauropod sometimes synonymized with Massospondylus	
Dromicosaurus	Gen. et sp. nov.	Nomen dubium	van Hoepen	Late Triassic-Early Jurassic	Elliot Formation	South Africa	A prosauropod sometimes synonymized with Massospondylus	
Elaphrosaurus	Gen. et sp. nov.	Valid	Janensch	Kimmeridgian	Tendaguru Formation	Tanzania	A slender theropod	
Eucnemesaurus	Gen. et sp. nov.	Valid	van Hoepen	Norian	Elliot Formation	South Africa	A prosauropod	
Kritosaurus incurvimanus	Sp. nov.	Valid	Parks	Campanian	Dinosaur Park Formation	Canada; Alberta	A species of Kritosaurus	
Procheneosaurus	Gen. nov.?	Jr. synonym	Matthew	Campanian	Dinosaur Park Formation	Canada; Alberta	A genus lacking a species name, sometimes considered a nomen nudum. A synonym of Lambeosaurus	

== Synapsids ==
=== Non-mammalian ===
Name	Status	Authors	Age	Location	Notes	Images
Alopecopsis	Valid	Broom	257 Millions of years ago.	South Africa		
Broomisaurus	Valid	Joleaud				
Moschorhinus	Valid	Broom	250 Millions of years ago.	South Africa		Moschorhinus
Protacmon	Valid	Watson	245 Millions of years ago.	South Africa		
