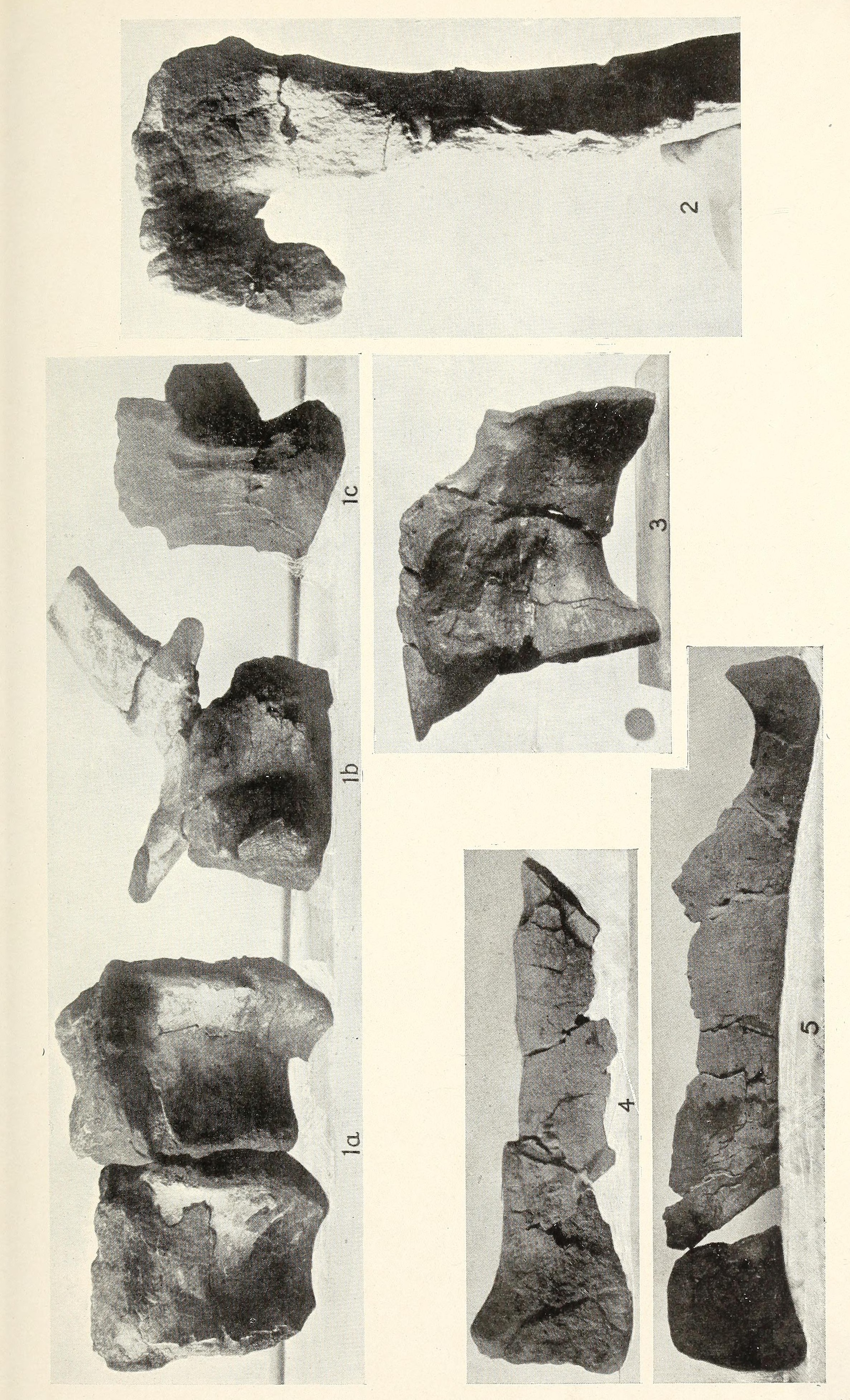
- Parts of the type specimen: Left pubis (top), tail vertebrae (left), back vertebra (middle right), and right pubis (bottom right)

Scientific classification
- Domain: Eukaryota
- Kingdom: Animalia
- Phylum: Chordata
- Clade: Dracohors
- Clade: Dinosauria
- Clade: Saurischia
- Clade: †Sauropodomorpha
- Genus: †Dromicosaurus van Hoepen, 1920

Species
- †D. gracilis van Hoepen, 1920

= Dromicosaurus =

Dromicosaurus Temporal range: Late Triassic or Early Jurassic 227.3–184.2 Ma

Dubious dinosaur genus from South Africa

Dromicosaurus is a dubious genus of sauropodomorph dinosaur from the Late Triassic or Early Jurassic of South Africa. Its only species is D. gracilis. Dromicosaurus was named by Egbert Cornelis Nicolaas van Hoepen in 1920 from a fragmentary skeleton he had discovered in the Elliot Formation in Free State. The name, lit. 'quick-walking lizard', alludes to the slender legs compared to related genera such as Eucnemesaurus. Dromicosaurus has repeatedly been considered as a synonym of a species of Massospondylus, but was considered an indeterminate sauropodomorph in the two most recent reviews.

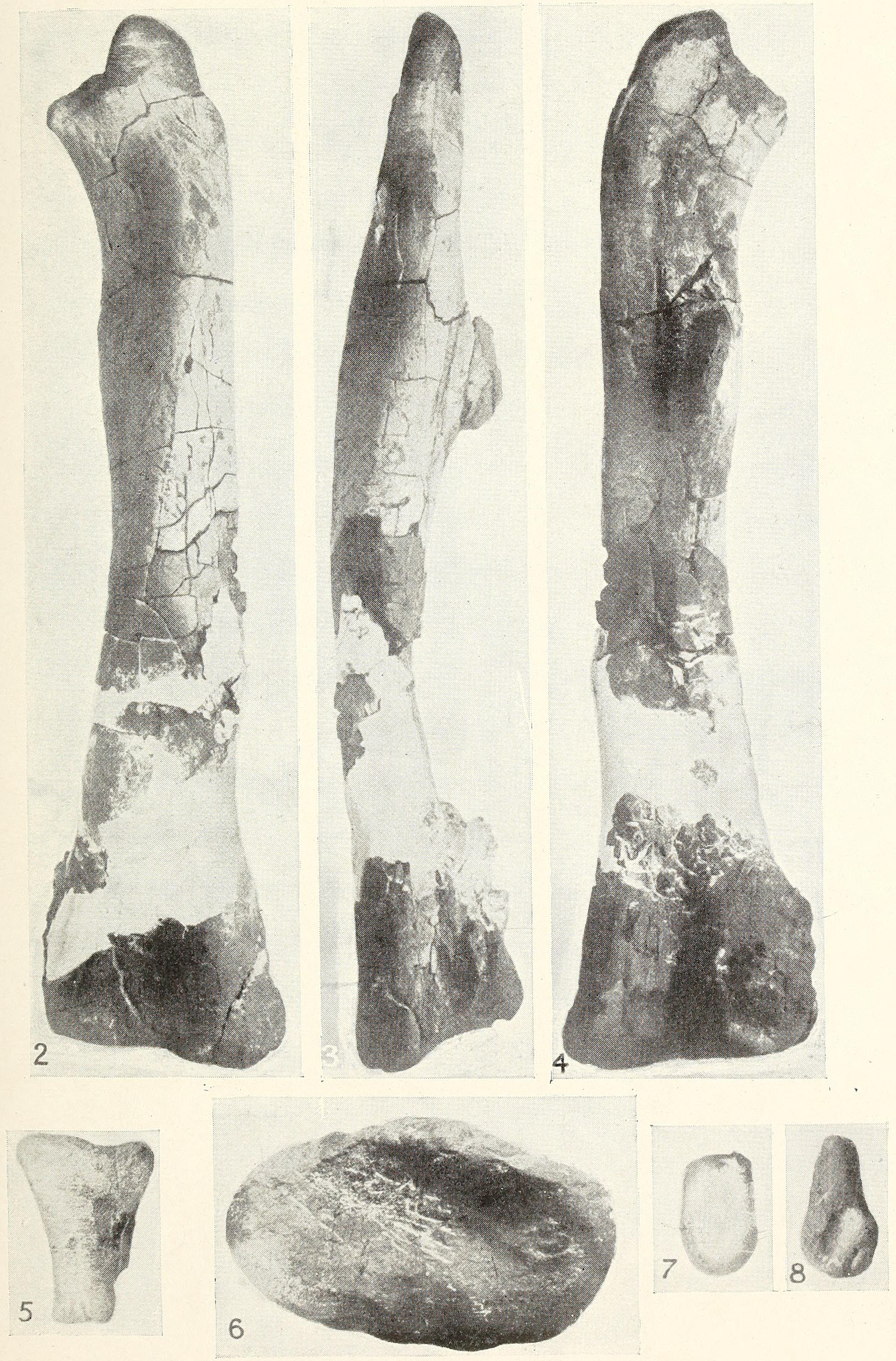
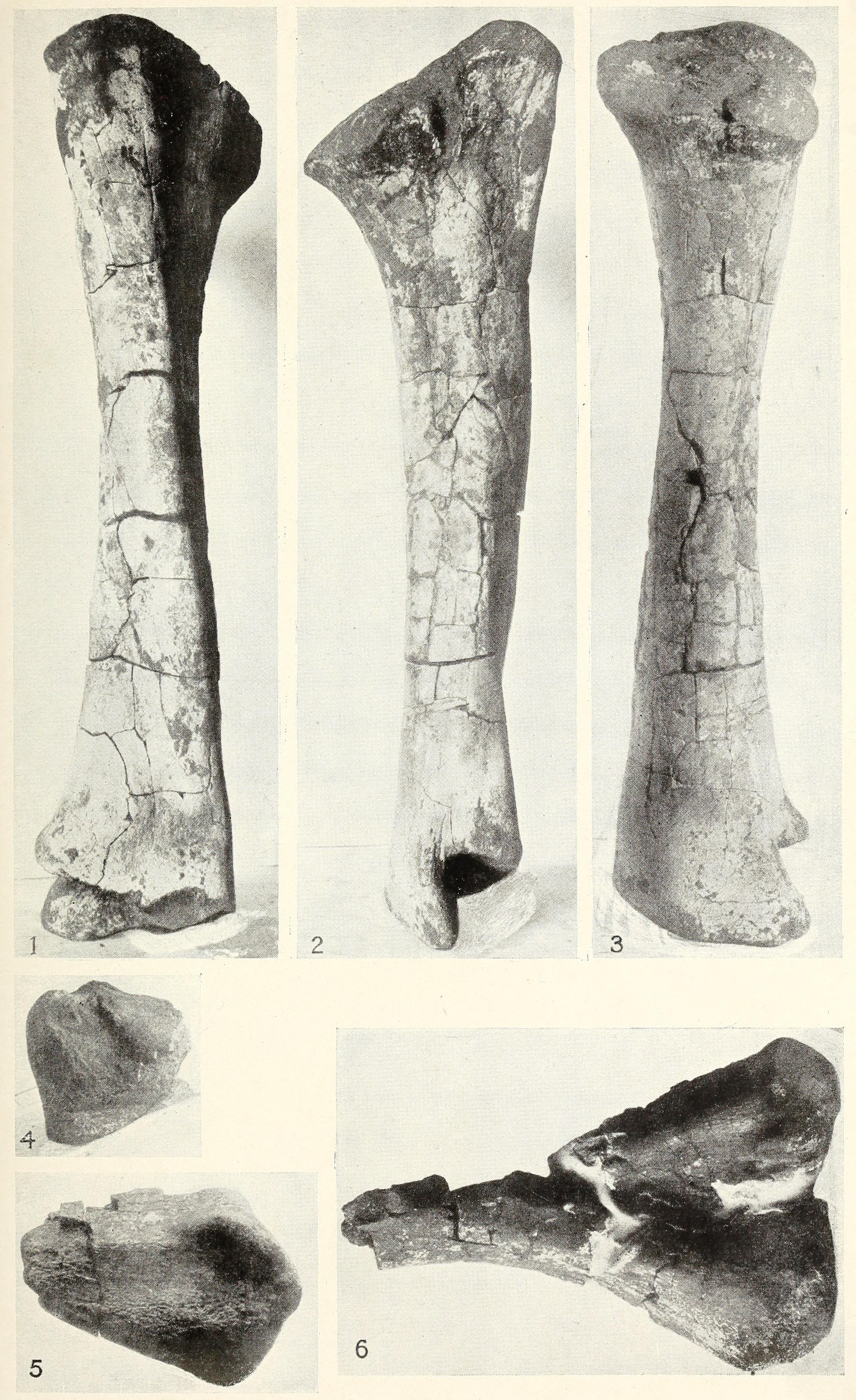
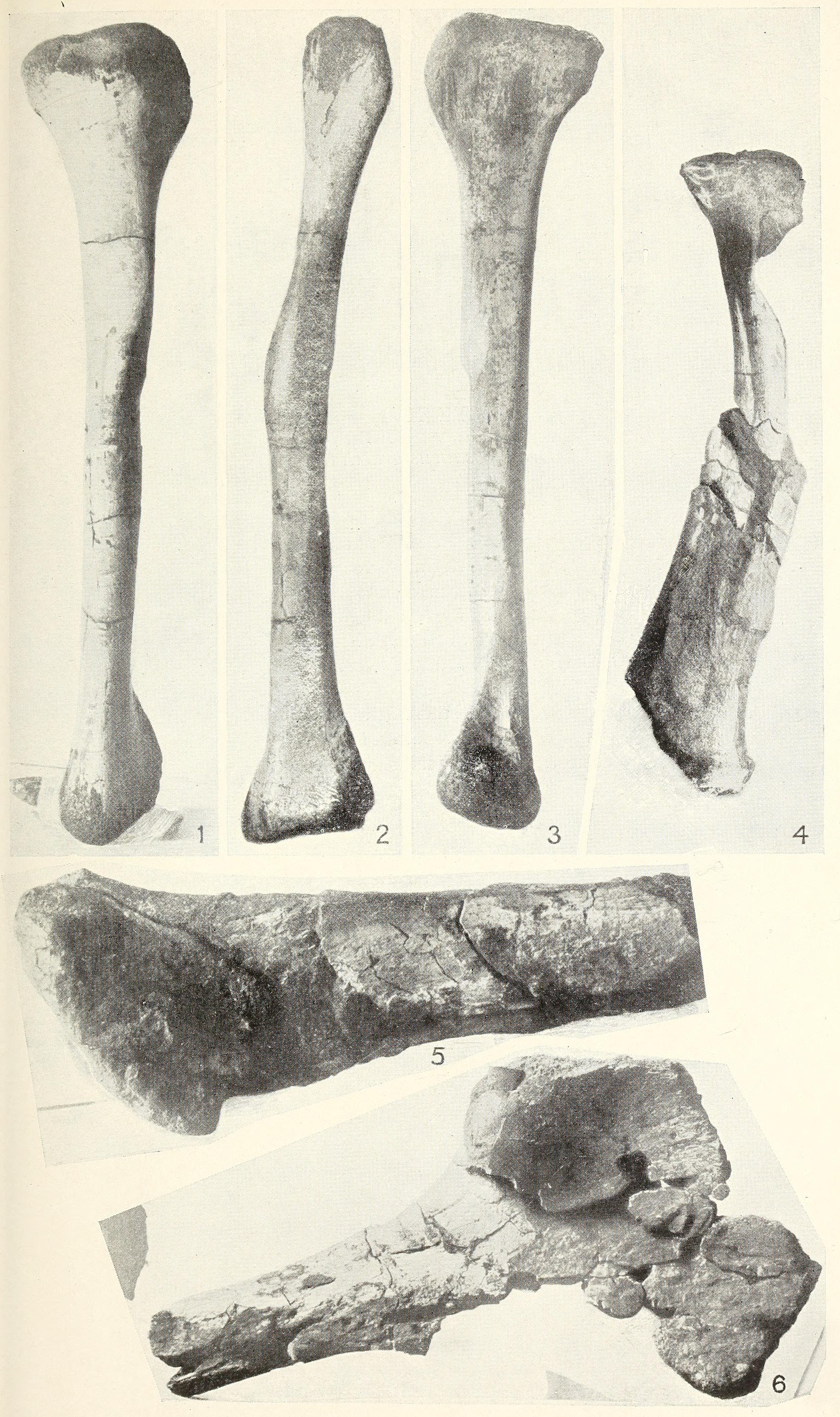
Parts of the type specimen. Left: Femur (top) and radius and metatarsals (bottom). Middle: Tibia (top), metatarsals (bottom left), and humerus (bottom right). Right: Fibula (top) and ischium (bottom)

== Discovery ==
The only known specimen was discovered by the palaeontologist Egbert Cornelis Nicolaas van Hoepen at Noupoortsnek, close to the road from Bethlehem to Clarens. At the time of discovery, weathering had already freed most of the two pubes (the front bones of the pelvis) from the surrounding rock. During the excavation, the shaft of the tibia (shin bone) scattered into pieces, but van Hoepen was able to immediately fit and glue the bone back together. The specimen became part of the collection of the Ditsong National Museum of Natural History (at the time known as the Transvaal Museum) in Pretoria, where van Hoepen was working at the time, under the specimen number TM 123. Van Hoepen described the specimen in 1920 as the new genus and species Dromicosaurus gracilis. The name Dromicosaurus derives from the Ancient Greek δρομικός 'quickly walking' and sauros 'lizard'. Van Hoepen selected this name because "the slender leg must have enabled the animal to go quicker than, for example, Eucnemesaurus and also implies a more slender form."

The specimen comes from the Elliot Formation, though it is unknown if from the upper (Upper Triassic) or lower (Lower Jurassic) Elliot Formation. According to van Hoepen, the specimen includes an almost complete neck vertebra (possibly the third), around eight, poorly preserved vertebrae from the front part of the tail, parts of the humerus and radius, the well-preserved pubes, poorly preserved ischia, a weathered femur, the well-preserved right tibia and fibula, and several foot bones including the first three metatarsals. The length of the femur is 49.5 cm. Friedrich von Huene, in 1932, stated that the neck vertebra was actually a dorsal (back) vertebra.

== Taxonomy and status ==
Van Hoepen identified Dromicosaurus as a member of the Anchisauridae, clearly different from the related Plateosauridae that was also recognised at that time. At the time, both groups were thought to represent theropod dinosaurs, while they are classified as basal sauropodomorphs today. Von Hoepen found his new taxon to be distinct from other taxa including Massospondylus carinatus, Massospondylus harriesi, Aetonyx palustris, Thecodontosaurus skirtopodus, Thecodontosaurus browni, Gryponyx africanus, Teratosaurus suevicus, and Plateosaurus quenstedti. Much of the sauropodomorph material from the Lower Jurassic of southern Africa, including Dromicosaurus, would later be lumped under the species Massospondylus carinatus, which, at that time, was only known from fragments. Van Hoepen pointed out differences in the femur and tibia to the latter species: The fourth trochanter (ridge on the femur where muscles attached) was located more proximally (higher on the bone) in Dromicosaurus, and the proportions of the lower end of the tibia were different.

Von Huene, in 1932, stated that Dromicosaurus was closely related to M. carinatus, M. harriesi, and Thecodontosaurus. He argued that the high location of the fourth trochanter and the short fore limb (with the humerus measuring only half the length of the femur) suggested that the limbs were strongly bent at the knee, and that the animal must have been bipedal. In 1976, Peter Galton and Michael Albert Cluver considered Dromicosaurus gracilis as a synonym of Massospondylus harriesi, following an opinion of John Attridge. Michael Cooper, in a 1981 monograph on Massospondylus, instead synonymised Dromicosaurus gracilis with M. carinatus. The two most recent revisions, those of Galton (1990) and Galton and Upchurch (2004), instead list Dromicosaurus gracilis as an indeterminate (dubious) sauropodomorph.
