= 1911 in paleontology =

Paleontology or palaeontology is the study of prehistoric life forms on Earth through the examination of plant and animal fossils. This includes the study of body fossils, tracks (ichnites), burrows, cast-off parts, fossilised feces (coprolites), palynomorphs and chemical residues. Because humans have encountered fossils for millennia, paleontology has a long history both before and after becoming formalized as a science. This article records significant discoveries and events related to paleontology that occurred or were published in the year 1911.

== Arthropods ==
Name	Novelty	Status	Authors	Age	Type locality	Country	Notes	Images
Sidneyia	Gen. et sp. Nov	Valid	Walcott	Cambrian	Burgess Shale	Canada (British Columbia); USA (Pennsylvania andUtah )		Sidneyia

== Amphibians ==
Name	Novelty	Status	Authors	Age	Type locality	Country	Notes	Images
Limnoscelis	Gen. et sp. Nov	Valid	S.W. Williston	Late Carboniferous to Early Permian	Cutler Formation	USA (Colorado and New Mexico)	Nominal genus for the family Limnoscelidae	Limnoscelis

== Reptiles ==
=== Dinosaurs ===
Name	Novelty	Status	Authors	Age	Type locality	Country	Notes	Images
Aetonyx	Gen. et sp. nov	Junior synonym	Broom	Early Jurassic	Upper Elliot Formation	South Africa	Junior synonym of Massospondylus.	
Geranosaurus	Gen. et sp. nov	Nomen dubium	Broom	Early Jurassic	Clarens Formation	South Africa		
Gryponyx	Gen. et sp. nov	Valid taxon	Broom	Early Jurassic	Upper Elliot Formation	South Africa	A sauropodomorph	
Gyposaurus	Gen. et sp. nov	Possibly a Junior synonym	Broom	Early Jurassic	Upper Elliot Formation	South Africa	A probable junior synonym of Massospondylus.	
Podokesaurus	Gen. et sp. nov	Disputed	Talbot	Early Jurassic	Portland Formation	USA	Possible Junior synonym of Coelophysis.	
Tornieria	Gen. et sp. nov	Valid taxon	Sternfeld	Late Jurassic	Tendaguru Formation	Tanzania		

== Synapsids ==
=== Non-mammalian synapsids ===
Name	Novelty	Status	Authors	Age	Type locality	Country	Notes	Images
Arctognathus	Gen. et sp. nov	Valid	Broom	Late Permian		South Africa	A South African Gorgonopsid.	Arctognathus
Arctosuchus	Gen. et sp. nov	Valid	Broom	Late Permian	Teekloof Formation	South Africa	A South African Gorgonopsid.	
Diaelurodon	Gen. et sp. nov	Junior synonym	Broom	Late Permian		South Africa	Junior synonym of Pristerodon	
Eriphostoma	Gen. et sp. nov	Valid	Broom	Middle Permian	Abrahamskraal Formation	South Africa	Another South African Gorgonopsian.	
Ictidognathus	Gen. et sp. nov	Valid	Broom	Late Permian	Teekloof Formation	South Africa	A Therocephalian	
Moschops	Gen. et sp. nov	Valid	Broom	Middle Permian	Abrahamskraal Formation	South Africa	A Dome-Headed Dinocephalian.	Moschops
Taognathus	Gen. et sp. nov	Valid	Broom	Late Permian		South Africa	A Dicynodont.	

== Other Animals ==
Name	Novelty	Status	Authors	Age	Type locality	Country	Notes	Images
Amiskwia	Gen. et sp. nov	Valid	Walcott	Cambrian	Burgess Shale	Canada	A soft-bodied organism of uncertain placement, currently interpreted as a Gnathiferan	Diagram, showing the arrangements of the jaws and plates in the mouth (a) morphology of the ventral plate (b) and jaws (c) in comparison to equivalent elements of gnathostomulids (d,e) and life restoration (g)
