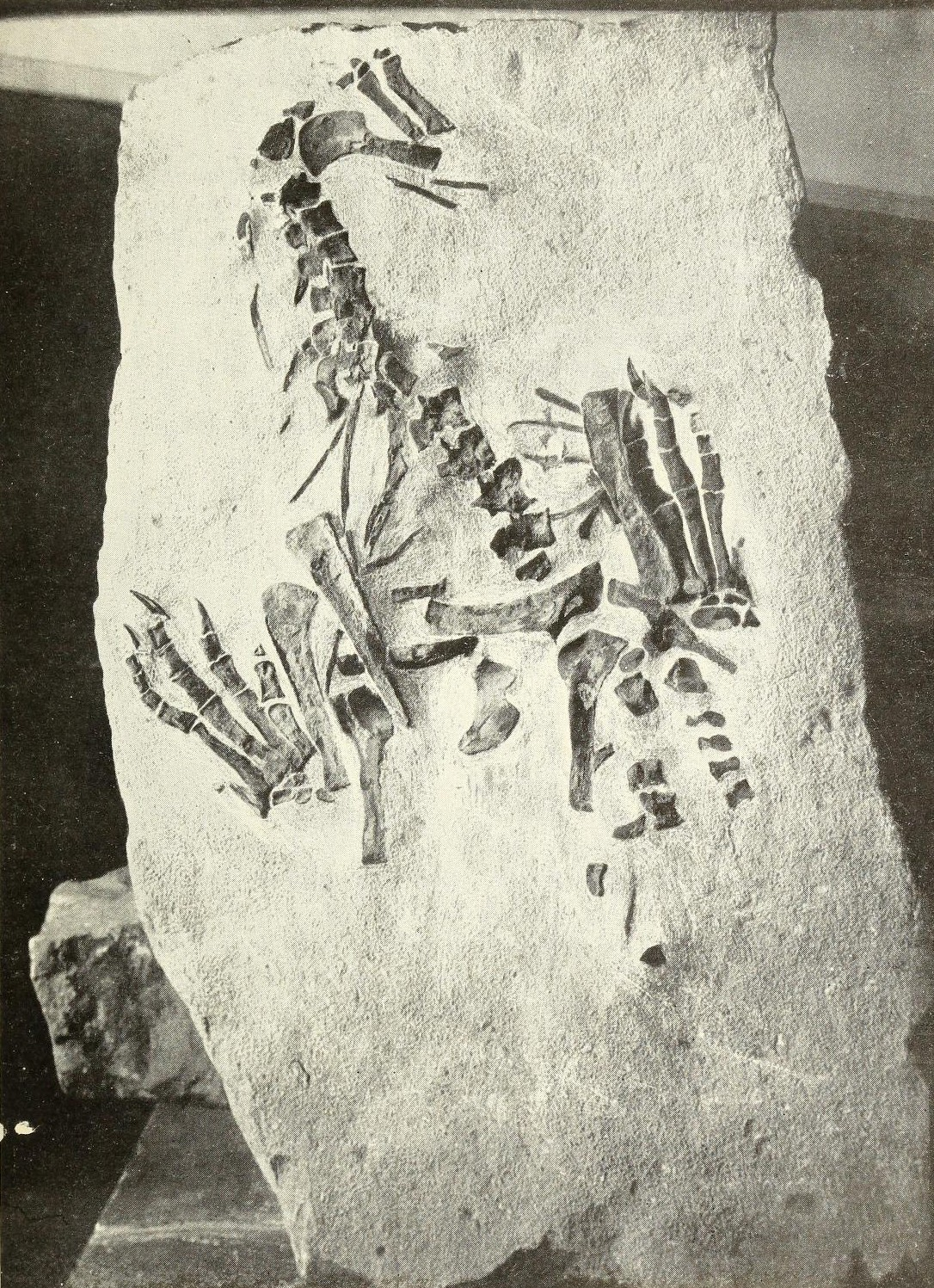
- Aristosaurus holotype specimen

Scientific classification
- Domain: Eukaryota
- Kingdom: Animalia
- Phylum: Chordata
- Clade: Dracohors
- Clade: Dinosauria
- Clade: Saurischia
- Clade: †Sauropodomorpha
- Genus: †Aristosaurus van Hoepen, 1920

Species
- †A. erectus van Hoepen, 1920

= Aristosaurus =

Aristosaurus Temporal range: Early Jurassic, Pliensbachian–Toarcian 192.9–174.7 Ma

Dubious dinosaur genus from South Africa

Aristosaurus is a dubious genus of sauropodomorph dinosaur from the Early Jurassic of southern Africa. Its only species is A. erectus. Aristosaurus was named by Egbert Cornelis Nicolaas van Hoepen in 1920 based on a nearly complete skeleton found by quarry workers in the Clarens Formation in South Africa, and assigned to the family Anchisauridae. It was later assigned to the genera Gyposaurus and Massospondylus, but has been listed as an indeterminate (dubious) sauropodomorph by two recent reviews. The only specimen might have been a juvenile individual as indicated by its small size. The strongly flattened skeleton, which is preserved on two slabs, is exhibited in the Ditsong National Museum of Natural History in Pretoria.

== Discovery ==
The holotype skeleton of Aristosaurus was discovered by quarry workers while extracting building stones near Rosendal in South Africa's Free State province. The quarry workers split a stone, accidentally exposing a skeleton on both halves. The discovery sparkled considerable interest in Rosendal, and photographs of the skeleton circulated. One of the photographs reached Egbert Cornelis Nicolaas van Hoepen, palaeontologist at the Ditsong National Museum of Natural History (at the time known as the Transvaal Museum) in Pretoria. The museum subsequently bought the skeleton in November 1915; according to van Hoepen, it was one of the museum's best specimens. The specimen, which was given the specimen number TM 130, is part of the public museum exhibit.

The precise location of the find is unknown, though van Hoepen believed it probably came from the same quarry in which the fossil of a pseudosuchian (a distant crocodile-relative), Pedeticosaurus, had already been found. The site of discovery would have been located within the Clarens Formation.

The skeleton, which is exposed on two slabs of rock (slab and counter slab), is nearly complete but strongly flattened. The skull is missing except for parts of the upper and lower jaw with several teeth. The 14 dorsal vertebrae (of the back) are still articulated (in their original anatomical compound), but the cervical (neck) vertebrae were compressed into a single mass and the sacral (hip) vertebrae are not well exposed in the specimen. Only 12 caudal (tail) vertebrae are preserved. The front limb is incomplete but the hind limbs are well preserved, including both feet, with all individual toe bones being represented.

In a 1920 publication, van Hoepen described the specimen as the new genus and species Aristosaurus erectus. The generic name derives from the Greek aristo 'best' and sauros 'lizard'.

== Van Hoepen's description ==
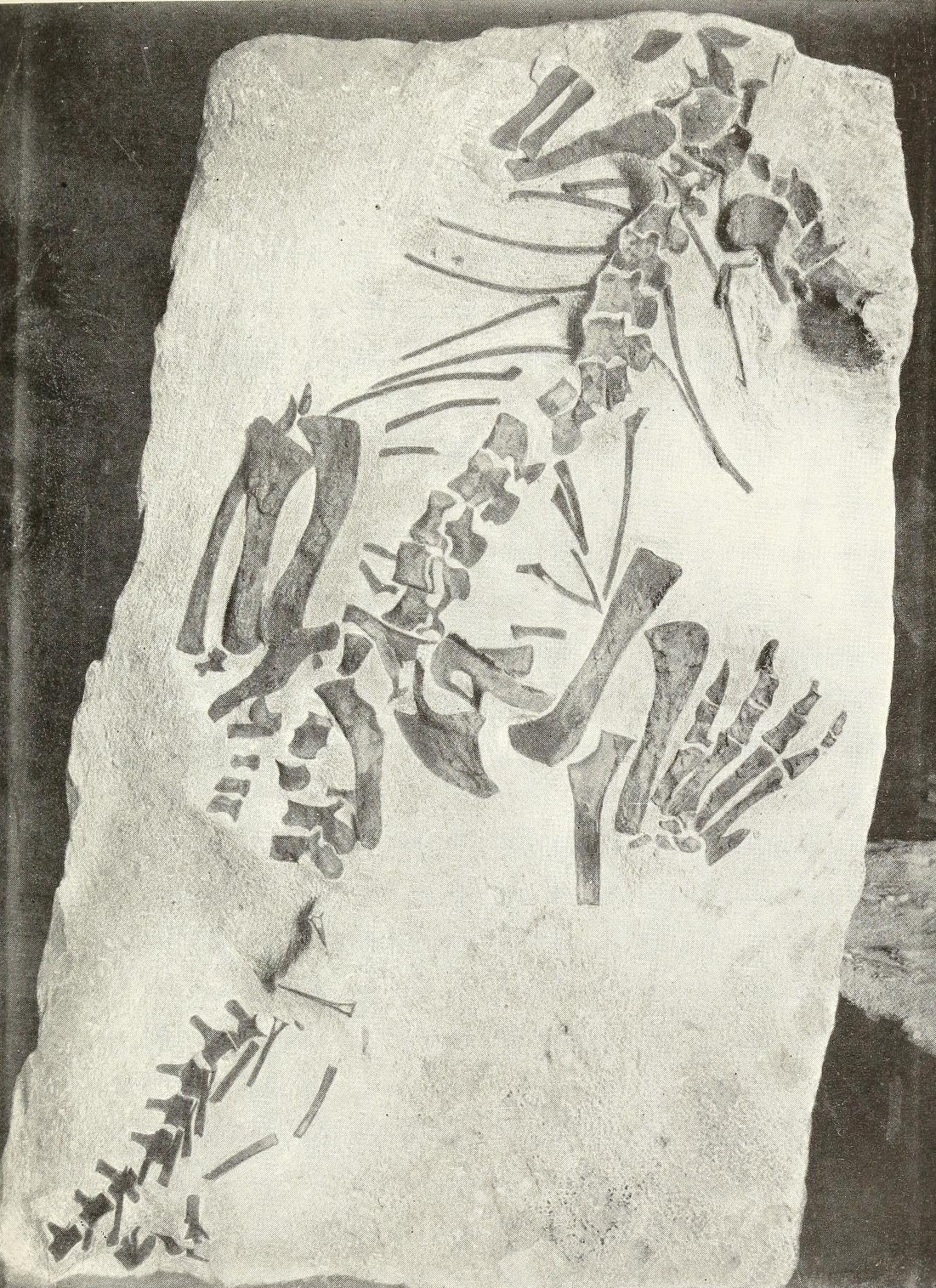
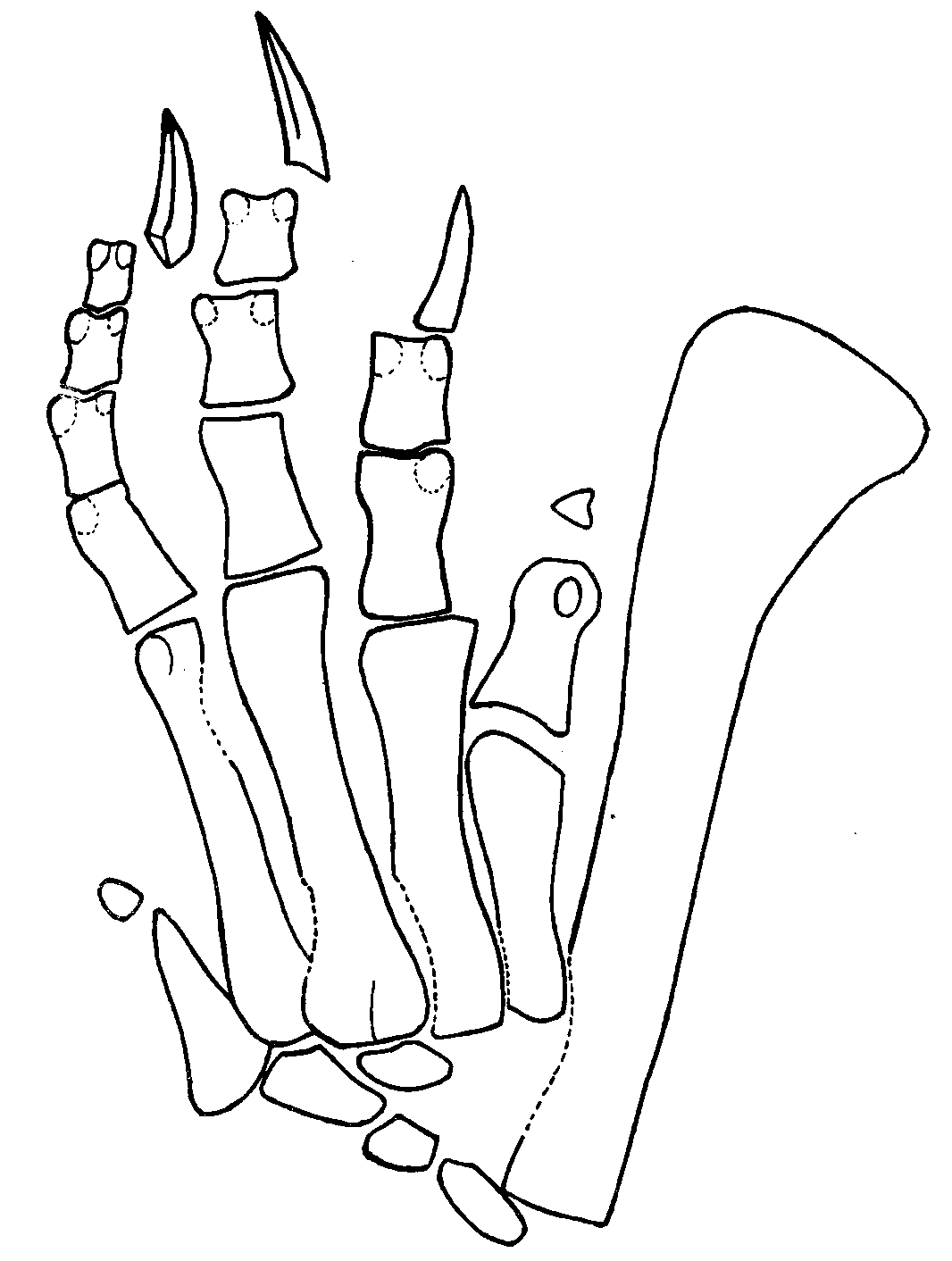
Covering slab of the Aristosaurus holotype specimen (left) and van Hoepen's line drawing of the left pes (right)

Van Hoepen characterised Aristosaurus as a "small dinosaur", with a femur length of 13.7 cm. He noted several features that distinguish Aristosaurus from other anchisaurids (the group to which he assigned the genus). From Massospondylus carinatus, which also occurred in the Clarens Formation, it differed in its much smaller size; the proportionally longer dorsal vertebrae; and in features of the pelvis including the lower end of the ischia which are, according to van Hoepen, not coalesced as in M. carinatus. Van Hoepen also considered Aristosaurus to be distinct from another species of Massospondylus recognised at the time, M. harriesi: Metatarsal II is shorter than metatarsal IV, while the opposite was the case in M. harriesi.

Van Hoepen concluded that Aristosaurus was "much more highly specialised than Thecodontosaurus, Ammosaurus, Anchisaurus and even than Massospondylus": The morphology of the pelvis would indicate bipedal (two-legged) locomotion, and is similar to that of the Plateosauridae. The fourth trochanter, a ridge on the back side of the femur on which locomotory limb muscles attached, had a very low position, close to the mid-length of the bone. The humerus was proportionally smaller than in other anchisaurids known at that time except Anchisaurus solus.

== Systematics and status ==
In his 1920 description, van Hoepen assigned Aristosaurus to the Anchisauridae. He rejected a referral to the only other similar family recognised at the time, the Plateosauridae, as these were much larger forms with 15 dorsal vertebrae, while Aristosaurus probably only had 14 dorsal vertebrae. Friedrich von Huene, in 1932, provided a short re-description of the specimen, noting several features such as the proportionally long cervicals. Von Huene found great similarities with a specimen of Gyposaurus capensis, and consequently regarded Aristosaurus erectus a synonym of that species, which he considered to be a member of Thecodontosauridae. This synonymy was followed by subsequent authors until Peter Galton and Michael Albert Cluver, in 1976, retained it as a valid taxon based on several differences to Gyposaurus, and classified it within Plateosauridae. However, these authors noted that the specimen needs to be further prepared and more illustrations of the fossils need to be published. In 1981, Michael Cooper considered Aristosaurus to be a juvenile specimen of Massospondylus, arguing that the anchisaurid characters pointed out by van Hoepen are due to its immaturity. The most recent reviews, however, listed Aristosaurus as an Nomen dubium, an indeterminate sauropodomorph.
