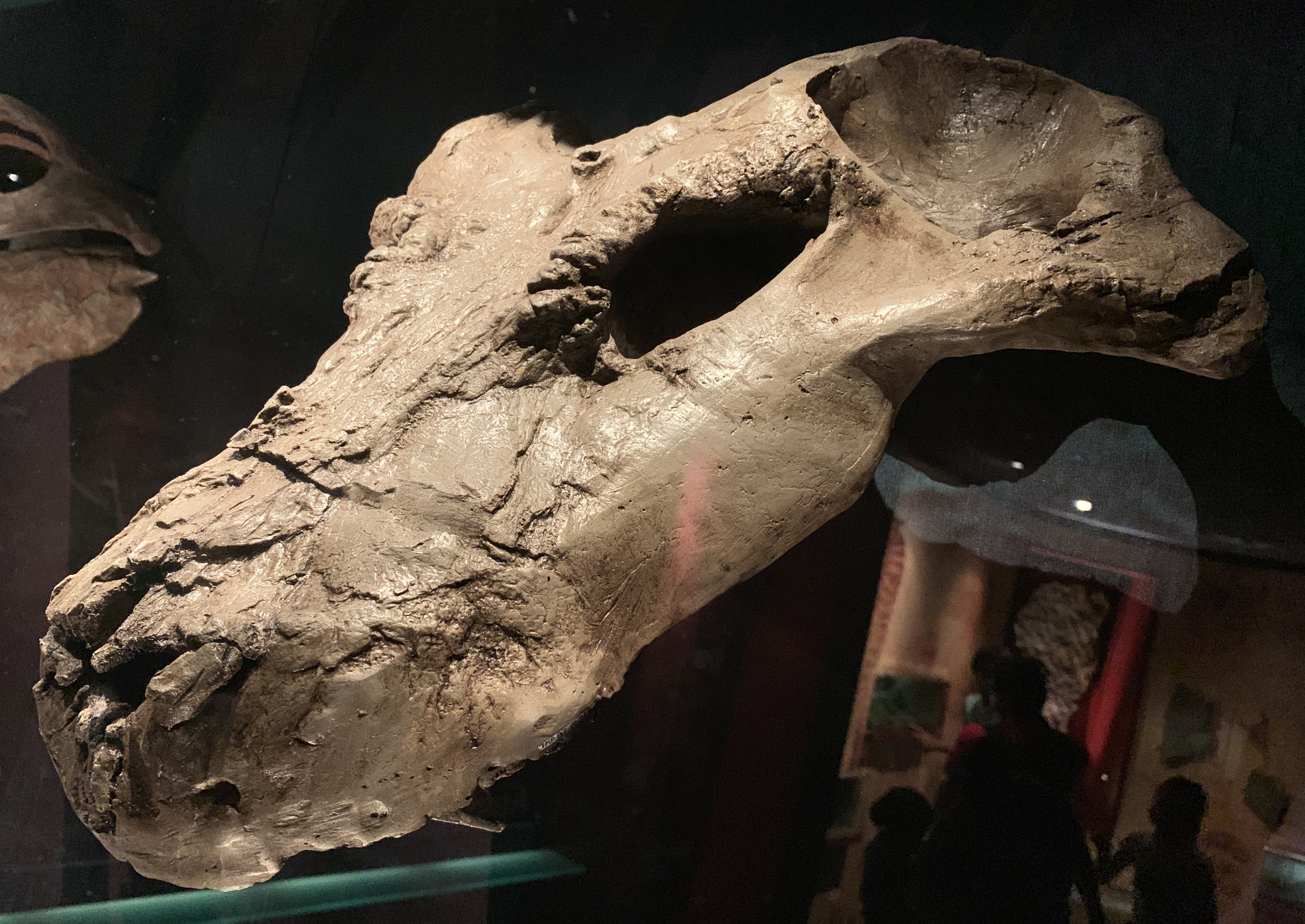
- skull cast, left lateral view

Scientific classification
- Domain: Eukaryota
- Kingdom: Animalia
- Phylum: Chordata
- Clade: Synapsida
- Clade: Therapsida
- Clade: †Gorgonopsia
- Family: †Gorgonopsidae
- Genus: †Broomisaurus; Joleaud, 1920

Type species
- †Broomisaurus planiceps (Broom, 1913)

Synonyms
- Scymnorhinus Broom, 1913(preoccupied)

= Broomisaurus =

Broomisaurus Temporal range: Permian

Extinct genus of therapsids

Broomisaurus is an extinct genus of Gorgonopsia. It was first named by Joleaud in 1920, and contains the single species B. planiceps. Gebauer (2007) considered Broomisaurus to be a nomen dubium, indistinguishable as a separate taxon of gorgonopsian because it is based on only a fragmentary remains. A 2015 paper on Eriphostoma tentatively agreed with Gebauer's determination, but did not rule out the possibility that Broomisaurus might be synonymous with Eriphostoma.

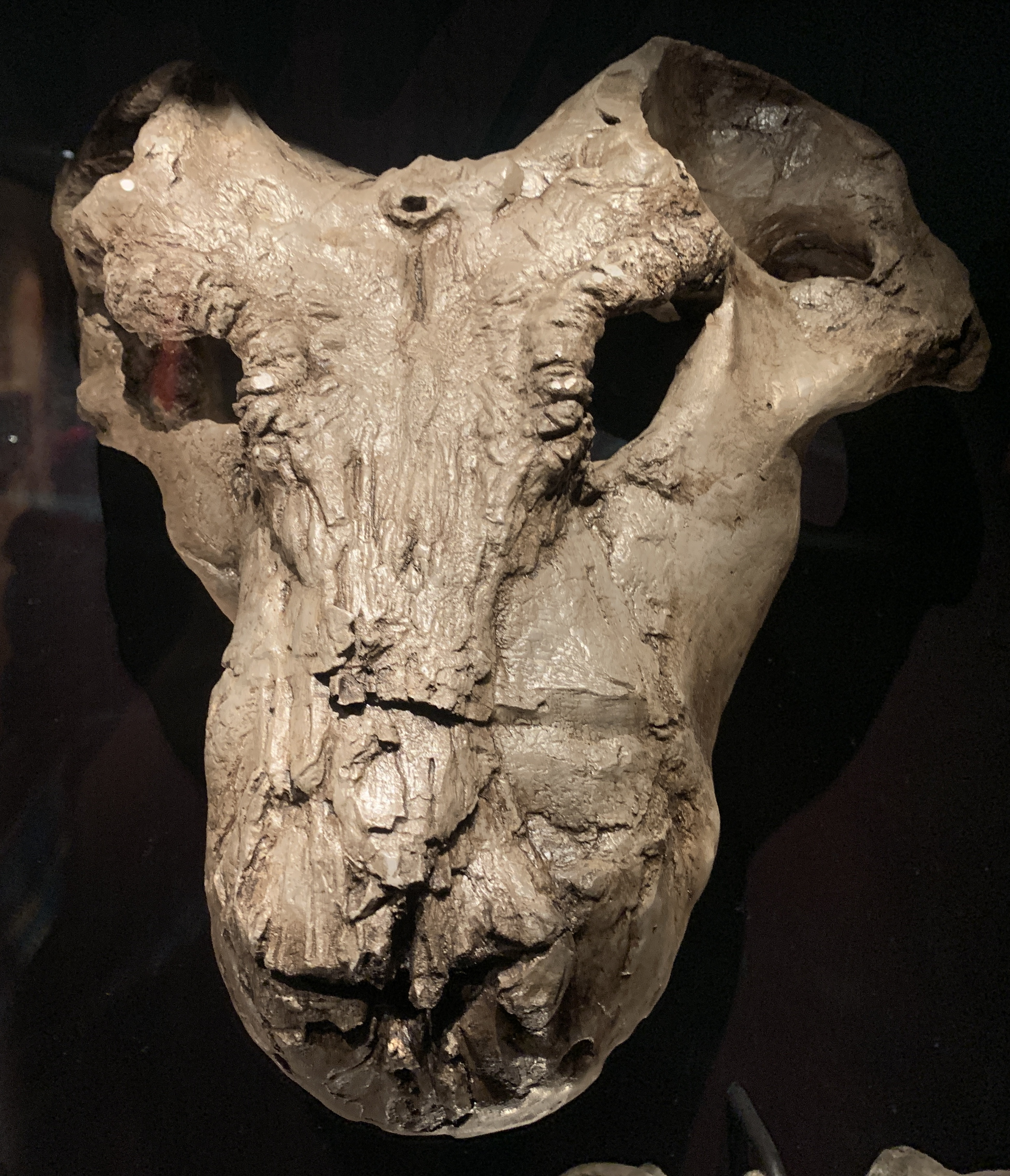
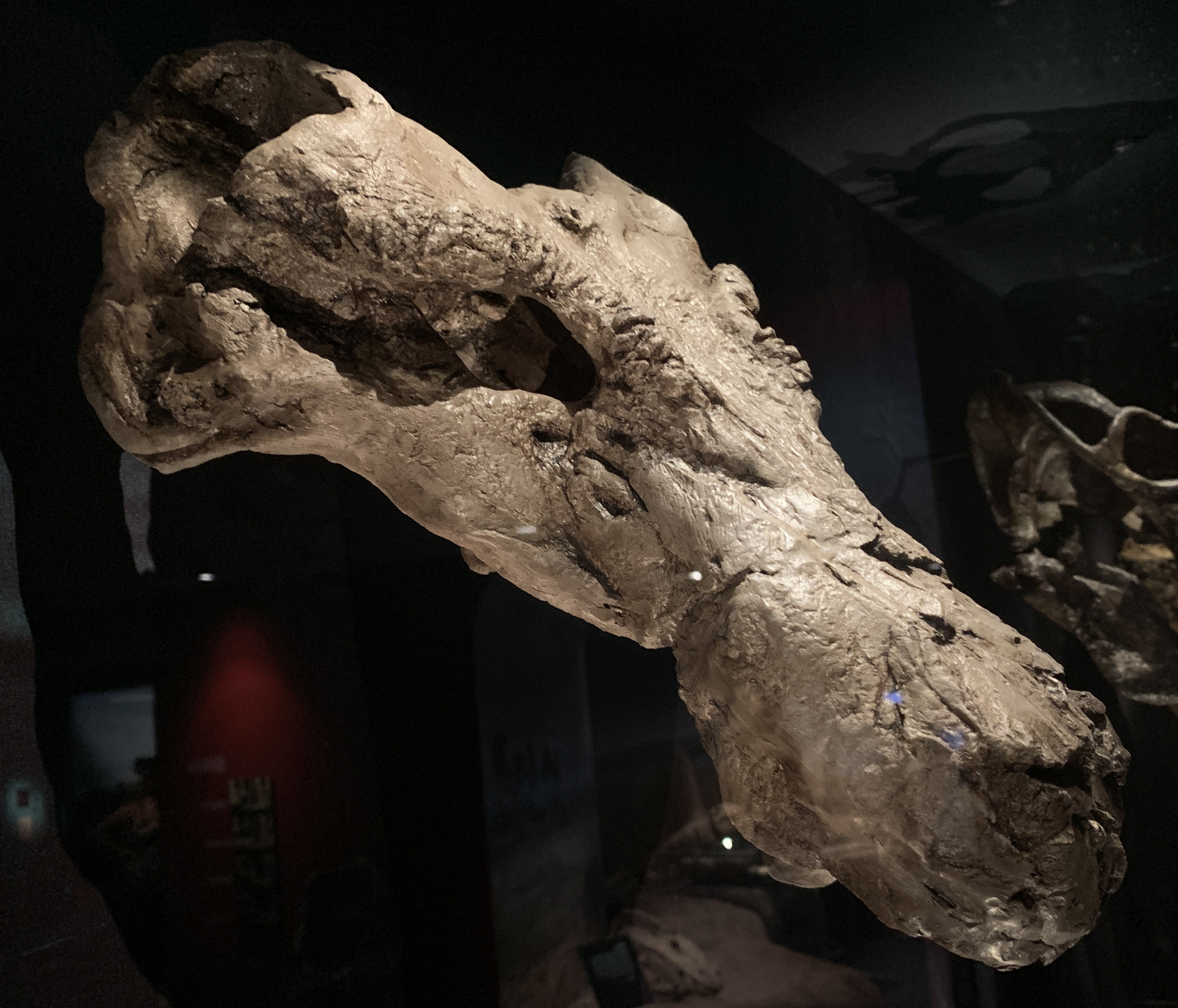
Broomisaurus skull cast, dorsal view (top) and right lateral view (bottom). At the Royal Tyrrell Museum of Palaeontology.

== Sources ==
- Palaeontologia Africana; page 106. By the Bernard Price Institute for Paleontological Research, published 1953.
- www.paleofile.com - Alphabetical list, B section
