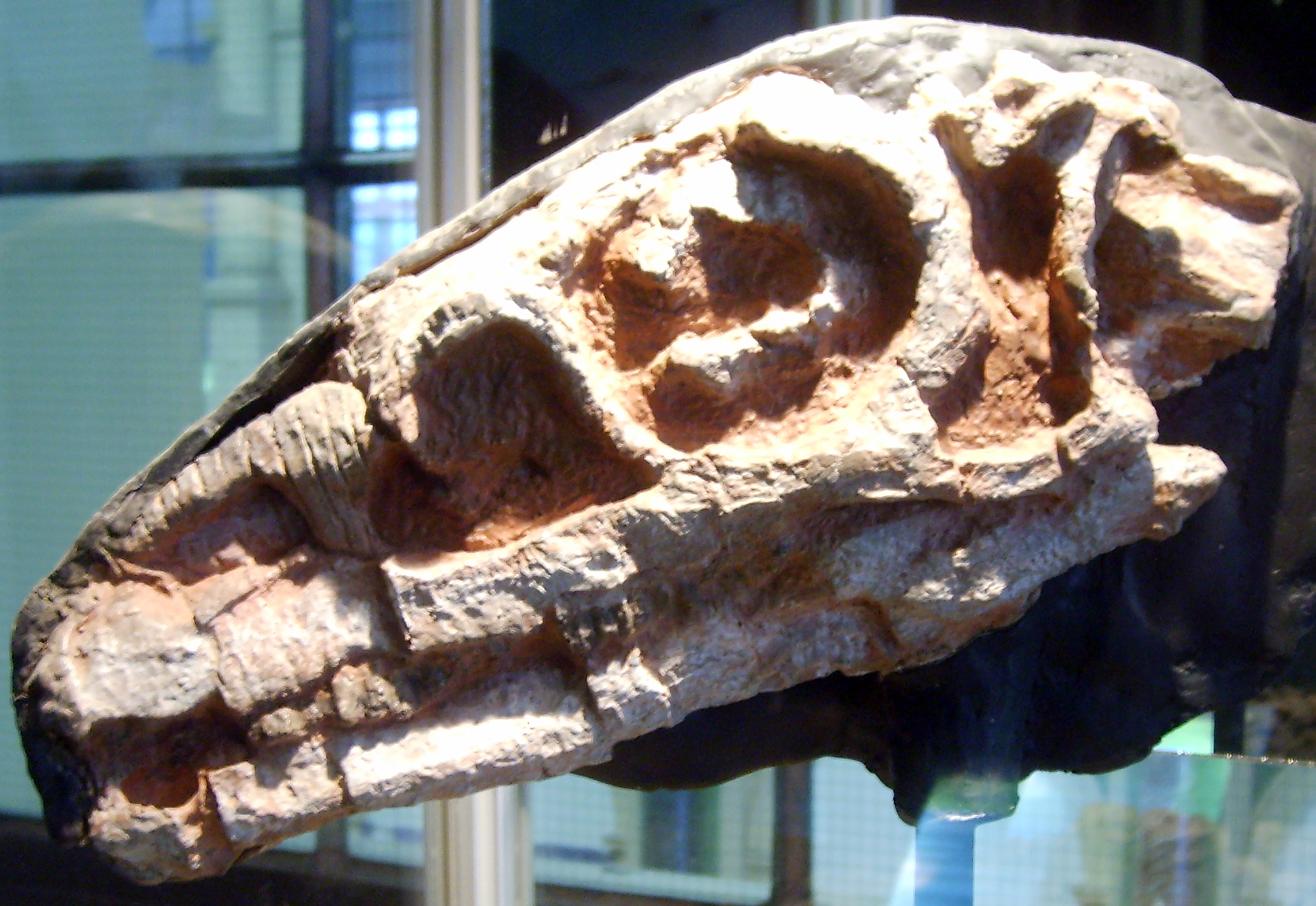
- Riojasaurus skull cast

Scientific classification
- Kingdom: Animalia
- Phylum: Chordata
- Class: Reptilia
- Clade: Dinosauria
- Clade: Saurischia
- Clade: †Sauropodomorpha
- Clade: †Massopoda
- Clade: †Riojasauridae; Yates, 2007

Genera
- †Eucnemesaurus; †Riojasaurus

= Riojasauridae =

Riojasaurids Temporal range: Late Triassic, 228–213 Ma

Extinct clade of dinosaurs

The Riojasauridae is an extinct family of sauropodomorph dinosaur. Members of this family lived during the Late Triassic Period (late Carnian to Norian Ages). Riojasauridae contains the genera Riojasaurus and Eucnemesaurus. The family is considered a stem taxon, and is defined as "the most inclusive clade containing Riojasaurus incertus but not Plateosaurus engelhardti, Massospondylus carinatus, or Anchisaurus polyzelus". Geologic formations containing riojasaurid fossils include the Lower Elliot Formation of Orange Free State, South Africa (where fossils of Eucnemesaurus have been found), and the Los Colorados Formation, in La Rioja Province, Argentina (where fossils of Riojasaurus have been recovered).

== Evolutionary relationships ==
Riojasaurids are considered to be sauropodomorphs, but not sauropods themselves. This means that they were generally much smaller than the sauropods of the Jurassic and Cretaceous Periods, and that members of this family may not have been obligate quadrupeds, the way more derived sauropods were. The relationships of this family within other sauropodomorphs has been considered by studies in 2007 and 2020 with slightly different results.

The cladogram below shows basal sauropodomorph relationships simplified after Yates, 2007. In this analysis, Riojasauridae was recovered as the earliest-diverging lineage of the clade Massopoda, and represents a sister group to the node formed by Massospondylidae, the genus Jingshanosaurus and the Anchisauria.

- Plateosauria
  - Plateosauridae
    - Unaysaurus
    - Plateosaurus
  - Massopoda
    - Riojasauridae
      - Riojasaurus
      - Eucnemesaurus
    - - Massospondylidae
        - Massospondylus
        - - Coloradisaurus
          - Lufengosaurus
      - - Jingshanosaurus
        - Anchisauria

The following cladogram is from a phylogenetic analysis by Peyre de Fabrègues et al., 2020. Here, Riojasauridae was placed in a more derived position, lying closer to Sauropoda than to Massospondylidae, and appearing as the out group to the clade formed by the genus Seitaad and the Sauropodiformes. The Massospondylidae and the taxa considered to be related to the family by Yates, are shown to be represent more primitive lineages.

- Massopoda
  - - Plateosauravus
    - Ruehleia
  - - Anchisaurus
    - - Sarahsaurus
      - - Massospondylidae
        - - Xingxiulong
          - - Jingshanosaurus
            - - Yunnanosaurus
              - - Riojasauridae
                  - Eucnemesaurus
                  - Riojasaurus
                - - Seitaad
                  - Sauropodiformes
