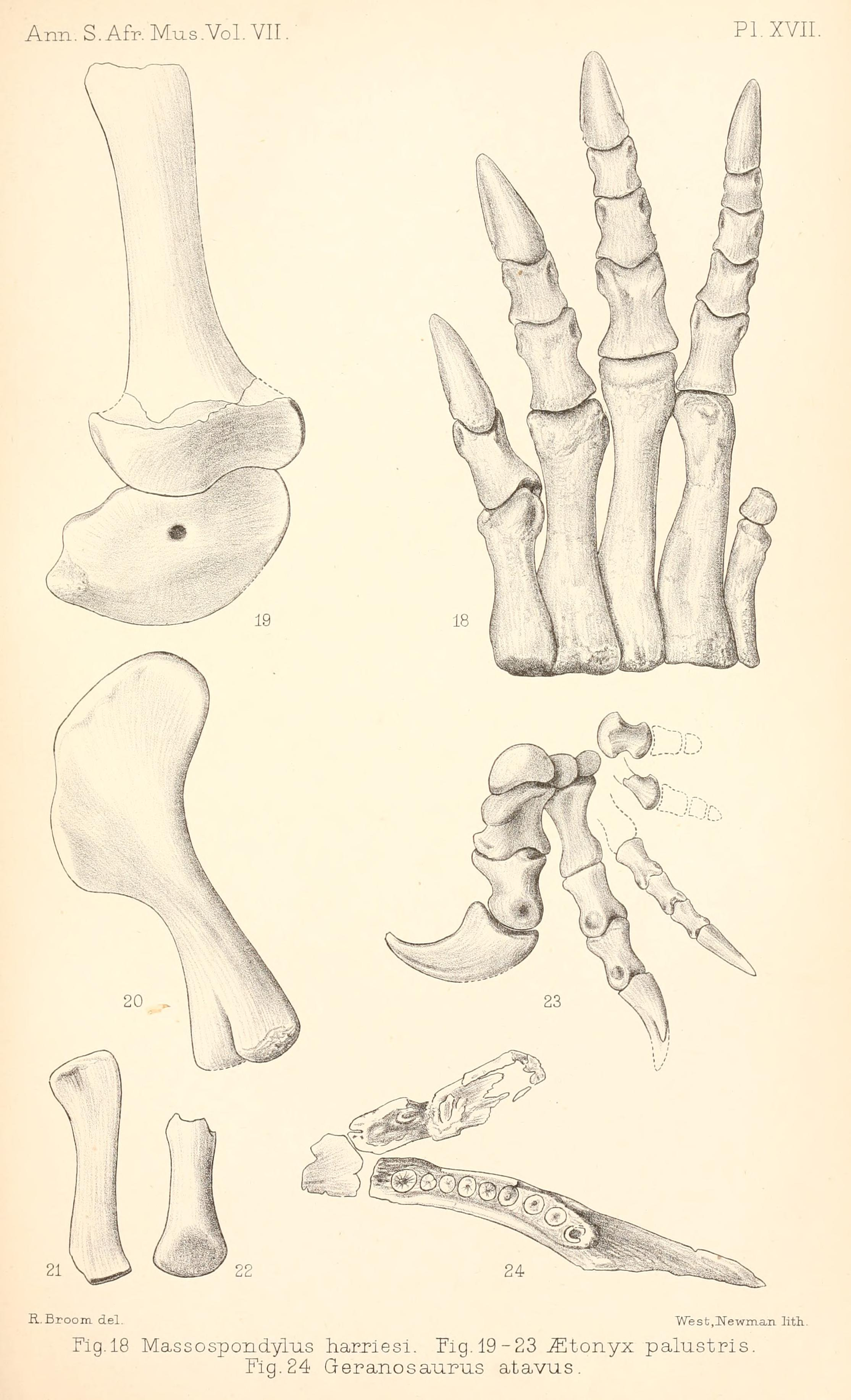
- Type specimens of Aetonyx palustris (19–23), Massospondylus harriesi (18), and Geranosaurus (24)

Scientific classification
- Domain: Eukaryota
- Kingdom: Animalia
- Phylum: Chordata
- Clade: Dinosauria
- Clade: Saurischia
- Clade: †Sauropodomorpha
- Genus: †Aetonyx; Broom, 1911

Species
- †A. palustris Broom, 1911

= Aetonyx =

Aetonyx Temporal range: Early Jurassic, Hettangian–Sinemurian 201.4–192.9 Ma

Dubious dinosaur genus from South Africa

Aetonyx is a dubious genus of sauropodomorph dinosaur from the Early Jurassic of southern Africa. Its only species is A. palustris, which was named by Robert Broom in 1911 based on a fragmentary skeleton from the upper Elliot Formation found near Fouriesburg, Free State Province. Broom considered it as a species of "carnivorous dinosaur". In 1924, Sydney H. Haughton assigned a second specimen to Aetonyx, which is also from Fouriesburg. In 1932, Friedrich von Huene suggested that the species Thecodontosaurus dubius, which Haughton had named in his 1924 paper, is a synonym of Aetonyx palustris. The species was later synonymised with Massospondylus harriesi and Massospondylus carinatus. A 2004 review lists it as an indeterminate sauropodomorph.

== Discovery ==
Aetonyx was named in 1911 by Robert Broom from a fragmentary skeleton excavated by A. R. Walker, who worked at the Iziko South African Museum, where the specimen is still stored (specimen number SAM-PK-2768-2770). The specimen was found near Fouriesburg, Free State Province, in sediments of the upper Elliot Formation, which was deposited during the Hettangian and Sinemurian ages of the Early Jurassic.

The specimen is well-preserved and consists of three neck vertebrae, one back vertebra, some distal tail vertebrae, a shoulder blade with coracoid, and parts of the forelimb (humerus, radius, ulna, both hands) and hind limb (the upper end of a tibia and an almost complete foot). The humerus was 17.4 cm in length. The name may be translated as 'eagle claw' (from the Ancient Greek aetos 'eagle' and onyx 'claw'), and probably refers to the large claw on the second toe which, according to Broom, resembled those seen in many birds and could have been used for grooming its scales.

== Taxonomic history and status ==
Taxa today classified as basal sauropodomorphs, including Aetonyx, have been historically classified as theropods until the mid-twentieth century. Broom introduced the new taxon as a "carnivorous dinosaur". A second specimen from the same locality was assigned to Aetonyx in 1924 by Sydney H. Haughton; this specimen consists of the lower end of a fibula and three right metatarsals. In 1932, Friedrich von Huene classified Aetonyx within the Carnosauria, noting resemblances to the large carnivorous theropod Megalosaurus. The penultimate phalanges of the hand are elongated in Aetonyx, which von Huene thought was an adaptation for capturing prey. He cautioned, however, that only the discovery of a skull can confirm its carnosaurian affinities. Von Huene also declared Thecodontosaurus dubius, a species that Haughton had named in his 1924 paper, to be a synonym of Aetonyx palustris. T. dubius was based on a partly articulated (connected) skeleton from the Clarens Formation found near Ladybrand, South Africa

In 1970, Rodney Steel still listed Aetonyx palustris as a valid taxon, but in 1976, Peter Galton and Michael Albert Cluver proposed that it is a synonym of Massospondylus harriesi, a species that was named by Broom in 1911, in the same paper that named Aetonyx palustris itself. In 1981, Michael Cooper synonymised both species with the type species of Massospondylus, M. carinatus, which was followed by Galton in a 1990 review. In a 2004 review, Galton and Paul Upchurch considered all these remains to be undiagnostic and listed Aetonyx palustris, Thecodontosaurus dubius, and Massospondylus harriesi as indeterminate sauropodomorphs (Nomina dubia).
