= Arctosuchus =

Arctosuchus Temporal range: Late Permian, 260–258 Ma

Scientific classification
- Domain: Eukaryota
- Kingdom: Animalia
- Phylum: Chordata
- Clade: Synapsida
- Clade: Therapsida
- Clade: †Gorgonopsia
- Family: †Gorgonopsidae
- Genus: †Arctosuchus; Broom, 1911

Type species
- †Arctosuchus tigrinus Broom, 1911

Other species
- †A. buceros?

Synonyms
- Arctosuchus buceros?; Lycosaurus tigrinus Owen, 1876

Arctosuchus is an extinct genus of gorgonopsid from the Lopingian (Permian). The type species, A. tigrinus, is from the Teekloof Formation (Tropidostoma Assemblage Zone), although a second species, A. buceros, from the Wolfville Formation (Upper Wolfville Member) of Nova Scotia, Canada, may also belong to the genus, but it is from the Triassic and it probably instead belongs to an indeterminate synapsid.

The type and only specimen of A. tigrinus consists of a fragmentary skull and fragmentary dentary. The remains of A. buceros are unknown and are possibly now lost.

== See also ==
- List of therapsids
