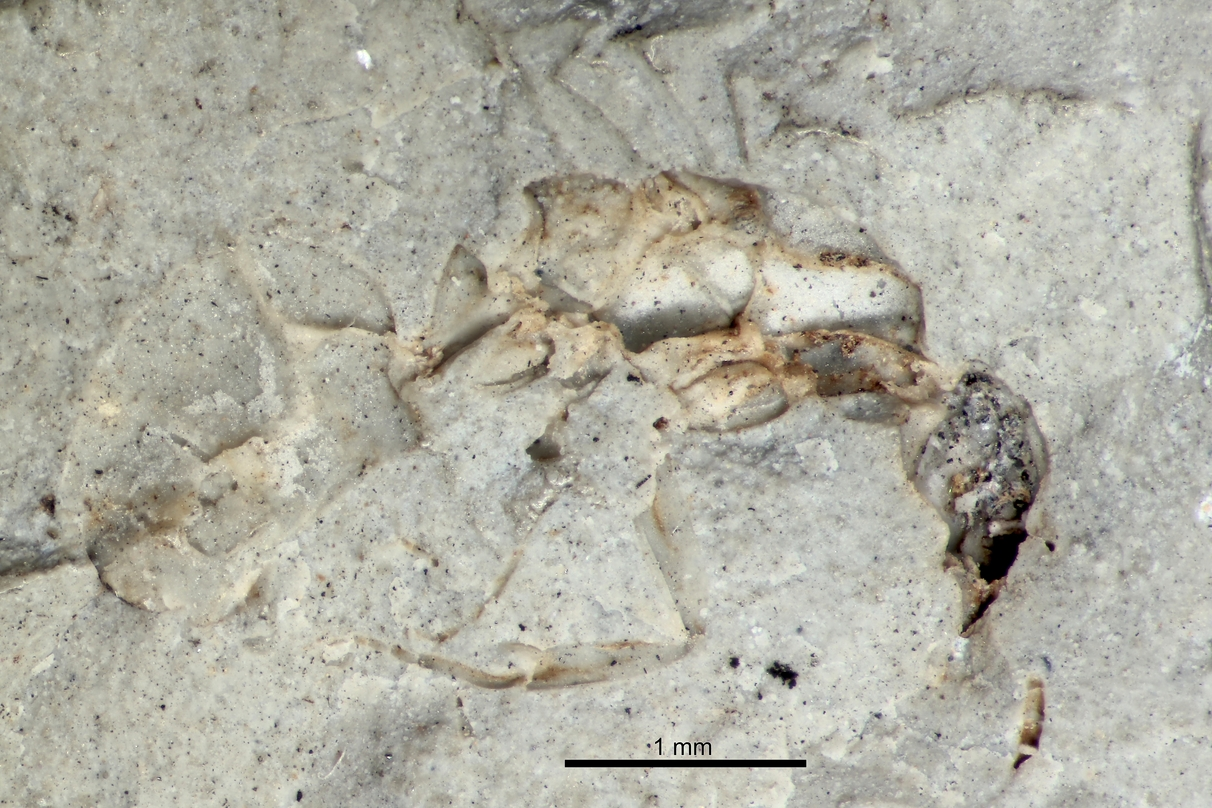
- Holotype queen in marl

Scientific classification
- Domain: Eukaryota
- Kingdom: Animalia
- Phylum: Arthropoda
- Class: Insecta
- Order: Hymenoptera
- Family: Formicidae
- Subfamily: Dolichoderinae
- Genus: Dolichoderus
- Species: †D. vectensis

Binomial name
- †Dolichoderus vectensis Donisthorpe, 1920

= Dolichoderus vectensis =

Dolichoderus vectensis Temporal range: Late Eocene to Early Oligocene

Species of ant

Dolichoderus vectensis is an extinct species of the Oligocene ant in the genus Dolichoderus. Described by Horace Donisthorpe in 1920, the fossils of the species were found in the United Kingdom.
