= Taognathus =

Scientific classification
- Domain: Eukaryota
- Kingdom: Animalia
- Phylum: Chordata
- Class: Reptilia
- Genus: †Taognathus; Broom, 1911

Taognathus is an extinct genus of dicynodont, a non-mammalian synapsid. Taognathus lived in South Africa during the Lopingian, and was named by Scottish South African doctor and paleontologist Robert Broom in 1911. Its diet was herbivorous.

== See also ==
- List of therapsids
