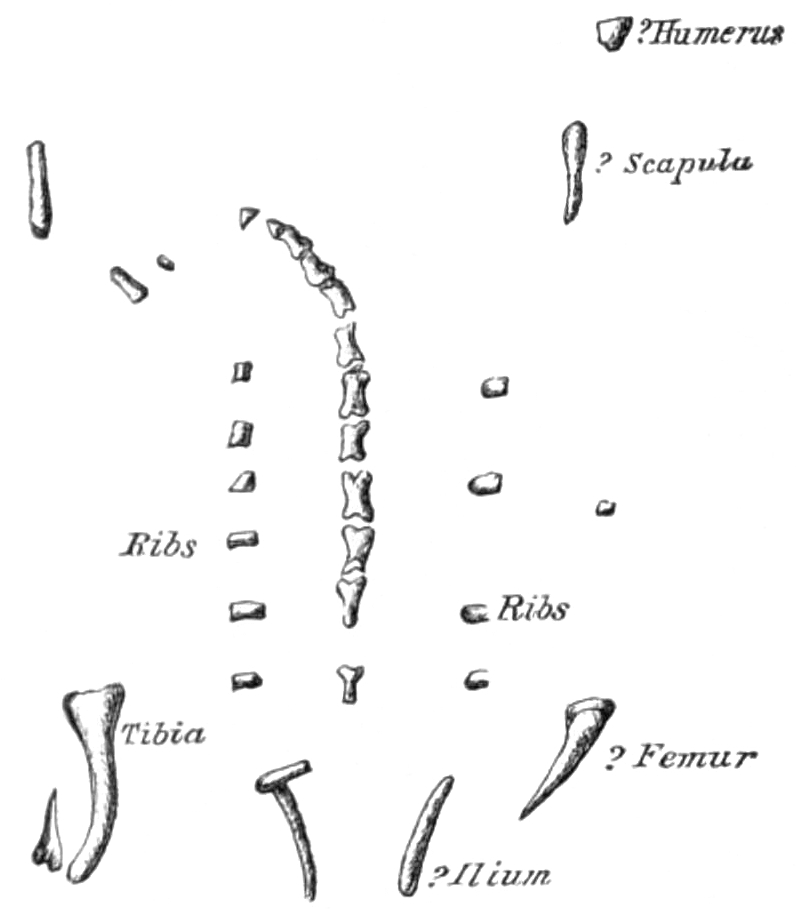
- Bones of the original specimen sticking out of a block of slate before the specimen was partially destroyed by blasting

Scientific classification
- Kingdom: Animalia
- Phylum: Chordata
- Class: Reptilia
- Clade: Dinosauromorpha
- Clade: Dinosauria
- Clade: Saurischia
- Clade: †Sauropodomorpha
- Genus: †Hortalotarsus; Seeley, 1894

Type species
- †Hortalotarsus skirtopodus Seeley, 1894

Synonyms
- Thecodontosaurus skirtopodus (Seeley, 1894)

= Hortalotarsus =

Hortalotarsus Temporal range: Early Jurassic, Pliensbachian–Toarcian, 192–181 Ma

Extinct genus of reptiles

Hortalotarsus is a dubious genus of sauropodomorph dinosaur from the Early Jurassic of southern Africa. The only species is H. skirtopodus. Hortalotarsus was described by Harry Seeley in 1894 based on parts of a hind limb discovered in the Clarens Formation near Makhanda, South Africa. Originally, these fossils were part of the larger part of a skeleton, locally known as the 'Bushman fossil', that had been destroyed using gunpowder in an attempt to remove the bones from the encasing slate. In 1906, Robert Broom assigned a second specimen to the species but later gave it a species of its own, Gyposaurus capensis. In 1906, Friedrich von Huene classified Hortalotarsus skirtopodus as a species within the European genus Thecodontosaurus, named Thecodontosaurus skirtopodus. Other authors considered Hortalotarsus skirtopodus as a valid species within the family Anchisauridae, though Michael Cooper synonymised it with Massospondylus carinatus in 1981. The two most recent reviews treated Hortalotarsus as an indeterminate sauropodomorph.

== Discovery ==
Hortalotarsus skirtopodus was described by Harry Seeley in 1894 based on a specimen in the Albany Museum in Makhanda, South Africa. This specimen was found by Mr. William Horner Wallace on 11 June 1888 in "Eagle's Crag", Barkly East; the precise locality is unknown. The specimen comes from the Clarens Formation, which was deposited during a period of some 10 million years during the Pliensbachian and early Toarcian ages, ca. 192 to 181 million years ago.

Locally known as the 'Bushman fossil', it originally consisted of a skeleton enclosed within a block of slate. A drawing of this block was made by Mr. D. Rudlin, a resident of Barkly East, showing parts of several bones sticking out of the rock, including eleven back vertebrae, ribs, probable shoulder blades, a possible humerus, ilia (upper bones of the pelvis), a tibia; a femur; and a metatarsus. The fossils were largely destroyed during an attempt to free them from the rock with the use of gunpowder. Robert Broom stated in 1911 that there were rumours that farmers, believing it was the skeleton of a Bushman, had destroyed the specimen "through fear that a Bushman skeleton in the rock might tend to weaken the religious belief of the rising generation". Two of the surviving fragments of the hind leg were given to Seeley, who further prepared them, leading to the naming of Hortalotarsus skirtopodus in 1894. The specimen, which became the holotype of the new species, was given the specimen number AM 455. The name Hortalotarsus derives from the Greek words hortalis 'young fowl' and tarsos 'tarsus', and refers to the preservation of a navicular bone that has not yet fused with the astragalus, as is the case in embryonic birds.

== Description ==
The surviving elements include the tibia, fibula, tarsals, metatarsals, and phalanges (toe bones). The tibia and fibula are still articulated (in their anatomical association); the tibia is 20 cm long. There are two rows of tarsals; the proximal (upper) row consists of the astragalus, the calcaneum, and, according to Seeley, a "small intermedium" (navicular bone), which he noted has not yet been identified in other saurischians. Broom, in 1906, agreed with the identification of the navicular bone. The distal (lower) row of tarsals are pressed onto the metatarsus below. According to Seeley, there were probably four bones bones in this row, three cuneiforms and the cuboid bone, although only the third cuneiform and the cuboid are preserved. The first digit is not preserved, and the second digit is only represented by an impression. Of the third digit, the metatarsal and a fragment of the first phalanx are preserved, while of the fourth digit, the metatarsal and three complete phalanges are preserved. The fifth digit is strongly reduced and consists of a single phalanx.

== Taxonomic history and status ==
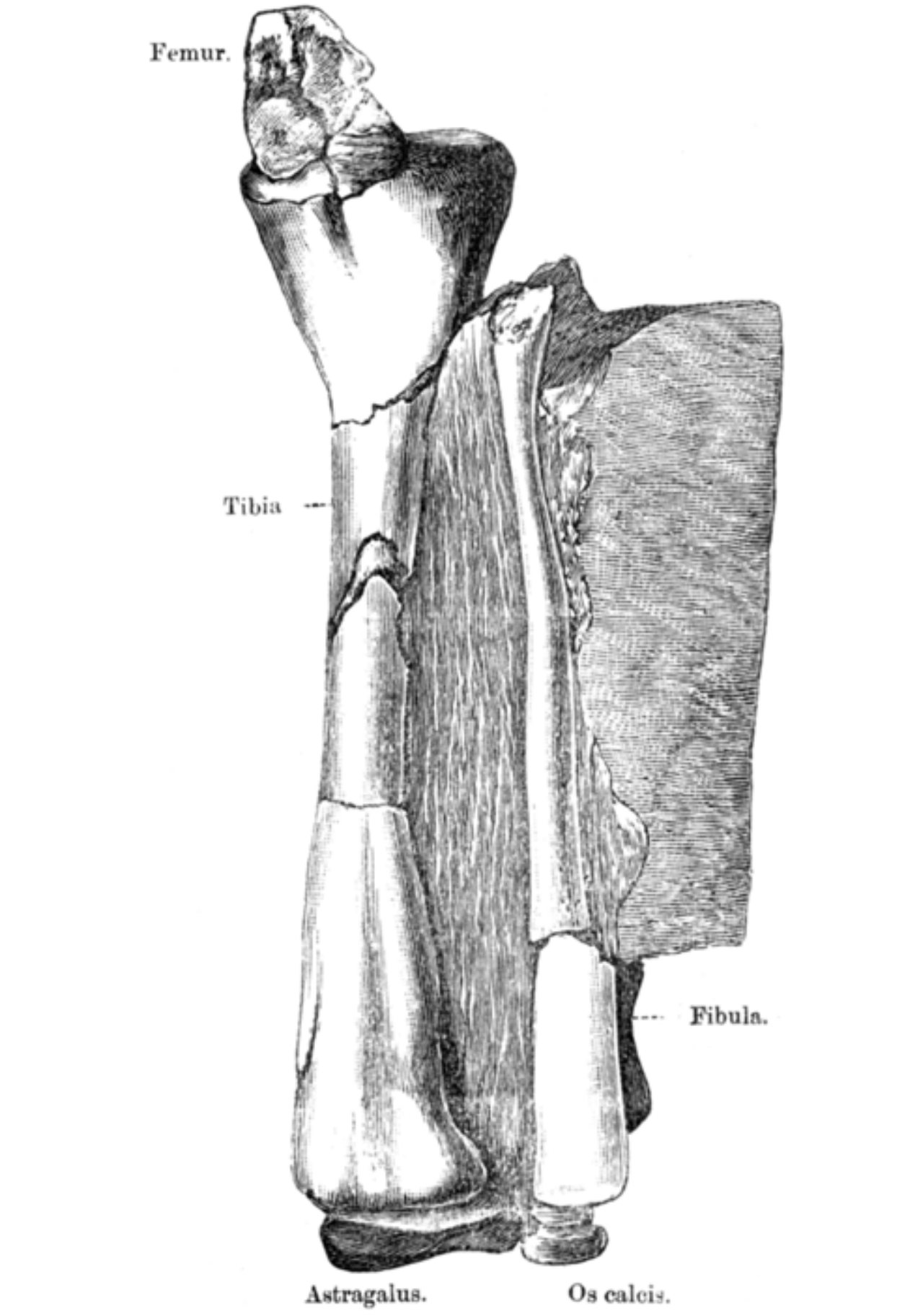
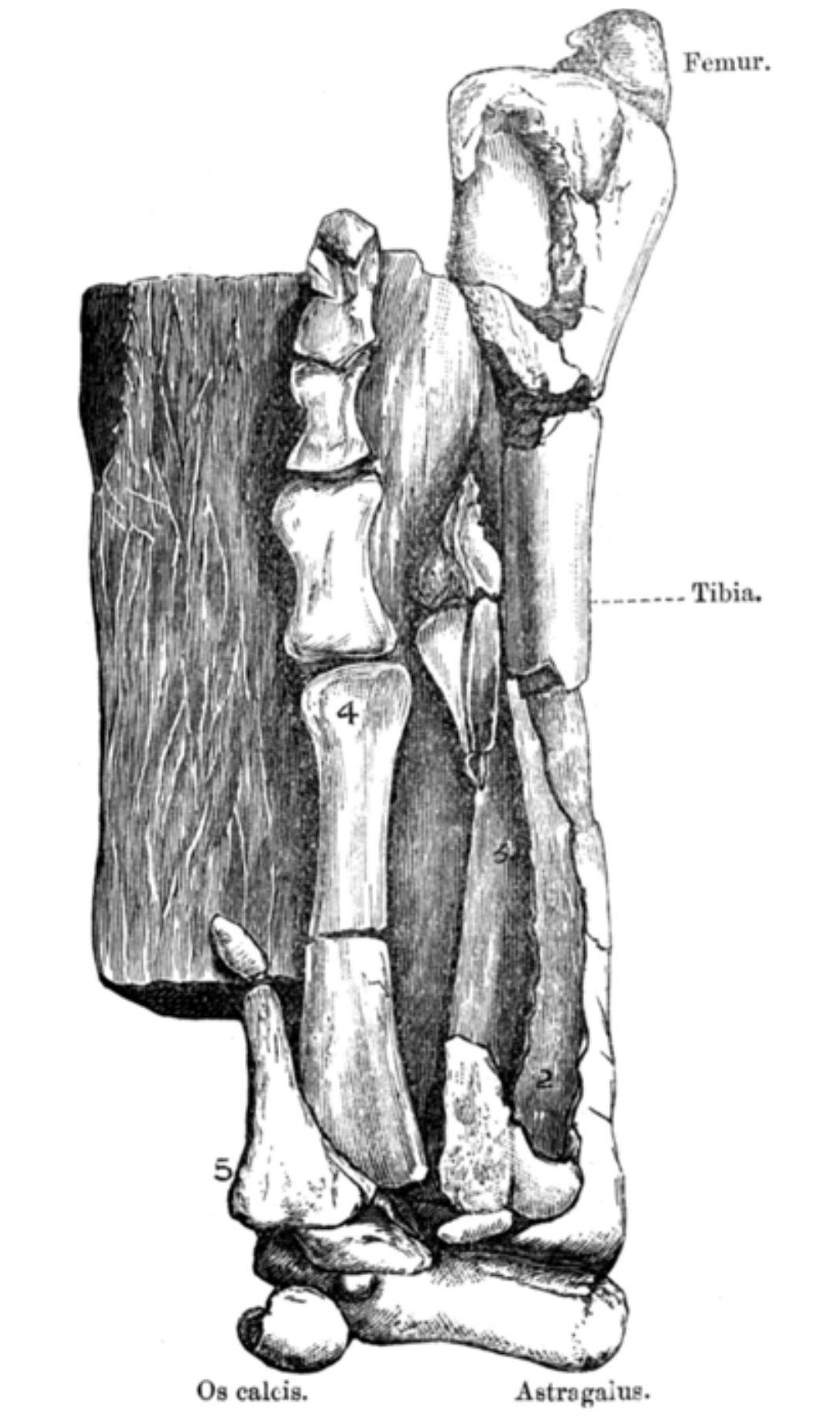
Original drawings by Harry Seeley (1894) showing the surviving specimen in posterior view (left) and anterior view (right)

Species today classified as basal sauropodomorphs have historically been classified as theropods until the mid-twentieth century. Seeley originally classified Hortalotarsus within the Euskelosauridae, and distinguished it from "Megalosaurian allies found in Europe" based on a notch in the articular surface of the tibia. He concluded that Hortalotarsus most closely resembled Dimodosaurus. In 1906, Broom noted many similarities with Anchisaurus from North America, and consequently placed Hortalotarsus in the Anchisauridae. Broom commented that Seeley's description was "very good" but that his figures were inaccurate and therefore provided updated drawings. Broom also assigned a second specimen to Hortalotarsus, which comprises most of the skeleton of what he identified as an immature individual. This specimen was discovered in Ladybrand and brought to the South African Museum in Capetown by Mr. Alex Moir. The specimen is preserved in a sandstone block, and many bones had been dissolved away, with only impressions remaining.

In 1906, Friedrich von Huene argued that Hortalotarsus is indistinguishable from the European genus Thecodontosaurus and consequently moved Hortalotarsus skirtopodus into this genus, creating the new combination Thecodontosaurus skirtopodus. He also assigned vertebrae to this species that were previously assigned to Massospondylus browni, as well as fossils from a 1886 collection from South Africa stored in the Kunsthistorisches Museum in Vienna. In 1911, Broom commented that if von Huene were correct in his assignment of Hortalotarsus skirtopodus to Thecodontosaurus, then the skeleton he himself had assigned to that species in 1906 "must be placed in a new genus". He then erected a new species for the specimen which is classified within the genus Gyposaurus, as Gyposaurus capensis. Von Huene maintained the name Thecodontosaurus skirtopodus in 1932. However, several other studies continued to use the name Hortalotarsus skirtopodus, which they classified within Anchisauridae. Rodney Steel, in 1970, stated that the fragment of a fibula from Zimbabwe described in 1916 can probably be assigned to this species.

In 1976, Peter Galton and Michael Albert Cluver argued that the assignment to Thecodontosaurus cannot be defended. While they concur with von Huene that the foot of Hortalotarsus cannot be distinguished from Thecodontosaurus, they point out that it can also not be distinguished from several other basal sauropodomorphs. Consequently, Hortalotarsus cannot be sufficiently diagnosed and is therefore an indeterminate Nomen dubium. Michael Cooper, in 1981, restudied the Hortalotarsus skirtopodus holotype specimen and concluded that it is indistinguishable from a juvenile specimen of Massospondylus carinatus, treating it as a synonym of that species. The two most recent reviews, those of Galton (1990) and Galton and Upchurch (2004), listed Hortalotarsus skirtopodus as an indeterminate sauropodomorph.
