= Egbert Cornelis Nicolaas van Hoepen =

Dutch-born South African paleontologist (1884–1966)

- Born: 10 November 1884; Vlissingen, Netherlands
- Died: 2 May 1966 (aged 81); Johannesburg, South Africa

Academic background
- Education: Delft University of Technology

Academic work
- Discipline: Paleontology
- Sub-discipline: Specialist on Invertebrate fossils from the Cretaceous strata of Zululand
- Institutions: Transvaal Museum; National Museum, Bloemfontein

Egbert Cornelis Nicolaas van Hoepen (10 November 1884 – 2 May 1966) was a Dutch-born South African paleontologist.

== Biography ==
Born at Vlissingen, around the age of six he moved with his parents to the South African Republic. When British forces occupied Pretoria in 1900 he was deported to the Netherlands, where he took classes and qualified as a mining engineer at the technical university in Delft. He later received his doctorate with a thesis on the structure of the Silurian strata of Gotland (1910). He then returned to South Africa, where from 1910 to 1921, he worked as a paleontologist at the Transvaal Museum. Within this time period, he focused his attention on fossil reptiles of the Karoo. From 1922 to 1950 he served as director of National Museum, Bloemfontein. He is credited with collecting thousands of invertebrate fossils from the Cretaceous strata of Zululand.

He died at Johannesburg.

== Taxa ==
He is the taxonomic authority of numerous fossil taxa, such as the therapsid family Pylaecephalidae and the mollusk family Megatrigoniidae. He also described the extinct reptile genera Pedeticosaurus and Eucnemesaurus, as well as the dicynodont genus Sintocephalus. In 1932 he circumscribed both Kolpochoerus, a prehistoric pig genus, and Megalotragus, an extinct antelope genus. Taxa with the specific epithet of vanhoepeni commemorate his name.

== Published works ==
He was the author of around 80 scientific writings, publishing works in the fields of archaeology and ethnology as well as in paleontology.

- "Contributions to the knowledge of the reptiles of the Karroo Formation. 6. Further dinosaurian material in the Transvaal Museum", Annals of the Transvaal Museum 7(2): 93-141.
