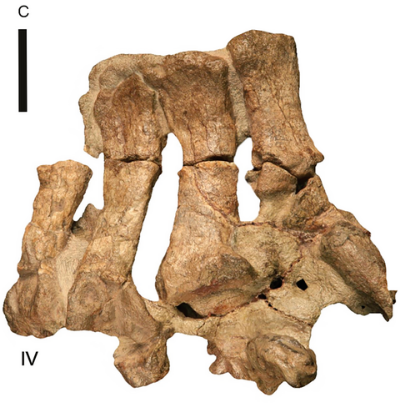
- Pes of E. entaxonis

Scientific classification
- Kingdom: Animalia
- Phylum: Chordata
- Class: Reptilia
- Clade: Dinosauria
- Clade: Saurischia
- Clade: †Sauropodomorpha
- Clade: †Riojasauridae
- Genus: †Eucnemesaurus; Hoepen, 1920

Species
- †E. fortis Hoepen, 1920; †E. entaxonis McPhee et al., 2015

Synonyms
- Aliwalia rex Galton, 1985

= Eucnemesaurus =

Eucnemesaurus Temporal range: Late Triassic, 220 Ma

Extinct genus of dinosaur of the Triassic in South Africa

Eucnemesaurus (/juːkˌniːmɪˈsɔːrəs/; meaning "good tibia lizard", for its robust tibiae) is a genus of basal sauropodomorph dinosaur known from partial fossilized remains from the Lower Elliot Formation of Late Triassic South Africa. Although once reclassified as a synonym of the similar prosauropod Euskelosaurus and later misidentified as the supposed herrerasaurid Aliwalia rex, recent studies have since reestablished Eucnemesaurus as a valid genus of sauropodomorph within its own family and described a second species attributed to the genus.

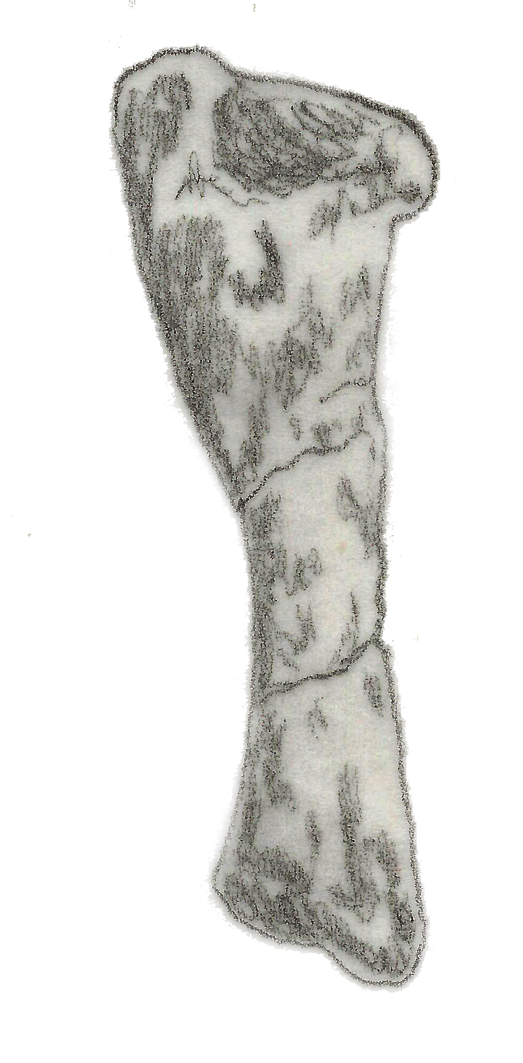
Illustration of the tibia from the E. fortis holotype

== History of study ==
Eucnemesaurus was named in 1920 by Egbert Cornelis Nicolaas van Hoepen, based on holotype TM 119, a partial skeleton including a complete tibia, partial femur and pubis, and fragmentary vertebrae. The remains were found by Van Hoepen in a deposit of the Lower Elliot Formation, dated to the Late Triassic (Norian to Rhaetian stages, 220 to 205 million years ago), on a farm in Slabberts, South Africa. The type species is Eucnemesaurus fortis, the specific name meaning "strong" in Latin. Van Hoepen identified the genus as a plateosaurid, though could not place it in a subfamily due to the fragmentary state of the specimen. Following a reanalysis of materials of Euskelosaurus and similar sauropodomorphs, however, Eucnemesaurus was later reassigned as a synonym of Euskelosaurus in 1979 by Jacques van Heerden.

Another femur specimen now assigned to Eucnemesaurus was also placed in separate genera, first in Euskelosaurus by Friedrich von Huene in 1906 and more specifically as part of the Euskelosaurus browni holotype by Michael Cooper in 1980, and later in a new genus and species, Aliwalia rex by Peter Galton in 1985. The specimen had been sent to the Naturhistorisches Museum in Vienna in 1873 alongside a maxillary fragment originally described as belonging to E. browni, but conducting his own comparative study, Galton believed the femur and maxilla represented a large herrerasaurid theropod, naming it Aliwalia rex, derived from the original excavation site’s location near Aliwal North, South Africa, and the Latin word for “king.” Although Aliwalia’s connection to Herrerasaurus was later questioned and an uncertain status accepted, the genus was nonetheless still considered a carnivorous theropod.

When another partial femur specimen recognizable as belonging to Aliwalia was discovered in 2003, paleontologists from the University of the Witwatersrand undertook a larger comparative study of multiple Lower Elliot Formation materials. The findings, published by Adam Yates in 2007, identified fossils from Euskelosaurus and Aliwalia that shared distinct features with Van Hoepen’s Eucnemesaurus holotype that were not present in other Lower Elliot Formation sauropodomorphs. Yates justified Eucnemesaurus as a valid genus and a senior synonym to Aliwalia, with several specimens from the Elliot Formation thus reassigned. The maxillary fragment associated with Aliwalia, lacking diagnostic features, was reclassified as an unspecified archosaur. Furthermore, the genus’ distinct features were also identified in Riojasaurus incertus, a Late Triassic sauropodomorph from Argentina, and Eucnemesaurus was situated in the subfamily Riojasauridae.

Since the resurrection of Eucnemesaurus as a valid genus, a new species, E. entaxonis, was described in 2015. The holotype, BP/1/6234, includes a vertebral column comprising most of the tail, partial pubic bones, a complete right femur and fragmented left, and a mostly-complete right foot. The remains were found on Cannon Rock Farm in the Aliwal North area, from a Late Triassic Lower Elliot Formation deposit, as with other Eucnemesaurus specimens. The species name refers to the “surprisingly robust foot architecture” in the specimen, in which the inner or medial digits bear most of the animal’s weight. Eucnemesaurus vertebral specimens have also been used in recent studies on how skeletal pneumaticity, a trait widespread among saurischian dinosaurs, developed in the earliest dinosaur genera.
