= Clarens Formation =

Geological formation in southern Africa

- Stratigraphic range: Pliensbachian-Toarcian; ~190–180 Ma
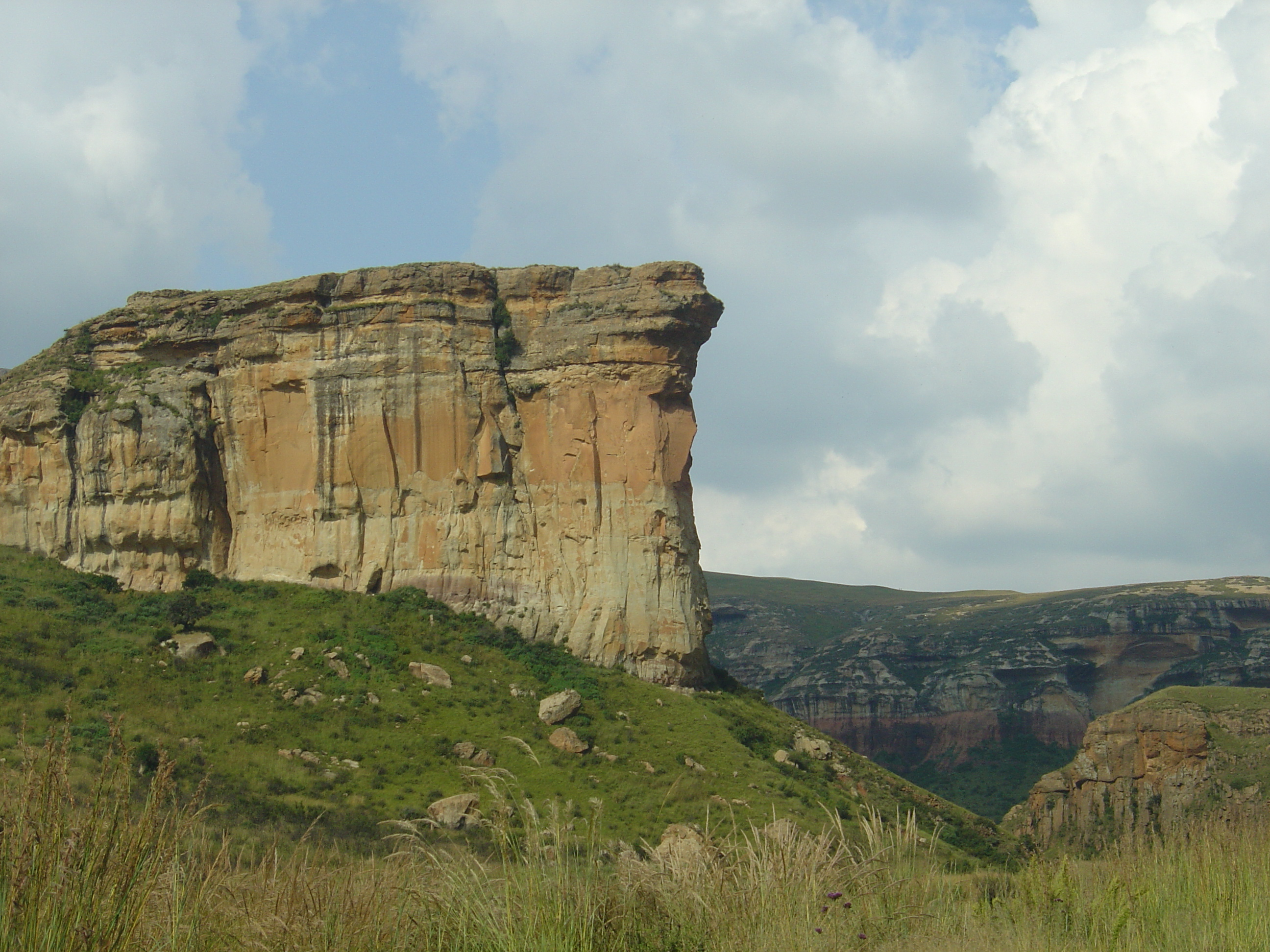
- Brandwag Rock in the Golden Gate Highlands National Park
- Type: Geological formation
- Unit of: Stormberg Group
- Sub-units: Lower Elliot and Upper Elliot
- Underlies: Drakensberg Group
- Overlies: Elliot Formation
- Thickness: up to 300 m (980 ft)

Lithology
- Primary: Sandstone, claystone
- Other: Mudstone, siltstone

Location
- Coordinates: 30.5°S 27.4°E
- Approximate paleocoordinates: 44.1°S 1.9°W
- Region: Free State, KwaZulu-Natal & Eastern Cape
- Country: South Africa; Lesotho

Type section
- Named for: Clarens, Free State
- Clarens Formation (South Africa)

The Clarens Formation is a geological formation found in several localities in Lesotho and in the Free State, KwaZulu-Natal, and Eastern Cape provinces in South Africa. It is the uppermost of the three formations found in the Stormberg Group of the greater Karoo Supergroup rocks and represents the final phase of preserved sedimentation of the Karoo Basin.

== Geology ==
The Clarens Formation is composed nearly entirely of fine to medium-grained, thickly-bedded sandstones that range from pale orange or pinkish to cream in color. It is characterized by its remarkable gross lithological uniformity and that its deposits mainly outcrop as high cliffs. These Clarens Formation cliffs frequently contain shallow caves and overhangs at the contact of the underlying Upper Elliot Formation (UEF) due to processes of erosion. This particular feature of the Clarens Formation lead to the initial naming of these rocks the “Cave Sandstone” in older literature. It is thought that the geographical range of the Clarens Formation was much greater millions of years ago, covering most of southern Africa in a vast sand dune environment which stretched out from the main Karoo Basin westwards into Namibia and into Zimbabwe in the northeast.

There has been very little recent research undertaken on Clarens Formation, but overall, due to the dominant nature of the sandstones, the Clarens Formation is considered to have been deposited in an arid climate where dune fields were abundant. The Clarens Formation deposits have been categorized into three notable sedimentary facies. These are laid out below:

- Basal Zone 1: This facies is located in the lower or older sections of the Clarens Formation, and always have eroded bases at their contact with the underlying Upper Elliot Formation (UEF). The sandstones in this facies zones are thickly-bedded, massive, are fine-grained and are silt-rich. Minor mudstone lenses are also found within the sandstone layers and often exhibit desiccation cracks. These are interbedded with lenticular sandstones that contain various ripple structures, calcareous concretions and clay-pellet conglomerates. These have been interpreted as loess deposits. Various trace fossils are found in the mudstone layers of the Basal Zone 1.
- Middle Zone 2: The middle section of the Clarens Formation exhibit either massive or large-scale planar or cross trough bedding structures, and in some instances minor herringbone cross bedding. The sandstones are well sorted and the grain size is coarser than that found in the lower deposits. The sandstones from this facies and up are composed either of quartz arenites or greywackes. Scour and fill structures, and scour marks are also commonly observed in the upper sandstone deposits. These sedimentary facies have been interpreted as preserved sheet flood and ephemeral stream deposits, as well as playa lakes that were formed in a proper desert environment.
- Upper Zone 3: In the upper sections of the Clarens Formation, silty sandstones reappear which grade laterally into fine-grained, massive, and immature sandstone beds. These massive sandstones contain quartz-rich feldspathic wackes and subordinate arkosic arenites. Other minerals identified - which are found in all sandstones across the entire Clarens Formation - are zircons, garnets, agates, riebeckite, spinel, sphene, and hornblende. Thin, lenticular sandstones also reappear in the uppermost Clarens Formation, as do ripple marks and clay-pellet conglomerates, which reveals that the environment where these sedimentary rocks were formed was similar or the same as that of Basal Zone 1. Minor basalts begin to appear in the uppermost sections of the Clarens Formation which are interpreted as the commencement of the magmatic activity associated with the Drakensberg Group. The appearance of the basalts signals the termination of the sedimentation of the Karoo Basin. Extremely rare occurrences of shallow water structures have been found in the basaltic deposits.

== Palaeontology ==
Paleontological finds of the Clarens Formation are less common than the underlying Upper Elliot Formation (UEF), but this is likely not a true reflection of the species diversity that was present at the time of deposition. Fossils are more well known from its lower facies zones, however, no systematic biostratigraphic mapping of the Clarens Formation has been undertaken to date. This is partly due to the fact that the uppermost sections of the Clarens Formation are difficult and dangerous to access due to these deposits forming steep cliffs. Nevertheless, various vertebrate and invertebrate fossils have been recovered from its lower sections. Vertebrate fossil material generally comprises dis-articulated or isolated bone material of various theropod, sauropodomorph, and ornithischian dinosaurs, crocodylomorphs, and cynodont therapsids; one dinosaur from the Clarens Formation has been named Hortalotarsus skirtopodus. Freshwater fish fossils such as that of Semionotus capensis, and crustaceans have been found in the playa lake facies deposits. The Clarens Formation is also well known for its numerous preserved dinosaur trackways of both large and small theropods, and also of small ornithischian dinosaurs. Petrified wood fragments, rhizoliths, coprolites, and planolites burrows have also been found.

== Correlation ==
The Clarens Formation corresponds with numerous localities in Sub-Saharan Africa. It is currently considered to correlate in age with the Forest Sandstone of Zimbabwe, the Bodibeng Sandstone in the Tuli Basin of Botswana, and the Etjo Sandstone of Namibia. In South Africa, equivalent sedimentary facies to the Clarens Formation are present in the Lebombo Belt, north of Eswatini.

== See also ==
- List of fossiliferous stratigraphic units in South Africa
- List of fossil sites
