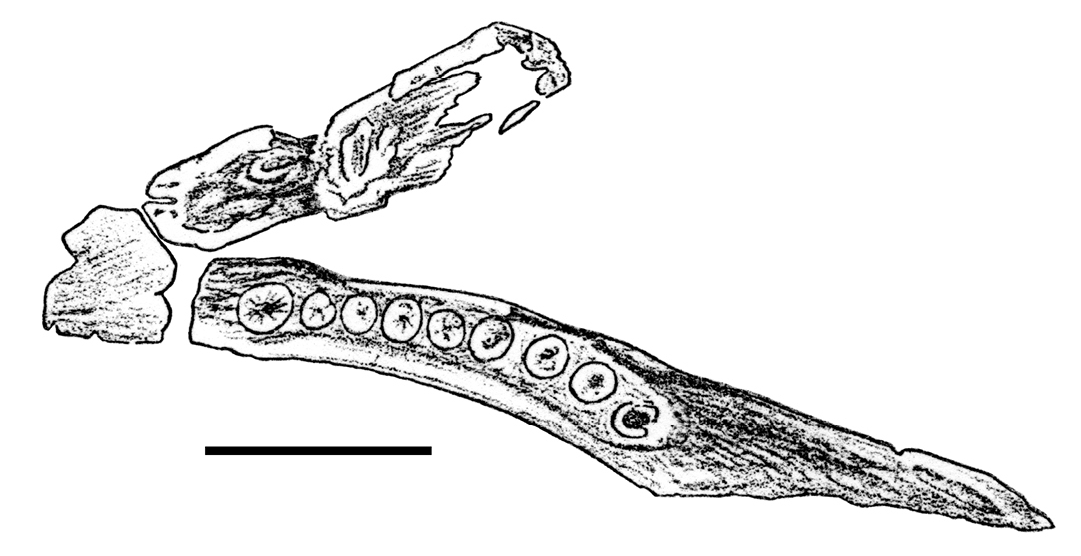
- Holotype jaw

Scientific classification
- Kingdom: Animalia
- Phylum: Chordata
- Class: Reptilia
- Clade: Dinosauria
- Clade: †Ornithischia
- Family: †Heterodontosauridae
- Genus: †Geranosaurus; Broom, 1911

Type species
- †Geranosaurus atavus Broom, 1911

= Geranosaurus =

Geranosaurus Temporal range: Early Jurassic, 191.1–187.5 Ma

Extinct genus of dinosaurs

Geranosaurus is a genus of heterodontosaurid ornithischian dinosaur that lived during the Early Jurassic, between 191.1 and 187.5 million years ago. It is known from a single species, G. atavus, that was named in 1911 by Robert Broom for partial jaws found during road-cutting in South Africa. The genus name is likely derived from the word for "crane" in reference to the bird-like limb bones, while the species name means "ancestor" likely in reference to its position as an early ornithischian. The limited material and poor preservation of Geranosaurus have rendered it difficult to diagnose, with authors accepting it as a dubious name though differentiable from its relative Heterodontosaurus, the only other heterodontosaurid known from the Clarens Formation.

Due to its incomplete nature, Geranosaurus has not always been recognized as a heterodontosaurid. When it was first named, the sediments it came from were believed to be Triassic in age, making Geranosaurus the only recognized Triassic ornithischian. Subsequently, the genera Heterodontosaurus and Fabrosaurus were named, and Lycorhinus was recognized as an ornithischian, displaying that a diverse fauna of early ornithischians and other dinosaurs was present in the Early Jurassic of South Africa. Heterodontosaurids including Geranosaurus have been treated as relatives of various ornithischian groups, or as the earliest family of ornithischians, and are also debated to have been herbivorous or omnivorous based upon the caniniform teeth present in the jaws of all members.

== History and naming ==
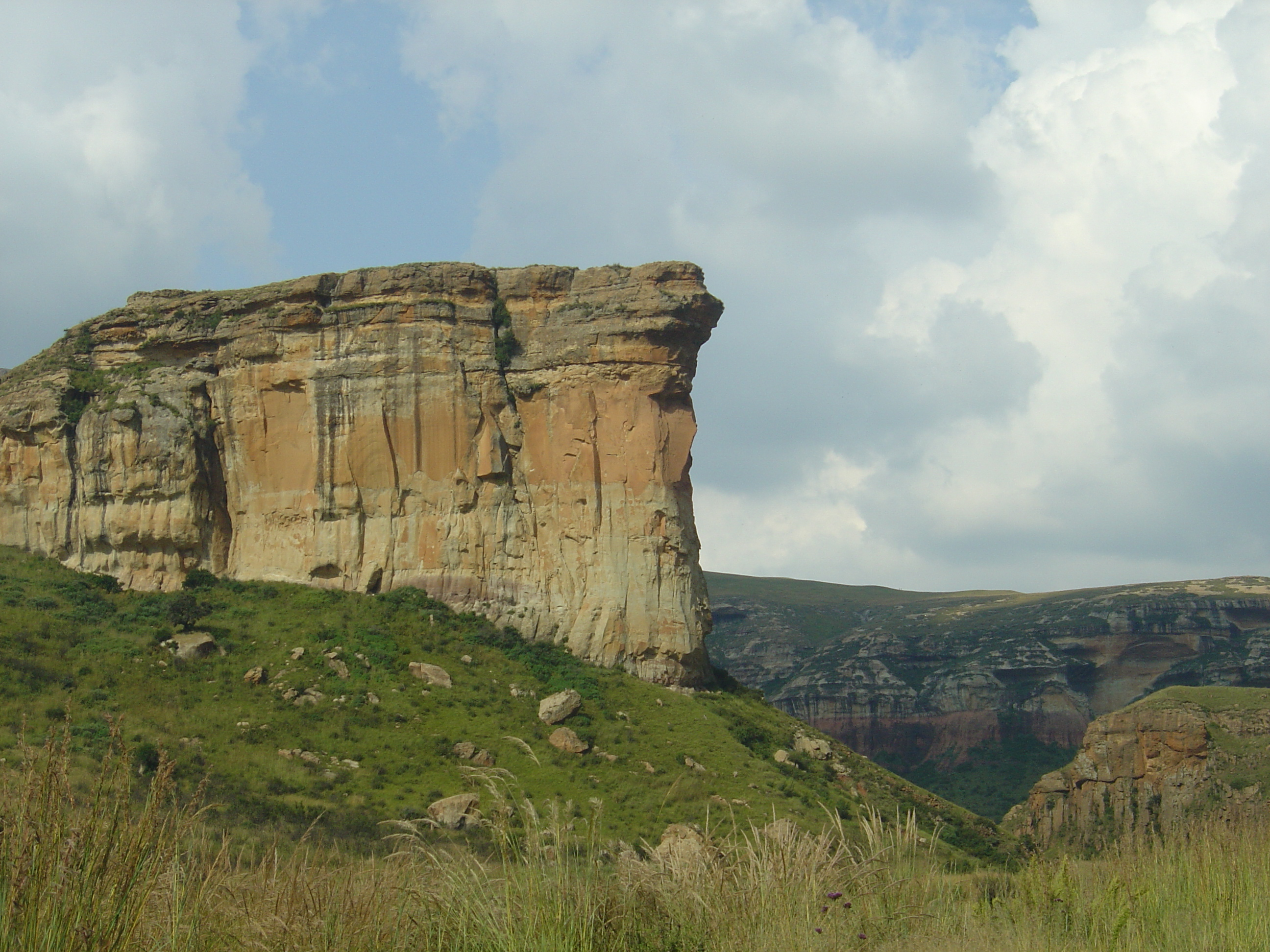
Brandwag in Golden Gate Highlands National Park showing the cliffs of the Clarens Formation

During the road-cutting of Barkly Pass in Eastern Cape, South Africa, road engineer George Mandy collected the remains of a small dinosaur, including badly crushed fragments of the skull, partial limb bones, and vertebrae. These fossils were acquired by the South African Museum and subsequently described in 1911 by South African palaeontologist Robert Broom. Broom found that the fossils represented the earliest known member of Predentata and gave them the name Geranosaurus atavus, though he was uncertain if all the bones were from a single individual and as a result treated the partial skull as the holotype. No etymology for the name was provided by Broom, but for the species name the Latin word atavus means "ancestor" likely referencing its position as an early ornithischian, and the genus name geranos is Ancient Greek for "crane" likely in reference to the bird-like limb bones. The holotype bears the collection number SAM-PK-1871, while the poorly preserved partial hindlimb is numbered as SAM-PK-1857. The vertebrae were believed to be too large to be from the same individual as the skull, but are now lost.

The discovery of Geranosaurus was interpreted by Broom as being within the Cave Sandstone of the Stormberg Series, Early Jurassic in age. Though it had previously been considered Triassic, even an Early Jurassic age would make Geranosaurus the oldest ornithischian. The "Cave Sandstone" is now known as the Clarens Formation, with the approximate coordinates of the locality along the road cutting being 31°27′S 27°51′E placing Geranosaurus within the lower portion of the formation. Uranium-lead dating of the top of the Clarens Formation and top of the underlying Elliot Formation give the former a mainly Pliensbachian age between 191.1 and 187.5 million years ago.

== Description ==
Geranosaurus was around 0.6 metres (2.0 ft) tall and around 1.2 metres (3.9 ft) long when fully grown. The only known specimen is poorly preserved, hindering comparisons to other heterodontosaurids, but several key features can be identified. Teeth from the maxilla were originally described as chisel-shaped with faint ridges, though they have singe broken off. The predentary is a simple wedge without a middle process, the dentary shows that the first tooth was enlarged into a canine (though it has also been damaged), and there are no replacement foramina along the tooth rows, all of which are shared with other heterodontosaurids. It is possible that there is no arched diastema between the premaxilla and maxilla, but this region is damaged, and an inset tooth row is also possible though interpretation is limited. The presence of a canine separates Geranosaurus from Abrictosaurus, and the absence of a gap between the canine and later teeth separated it from Heterodontosaurus and Lycorhinus. Only eight teeth were present in curved toothrow of the dentary, fewer than the count of 11 or 12 in Heterodontosaurus and Abrictosaurus. The lack of clear unique features of Geranosaurus and limited material renders it difficult to diagnose, though it is distinguishable from the only other heterodontosaurid known from the Clarens Formation, Heterodontosaurus.

== Classification ==
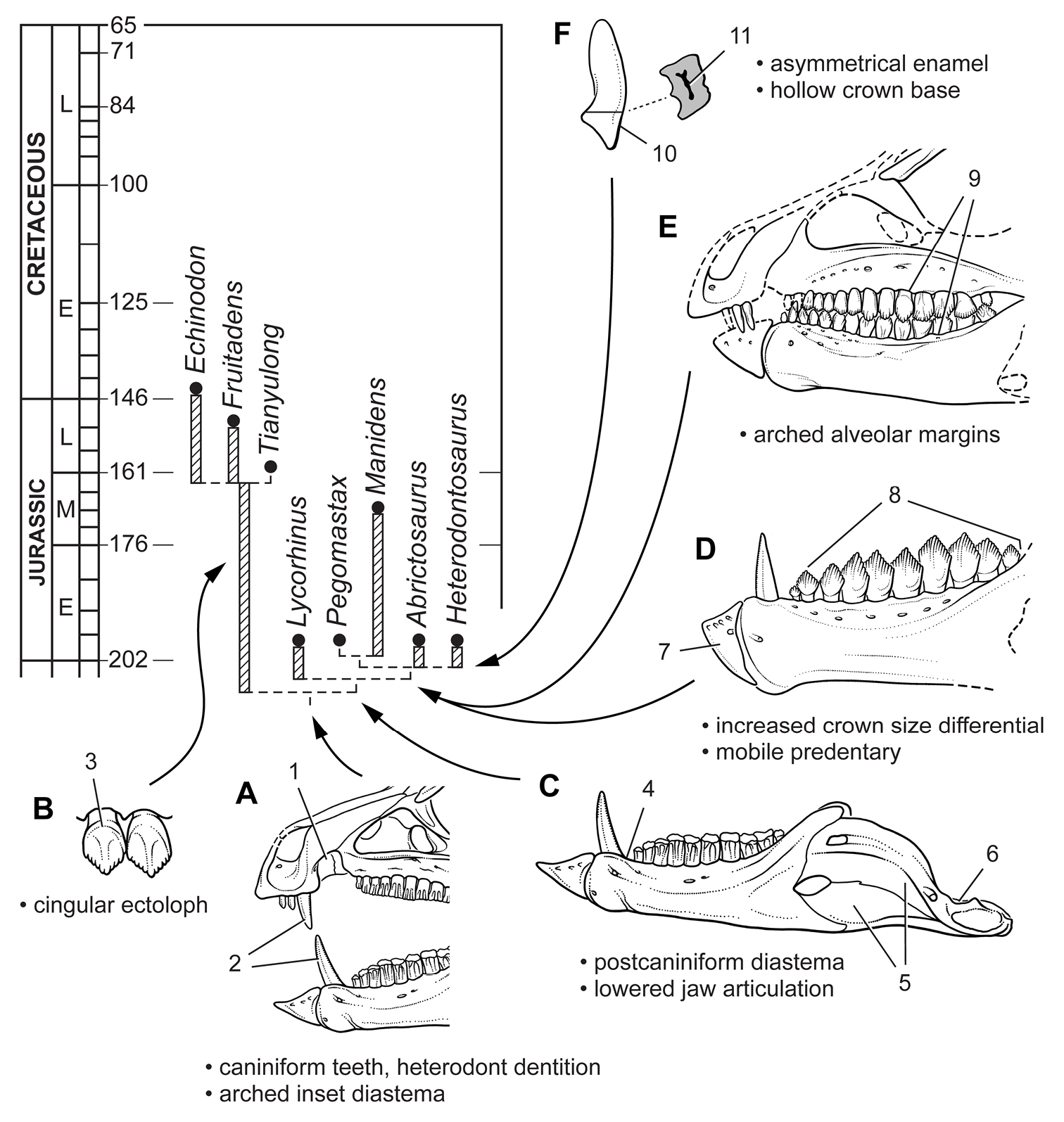
Evolution of key masticatory specializations in heterodontosaurids according to Sereno

Geranosaurus has long been recognized as an ornithischian dinosaur on account of its predentary, being the earliest known when first named. Poposaurus was suggested to be an early ornithischian alongside it in 1921, but was removed as a theropod in 1961. The second definitive early ornithischian Heterodontosaurus was named in 1962, and alongside it Lycorhinus was recognized as an ornithischian for the first time. All three genera were comparable in tooth anatomy, and from the same Triassic to Jurassic deposits of South Africa. The genus Fabrosaurus was also described in 1964 as an ornithischian from the same deposits, though Geranosaurus and Heterodontosaurus were distinguished from it and placed in Ornithopoda. The family Heterodontosauridae was named simultaneously in 1966 by Oskar Kuhn and Alfred Sherwood Romer, both of whom only placed Heterodontosaurus in it and left Geranosaurus as an indeterminate early ornithopod or a possible hypsilophodontid respectively. In 1970 Richard Thulborn first proposed Geranosaurus and Heterodontosaurus were related, separating the South African ornithischians into "fabrosaurs" and Hypsilophodontidae (which included both genera). Peter M. Galton disagreed with the expansive Hypsilophodontidae of Thulborn and instead removed Heterodontosaurus, Geranosaurus, and Lycorhinus into Heterodontosauridae in 1972, proposing they were close to the origins of Ornithopoda but more derived than members of Fabrosauridae (Fabrosaurus and Echinodon). Heterodontosaurids have since been classified as early ornithopods, relatives of pachycephalosaurs, relatives of Marginocephalia, or a group of early ornithischians.

Through a suite of characteristics of the skull and teeth, including canines, a simple predentary, and an arched gap between the premaxilla and maxilla, Heterodontosauridae is accepted to include eight diagnostic genera, possibly Pisanosaurus, and Geranosaurus. Lycorhinus, Heterodontosaurus, Abrictosaurus and Pegomastax are known from South Africa, Echinodon is known from England, Manidens is known from Argentina, Fruitadens is known from the USA, and Tianyulong is known from China. Additional undescribed material is known from the Kayenta Formation of the USA, and doubtful specimens from Argentina and China are also known. It is possible that the genera from Gondwana form the clade Heterodontosaurinae to the exclusion of genera from Laurasia based on tooth anatomy. Geranosaurus itself has not been analyzed phylogenetically, but has been suggested that on the basis of an enlarged dentary caniniform, which is a synapomorphy of Heterodontosauridae, and no post-caniniform diastema, which excludes it from Heterodontosaurinae, it was an early heterodontosaurid and possibly diagnostic through this combination of traits.

== Palaeobiology ==
=== Diet and canine function ===
Heterodontosaurids have traditionally been assumed to be herbivorous, alongside all other ornithischians, with the possibilities that the caniniforms were a part of sexual dimorphism based on their absence in Abrictosaurus, which was suggested to be a young or female version of another taxon. Paul Barrett suggested in 2000 that the premaxillary teeth and dentary canine were indications of heterodontosaurids being omnivorous, while Richard J. Butler and colleagues suggested in 2008 that they were likely used for defense and occasional omnivory, and Laura B. Porro and colleagues suggested in 2010 that the caniniforms were an indication of a diet of more tough, fibrous vegetation. David B. Norman and colleagues suggested in 2011 alternatively that the canines were unlikely to have been used for display or cropping and rooting vegetation, as there was no wear from use present and no strong evidence for sexual variation. However, Paul Sereno identified wear facets on the canines of Heterodontosaurus and some other heterodontosaurids. As well, Sereno pointed out that many modern animals have features for display or defense that are identical between sexes, so the use of canines for either could not be ruled out. Sereno considered the canines of heterodontosaurids to be most similar to those of peccaries in form, and suggested that their diet of fruits, roots, grass, acorns, pine nuts and thistles may represent the closest living comparison to heterodontosaurids.

=== Ecology ===
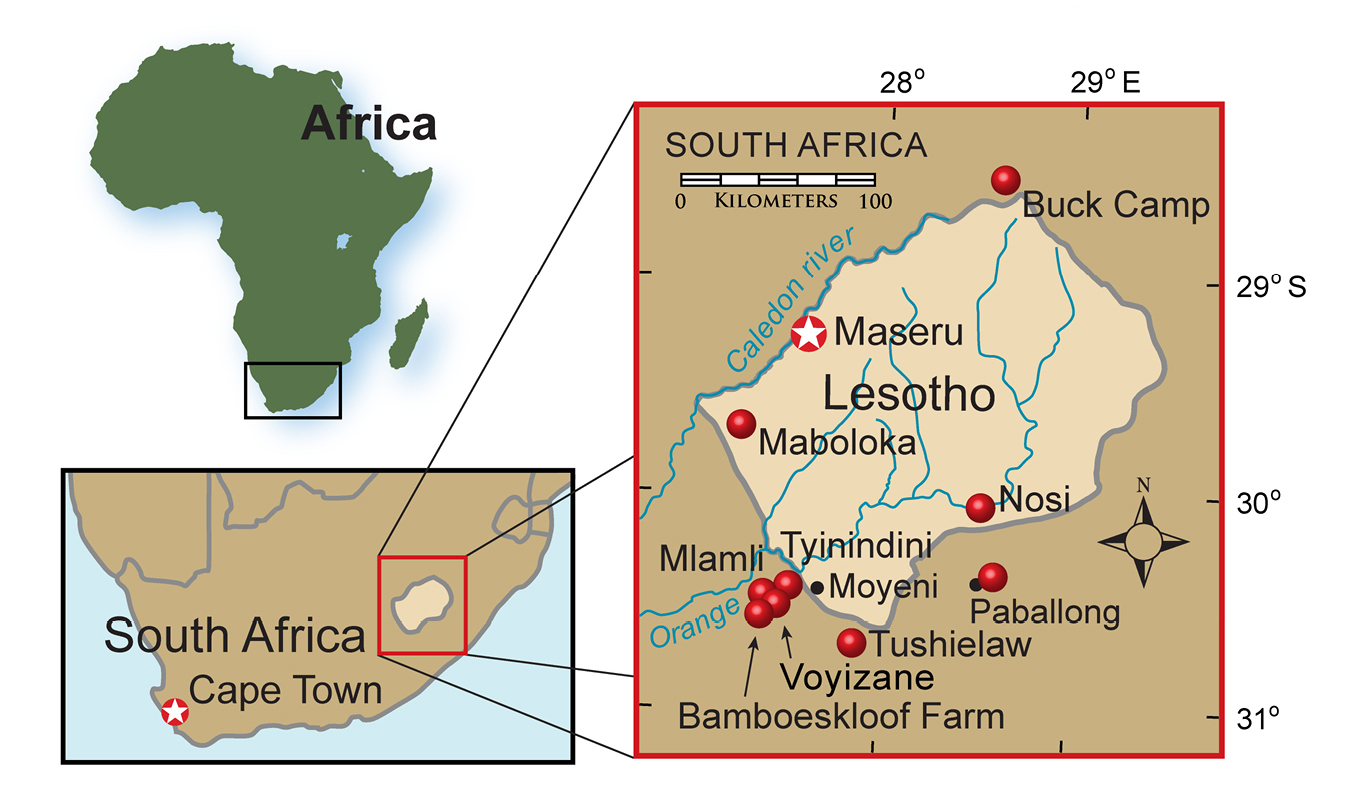
Map of heterodontosaurid localities within the Elliot and Clarens Formations of South Africa and Lesotho

Geranosaurus and related Heterodontosaurus have both been found within the Clarens Formation, previously known as the Cave Sandstone. This formation is predominantly composed of cream-coloured playa or aeolian landform sandstone deposited during the Early Jurassic. Contrasting with the diverse fauna known from the Upper Elliot Formation below, including the heterodontosaurids Heterodontosaurus, Lycorhinus, Abrictosaurus and Pegomastax, the Clarens Formation is much less fossiliferous and more inaccessible due to its cliff-forming nature. Two indeterminate heterodontosaurid skulls are also known from the Clarens Formation that were provisionally compared with Lycorhinus but may belong to a different taxon. Fossils in the formation are primarily from the lower subdivision, 20 to 30 m (66 to 98 ft) of thick and well-bedded sandstones and siltstones with some concretions and caves forming near the contact with the underlying Elliot Formation. Continuous and gradual aridification of the region of South Africa from the Upper Elliot Formation continued into the Clarens, which was ultimately formed by wet and dry deserts with large and eastward migrating sand dunes.

The faunal content of the Clarens Formation is largely the same as the older Upper Elliot Formation, with many similar or identical taxa between the two. Both the Upper Elliot and the Clarens are considered part of the Massospondylus Assemblage Zone, defined by the continuous presence of the sauropodomorph. Within this assemblage zone, 58.7% of all fossils are from sauropodomorphs, with 27.1% being eucynodonts and only 5.9% coming from ornithischians. Sauropodomorphs are represented within the Clarens specifically by Massospondylus and Ngwevu, and the ornithischians Lesothosaurus, Heterodontosaurus, Lycorhinus and Geranosaurus have been found up to the beginning of the formation or within it, but no theropods have yet been found younger than the Upper Elliot Formation. Crocodylomorphs are represented by Sphenosuchus, Notochampsa, and Pedeticosaurus, and sphenosuchians are represented by Clevosaurus. Clarens synapsids include Diarthrognathus, Pachygenelus, Tritylodontoides, and Erythrotherium. Fishes are also known, identified as Endemichthys, Semionotus, and Daedalichthys. Though the abundance of body fossils is lower than the Elliot Formation, a comparable diversity is still known, freshwater crustaceans and insects are known from both body fossils and trace fossils such as simple burrows and gastropod trails. Fossil trackways of arthropods and especially theropods are known and found throughout the unit. Fragments of plant fossils are also known, from sphenophytes and conifers, as well as petrified wood with growth rings.
