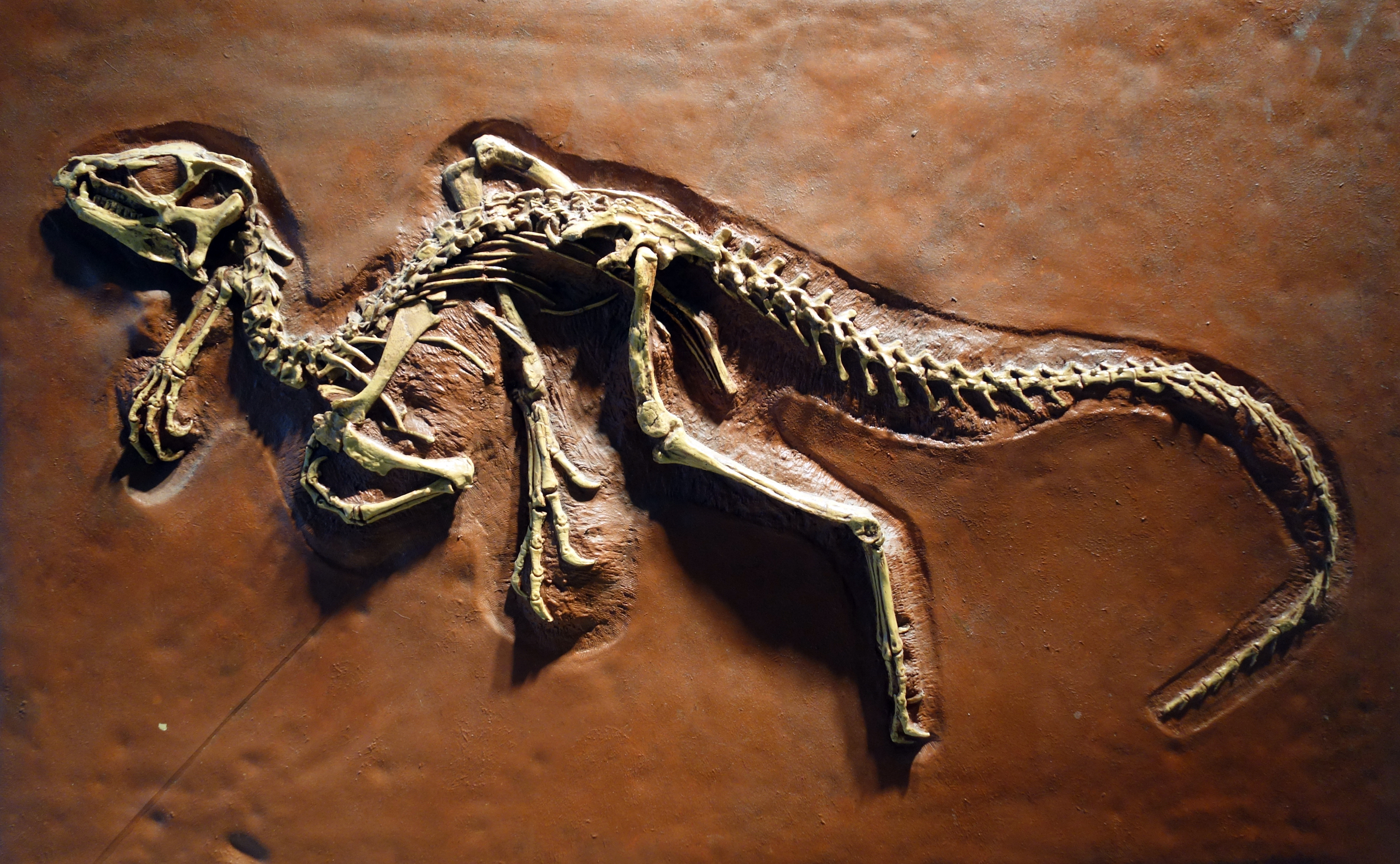
- Cast of specimen SAM-PK-K1332 of Heterodontosaurus tucki, University of California Museum of Palaeontology

Scientific classification
- Kingdom: Animalia
- Phylum: Chordata
- Class: Reptilia
- Clade: Dinosauria
- Clade: †Ornithischia
- Clade: †Saphornithischia
- Family: †Heterodontosauridae; Romer, 1966 (Kuhn, 1966)

Subgroups
- †Echinodon; †Fruitadens; †Geranosaurus; †Tianyulong; †Heterodontosaurinae Sereno, 2012; †Abrictosaurus; †Heterodontosaurus; †Lycorhinus; †Manidens; †Pegomastax

= Heterodontosauridae =

Heterodontosaurids Temporal range: Early Jurassic – Early Cretaceous, 200–140 Ma Possible Late Triassic record

Extinct family of dinosaurs

Heterodontosauridae is a family of ornithischian dinosaurs that were likely among the most basal (primitive) members of the group. Their phylogenetic placement is uncertain but they are most commonly found outside of the group Genasauria. Although their fossils are relatively rare and their group small in numbers, they have been found on all continents except Australia and Antarctica, with a range spanning the Early Jurassic to the Early Cretaceous.

Heterodontosaurids were fox-sized dinosaurs less than 2 metres (6.6 feet) in length, including a long tail. They are known mainly for their characteristic teeth, including enlarged canine-like tusks and cheek teeth adapted for chewing, analogous to those of Cretaceous hadrosaurids. Their diet was herbivorous or possibly omnivorous.

== Description ==
Size comparison of many heterodontosaurids

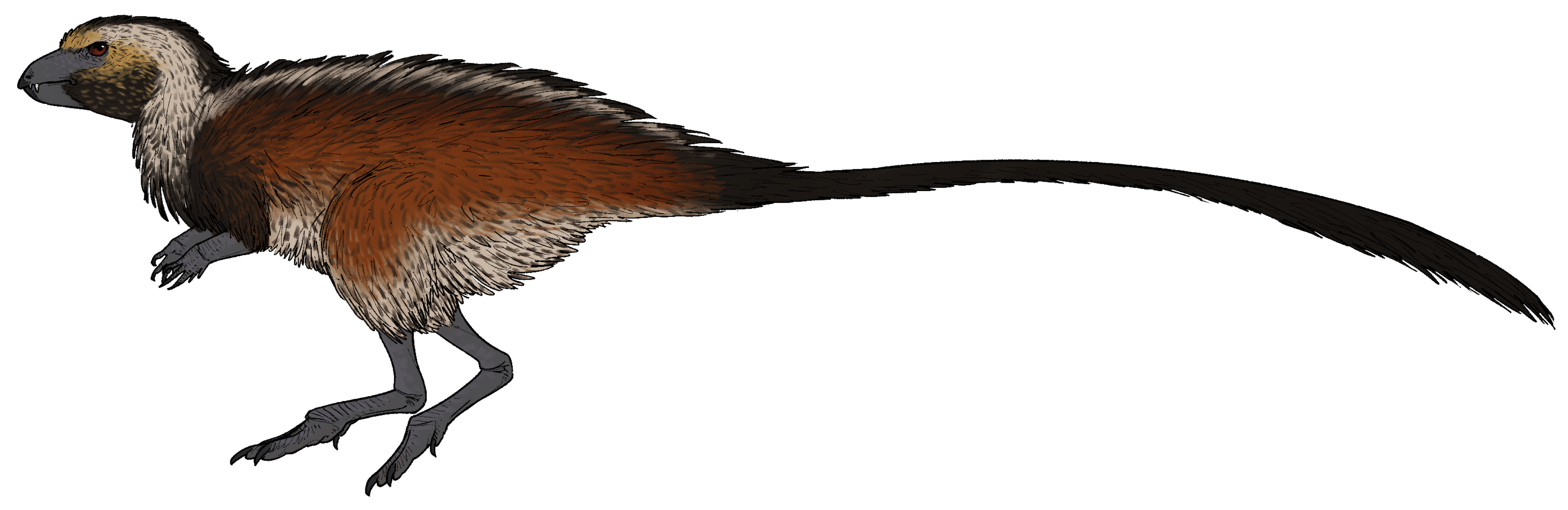
Life restoration of Tianyulong, showing filamentous integument known from the taxon

Among heterodontosaurids, only Heterodontosaurus itself is known from a complete skeleton. Fragmentary skeletal remains of Abrictosaurus are known but have not been fully described, while most other heterodontosaurids are known only from jaw fragments and teeth. Consequently, most heterodontosaurid synapomorphies (defining features) have been described from the teeth and jaw bones. Heterodontosaurus measured just over 1 meter (3.3 ft) in length, while the fragmentary remains of Lycorhinus may indicate a larger individual.

Tianyulong from China appears to preserve filamentous integument which has been interpreted to be a variant of the proto-feathers found in some theropods. These filaments include a crest along its tail. The presence of this filamentous integument has been used to suggest that both ornithischians and saurischians were endothermic.

=== Skull and teeth ===
Both Abrictosaurus and Heterodontosaurus had very large eyes. Underneath the eyes, the jugal bone projected sideways, a feature also present in ceratopsians. As in the jaws of most ornithischians, the anterior edge of the premaxilla (a bone at the tip of the upper jaw) was toothless and probably supported a keratinous beak (rhamphotheca), although heterodontosaurids did have teeth in the posterior section of the premaxilla. A large gap, called a diastema, separated these premaxillary teeth from those of the maxilla (the main upper jaw bone) in many ornithischians, but this diastema was characteristically arched in heterodontosaurids. The mandible (lower jaw) was tipped by the predentary, a bone unique to ornithischians. This bone also supported a beak similar to the one found on the premaxilla. All the teeth in the lower jaw were found on the dentary bone.

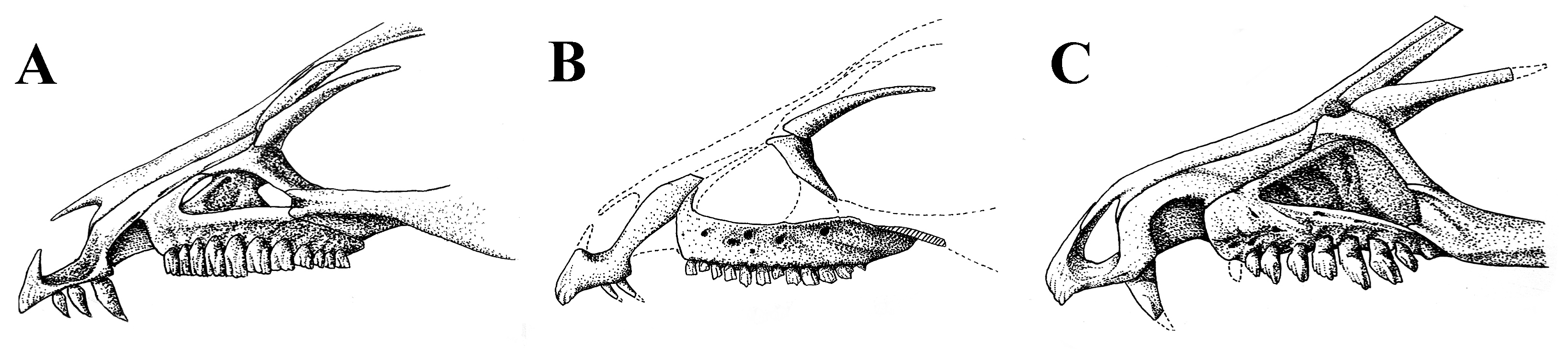
Snouts of Heterodontosaurus (A), Abrictosaurus (B), and Tianyulong (C)

Heterodontosaurids are named for their strongly heterodont dentition. There were three premaxillary teeth. In the Early Jurassic Abrictosaurus, Heterodontosaurus, and Lycorhinus, the first two premaxillary teeth were small and conical, while the much larger third tooth resembled the canines of carnivoran mammals and is often called the caniniform or 'tusk'. A lower caniniform, larger than the upper, took the first position in the dentary and was accommodated by the arched diastema of the upper jaw when the mouth was closed. These caniniforms were serrated on both the anterior and posterior edges in Heterodontosaurus and Lycorhinus, while those of Abrictosaurus bore serrations only on the anterior edge. In the Early Cretaceous Echinodon, there may have been two upper caniniforms, which were on the maxilla rather than the premaxilla, and Fruitadens from the Late Jurassic may have had two lower caniniforms on each dentary.

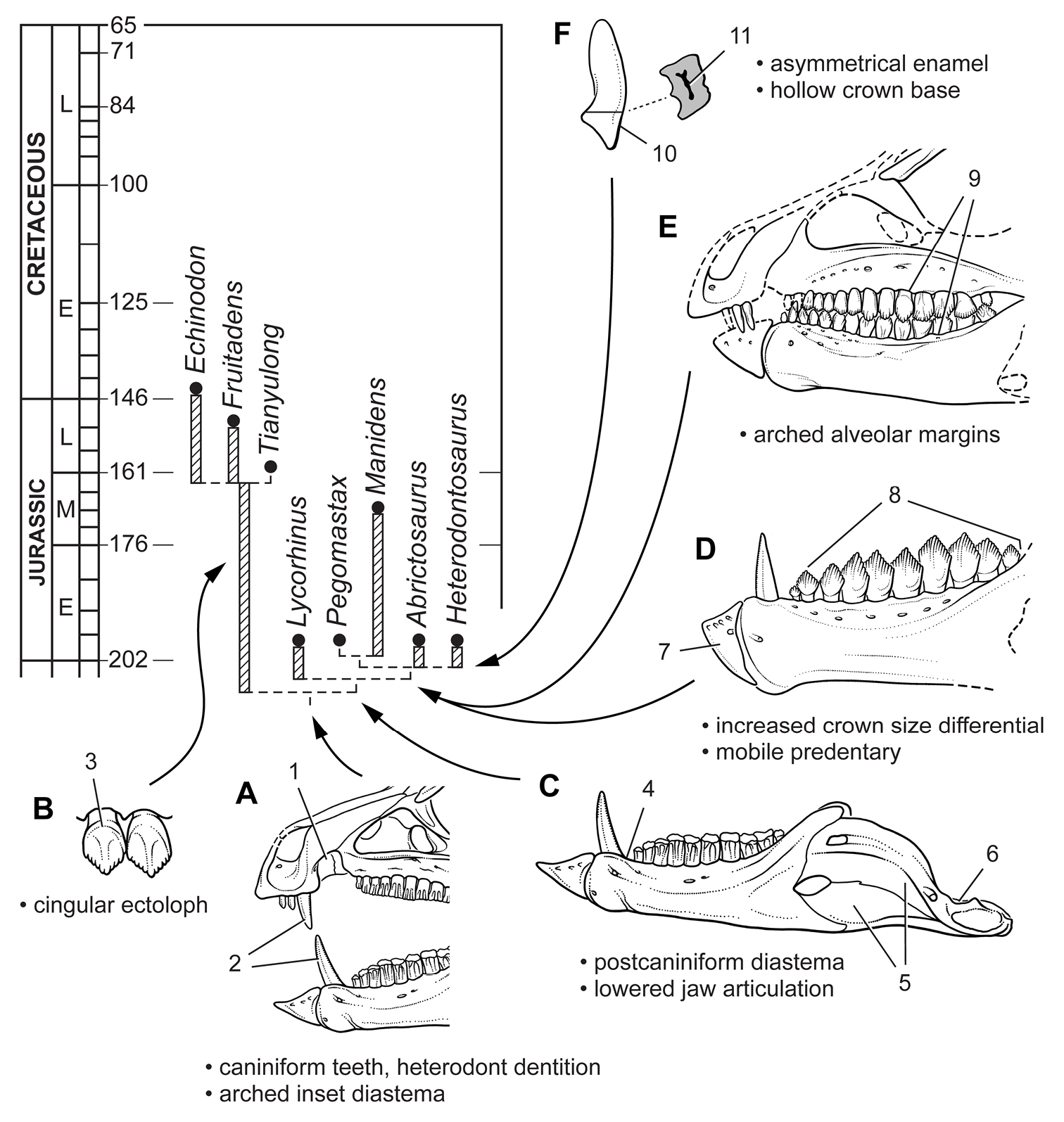
Evolution of key masticatory specializations in heterodontosaurids, according to Sereno, 2012

Like the characteristic tusks, the cheek teeth of derived heterodontosaurids were also unique among early ornithischians. Small ridges, or denticles, lined the edges of ornithischian cheek teeth in order to crop vegetation. These denticles extend only a third of the way down the tooth crown from the tip in all heterodontosaurids; in other ornithischians, the denticles extend further down towards the root. Basal forms like Abrictosaurus had cheek teeth in both maxilla and dentary that were generally similar to other ornithischians: widely spaced, each having a low crown and a strongly-developed ridge (cingulum) separating the crown from the root. In more derived forms like Lycorhinus and Heterodontosaurus, the teeth were chisel-shaped, with much higher crowns and no cingula, so that there was no difference in width between the crowns and the roots.

These derived cheek teeth were overlapping, so that their crowns formed a continuous surface on which food could be chewed. The tooth rows were slightly inset from the side of the mouth, leaving a space outside the teeth that may have been bounded by a muscular cheek, which would have been necessary for chewing. The hadrosaurs and ceratopsians of the Cretaceous Period, as well as many herbivorous mammals, would convergently evolve somewhat analogous dental batteries. As opposed to hadrosaurs, which had hundreds of teeth constantly being replaced, tooth replacement in heterodontosaurids occurred far more slowly and several specimens have been found without a single replacement tooth in waiting. Characteristically, heterodontosaurids lacked the small openings (foramina) on the inside of the jaw bones which are thought to have aided in tooth development in most other ornithischians. Heterodontosaurids also boasted a unique spheroidal joint between the dentaries and the predentary, allowing the lower jaws to rotate outwards as the mouth was closed, grinding the cheek teeth against each other. Because of the slow replacement rate, this grinding produced extreme tooth wear that commonly obliterated most of the denticles in older teeth, although the increased height of the crowns gave each tooth a long life.

=== Skeleton ===
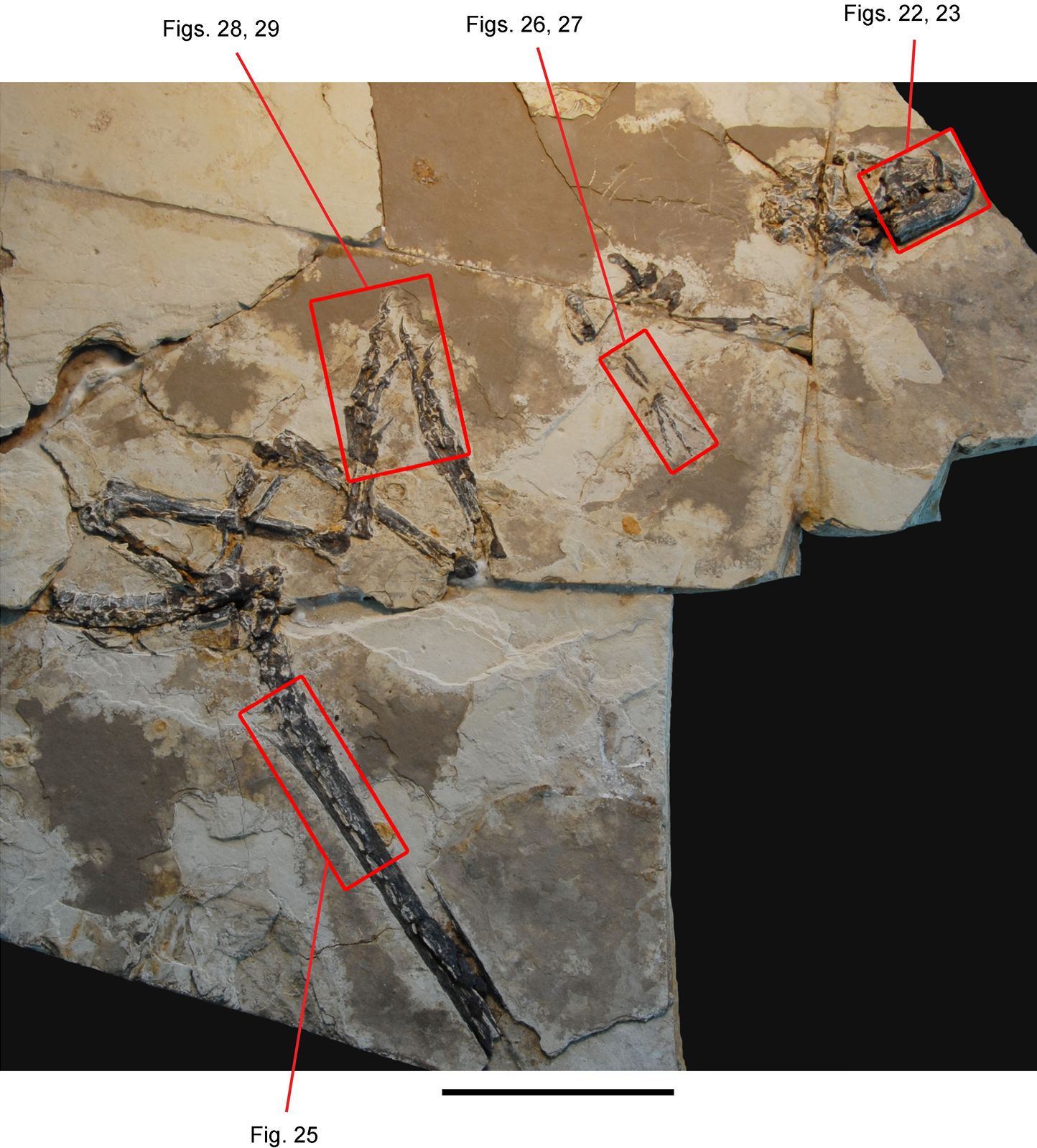
Fossil of Tianyulong, muzzle, hand, feet and tail framed in red

The postcranial anatomy of Heterodontosaurus tucki has been well-described, although H. tucki is generally considered the most derived of the Early Jurassic heterodontosaurids, so it is impossible to know how many of its features were shared with other species. The forelimbs were long for a dinosaur, over 70% of the length of the hindlimbs. The well-developed deltopectoral crest (a ridge for the attachment of chest and shoulder muscles) of the humerus and prominent olecranon process (where muscles that extend the forearm were attached) of the ulna indicate that the forelimb was powerful as well. There were five digits on the manus ('hand'). The first was large, tipped with a sharply curved claw, and would rotate inwards when flexed; Robert Bakker called it the 'twist-thumb'. The second digit was the longest, slightly longer than the third. Both of these digits bore claws, while the clawless fourth and fifth digits were very small and simple in comparison. In the hindlimb, the tibia was 30% longer than the femur, which is generally considered an adaptation for speed. The tibia and fibula of the lower leg were fused to the astragalus and calcaneum of the ankle, forming a 'tibiofibiotarsus' convergently with modern birds. Also similarly to birds, the lower tarsal (ankle) bones and metatarsals were fused to form a 'tarsometatarsus.' There are four digits in the pes (hindfoot), with only the second, third, and fourth contacting the ground. The tail, unlike many other ornithischians, did not have ossified tendons to maintain a rigid posture and was probably flexible. The fragmentary skeleton known for Abrictosaurus has never been fully described, although the forelimb and manus were smaller than in Heterodontosaurus. Also, the fourth and fifth digits of the forelimb each bear one fewer phalanx bone.

== Classification ==
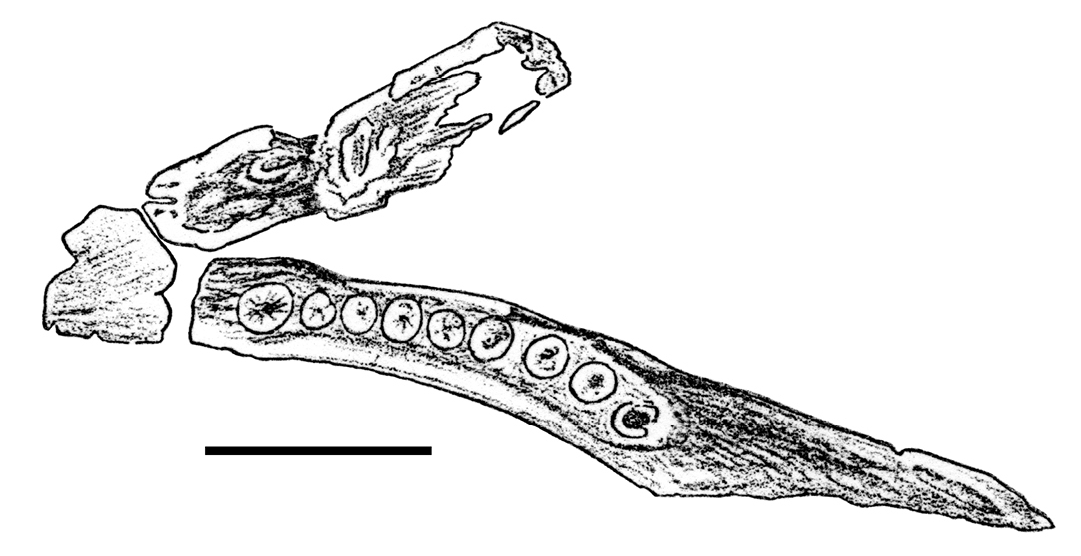
Holotype jawbone of Geranosaurus

South African paleontologist Robert Broom created the name Geranosaurus in 1911 for dinosaur jaw bones missing all of the teeth and some partial associated limb bones. In 1924, Lycorhinus was named, and classified as a cynodont, by Sidney Haughton. Heterodontosaurus was named in 1962 and it, Lycorhinus and Geranosaurus were recognized as closely related ornithischian dinosaurs. Alfred Romer named Heterodontosauridae in 1966 as a family of ornithischian dinosaurs including Heterodontosaurus and Lycorhinus. Kuhn independently proposed Heterodontosauridae in the same year and is sometimes cited as its principal author. It was defined as a clade in 1998 by Paul Sereno and redefined by him in 2005 as the stem clade consisting of Heterodontosaurus tucki and all species more closely related to Heterodontosaurus than to Parasaurolophus walkeri, Pachycephalosaurus wyomingensis, Triceratops horridus, or Ankylosaurus magniventris. Heterodontosauridae was given a formal definition in the PhyloCode by Daniel Madzia and colleagues in 2021 as "the largest clade containing Heterodontosaurus tucki, but not Iguanodon bernissartensis, Pachycephalosaurus wyomingensis, Stegosaurus stenops, and Triceratops horridus". Heterodontosaurinae is a stem-based taxon defined phylogenetically for the first time by Paul Sereno in 2012 as "the most inclusive clade containing Heterodontosaurus tucki but not Tianyulong confuciusi, Fruitadens haagarorum, Echinodon becklesii."

Heterodontosauridae includes the genera Abrictosaurus, Lycorhinus, and Heterodontosaurus, all from South Africa. While Richard Thulborn once reassigned all three to Lycorhinus, all other authors consider the three genera distinct. Within the family, Heterodontosaurus and Lycorhinus are considered sister taxa, with Abrictosaurus as a basal member. Geranosaurus is also a heterodontosaurid, but is usually considered a nomen dubium because the type specimen is missing all its teeth, making it indistinguishable from any other genus in the family. More recently, the genus Echinodon has been considered a heterodontosaurid in several studies. Lanasaurus was named for an upper jaw in 1975, but more recent discoveries have shown that it belongs to Lycorhinus instead, making Lanasaurus a junior synonym of that genus. Dianchungosaurus was once considered a heterodontosaurid from Asia, but it has since been shown that the remains were a chimera of prosauropod and mesoeucrocodylian remains. José Bonaparte also classified the South American Pisanosaurus as a heterodontosaurid at one time, but this animal is now known to be a more basal ornithischian.

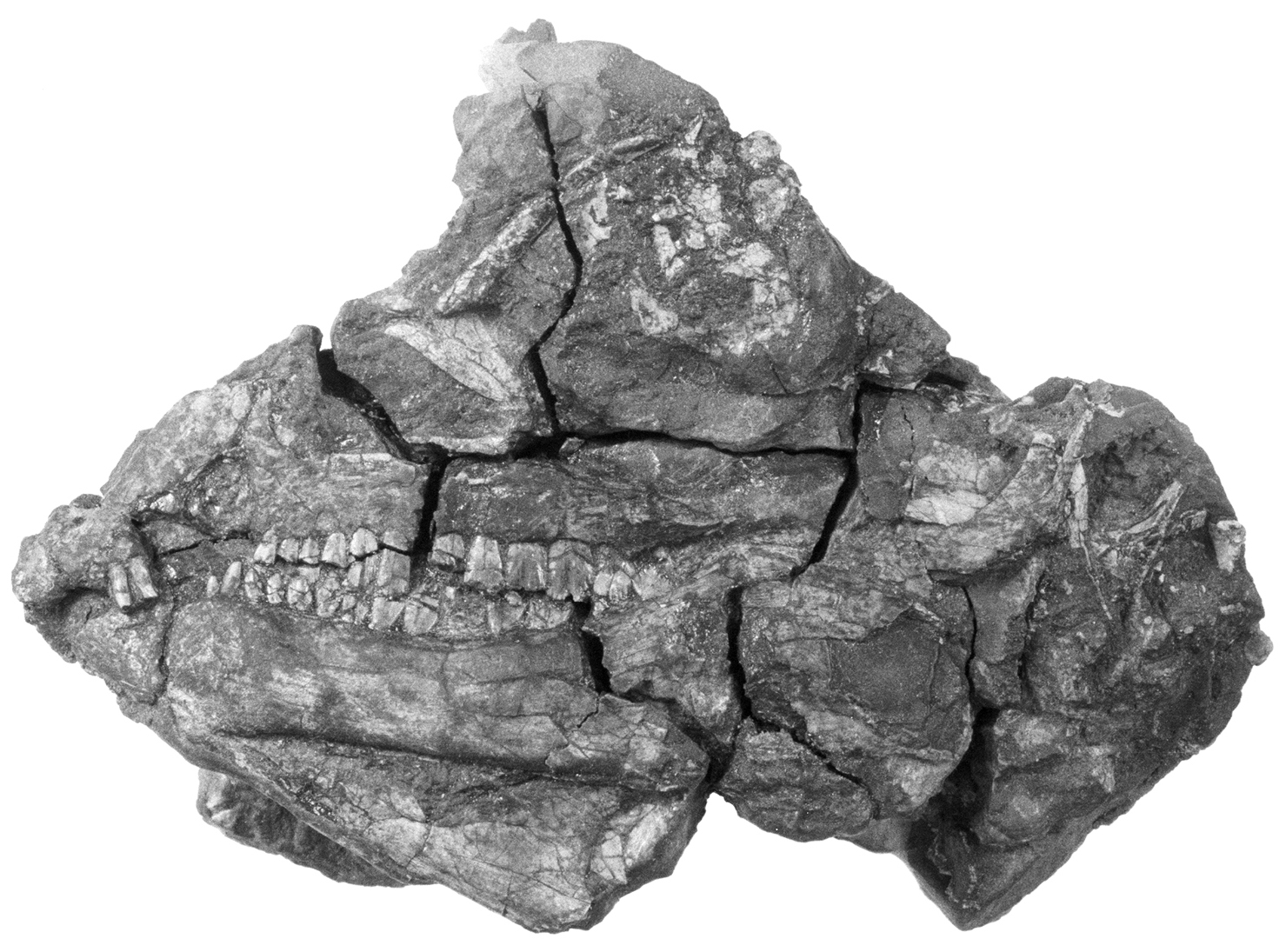
Skull of Abrictosaurus

The membership of Heterodontosauridae is well-established in comparison to its uncertain phylogenetic position. Several early studies suggested that heterodontosaurids were very primitive ornithischians. Due to supposed similarities in the morphology of the forelimbs, Robert Bakker proposed a relationship between heterodontosaurids and early sauropodomorphs like Anchisaurus, bridging the orders Saurischia and Ornithischia. The dominant hypothesis over the last several decades has placed heterodontosaurids as basal ornithopods. However, others have suggested that heterodontosaurids instead share a common ancestor with Marginocephalia (ceratopsians and pachycephalosaurs), a hypothesis that has found support in some early 21st century studies. The clade containing heterodontosaurids and marginocephalians has been named Heterodontosauriformes. Heterodontosaurids have also been seen as basal to both ornithopods and marginocephalians. In 2007, a cladistic analysis suggested that heterodontosaurids are basal to all known ornithischians except Pisanosaurus, a result that echoes some of the very earliest work on the family. However, a study by Bonaparte found the Pisanosauridae to be synonymous with the Heterodontosauridae and not a separate family in its own right, thereby including Pisanosaurus as a heterodontosaur. Butler et al. (2010) found the Heterodontosauridae to be the most basal known significant ornithischian radiation.

The cladogram below shows the interrelationships within Heterodontosauridae, and follows the analysis by Sereno, 2012:

- Heterodontosauridae
  - - Echinodon
    - Fruitadens
    - Tianyulong
  - Heterodontosaurinae
    - Lycorhinus
    - - - Pegomastax
        - Manidens
      - - Abrictosaurus
        - Heterodontosaurus

A 2020 reworking of Cerapoda by Dieudonné and colleagues recovered the animals traditionally considered 'heterodontosaurids' as a basal grouping within Pachycephalosauria, paraphyletic with respect to the traditional, dome-headed pachycephalosaurs. This result was based on numerous skull characteristics including the dentition, and also to account for the fact that pachycephalosaur fossils are completely unknown from the Jurassic period. Modern understanding of ornithischian phylogeny implies that Jurassic pachycephalosaurs must exist, because numerous Jurassic ceratopsians have been found, yet no such pachycephalosaurs have been confidently identified. This analysis was done to elaborate on the findings of Baron and colleagues (2017), which found Chilesaurus to be a basal ornithischian. The phylogenetic analysis was conducted with Chilesaurus coded as an ornithischian, which also had implications for the phylogeny of ornithopods. Similar results were also found by Dieudonné et al. (2026).

The cladogram below is an abridged version of Dieudonne and colleagues' findings:

- Ornithischia
  - Chilesaurus
  - - Laquintasaura
    - - Lesothosaurus
      - "Heterodontosauridae" (conventional position)
      - Genasauria
        - Thyreophora
        - - - Eocursor
            - - - Agilisaurus
                - Hexinlusaurus
              - - Ornithopoda
                - Marginocephalia
                  - Ceratopsia
                  - Pachycephalosauria
                    - - Fruitadens
                      - - Lycorhinus
                        - - Heterodontosaurus
                          - Abrictosaurus
                    - - Tianyulong
                      - - Echinodon
                        - - Wannanosaurus
                          - - Goyocephale
                            - - Prenocephale
                              - Homalocephale
                              - Stegoceras
                              - Pachycephalosaurus

== Distribution ==
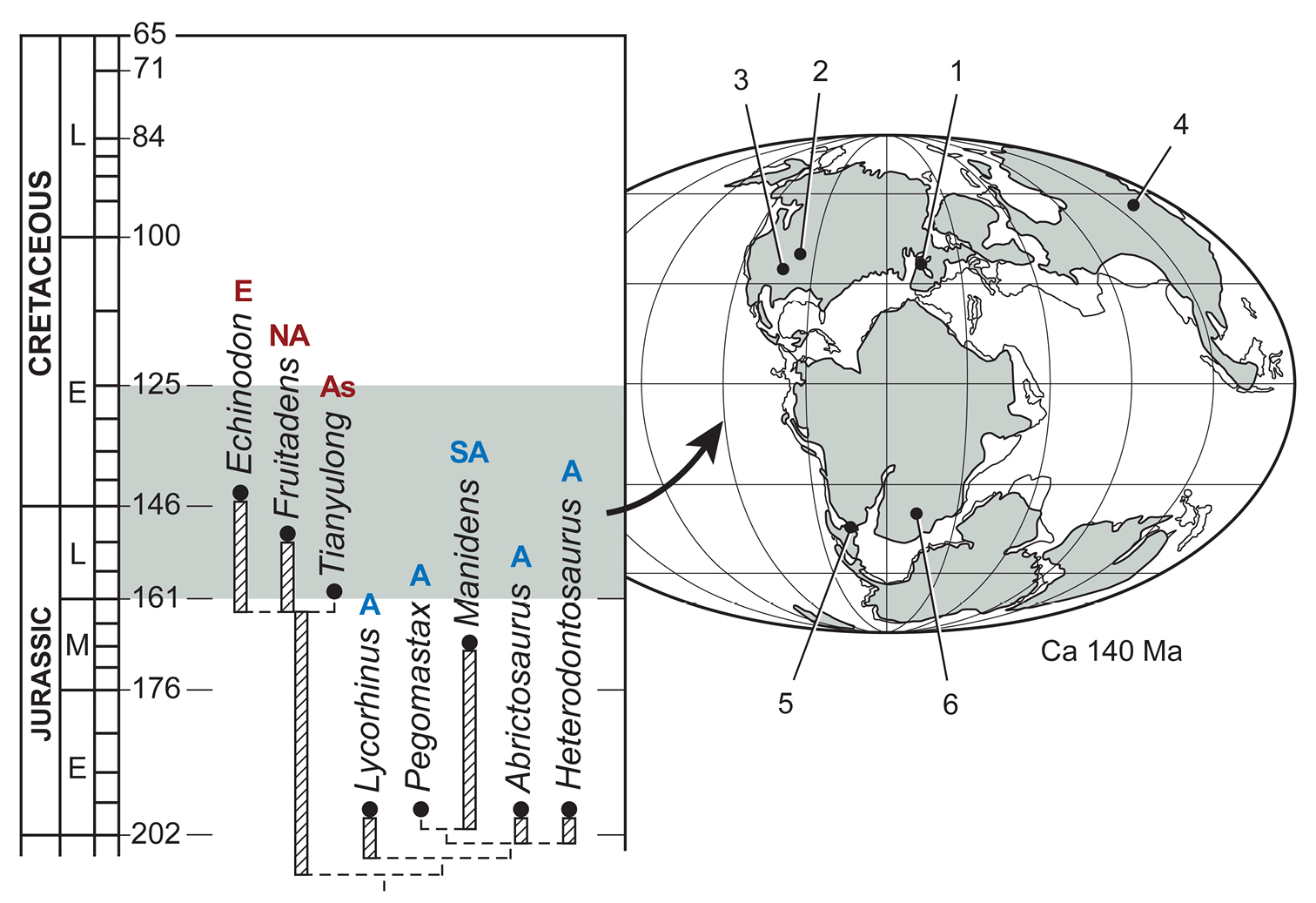
Biogeographic distribution of heterodontosaurids in time

While originally known only from the Early Jurassic of southern Africa, heterodontosaurid remains are now known from four continents. Early in heterodontosaurid history, the supercontinent Pangaea was still largely intact, allowing the family to achieve a near-worldwide distribution. The oldest known possible heterodontosaurid remains are a jaw fragment and isolated teeth from the Laguna Colorada Formation of Argentina, which dates back to the Late Triassic. These remains have a derived morphology similar to Heterodontosaurus, including a caniniform with serrations on both anterior and posterior edges, as well as high-crowned maxillary teeth lacking a cingulum. Irmis et al. (2007) tentatively agreed that this fossil material represents a heterodontosaurid, but stated that additional material is needed to confirm this assignment because the specimen is poorly preserved, while Sereno (2012) only stated that this material may represent an ornithischian or even specifically a heterodontosaurid. Olsen, Kent & Whiteside (2010) noted that the age of the Laguna Colorada Formation itself is poorly constrained, and thus it wasn't conclusively determined whether the putative heterodontosaurid from this formation is of Triassic or Jurassic age. The most diverse heterodontosaurid fauna comes from the Early Jurassic of southern Africa, where fossils of Heterodontosaurus, Abrictosaurus, Lycorhinus, and the dubious Geranosaurus are found.

Undescribed Early Jurassic heterodontosaurids are also known from the United States and Mexico, respectively. In addition, beginning in the 1970s, a great deal of fossil material was discovered from the Late Jurassic Morrison Formation near Fruita, Colorado in the United States. Described in print in 2009, this material was placed in the genus Fruitadens. Indeterminate heterodontosaurid teeth have been reported from the Middle Jurassic (Bathonian) Great Oolite Group of Great Britain, as well as the equivalently aged Itat Formation of Western Siberia. Heterodontosaurid teeth lacking a cingulum have also been described from Late Jurassic and Early Cretaceous formations in Spain and Portugal. The remains of Echinodon were redescribed in 2002, showing that it may represent a late-surviving heterodontosaurid from the Berriasian stage of the Early Cretaceous in southern England. Dianchungosaurus from the Early Jurassic of China is no longer considered a heterodontosaurid; though one Middle-Late Jurassic Asian form is known (Tianyulong). Indeterminate cheek teeth possibly representing heterodontosaurids are also known from the Barremian aged Wessex Formation of southern England, which if confirmed would represent the youngest record of the group.

== Paleobiology ==
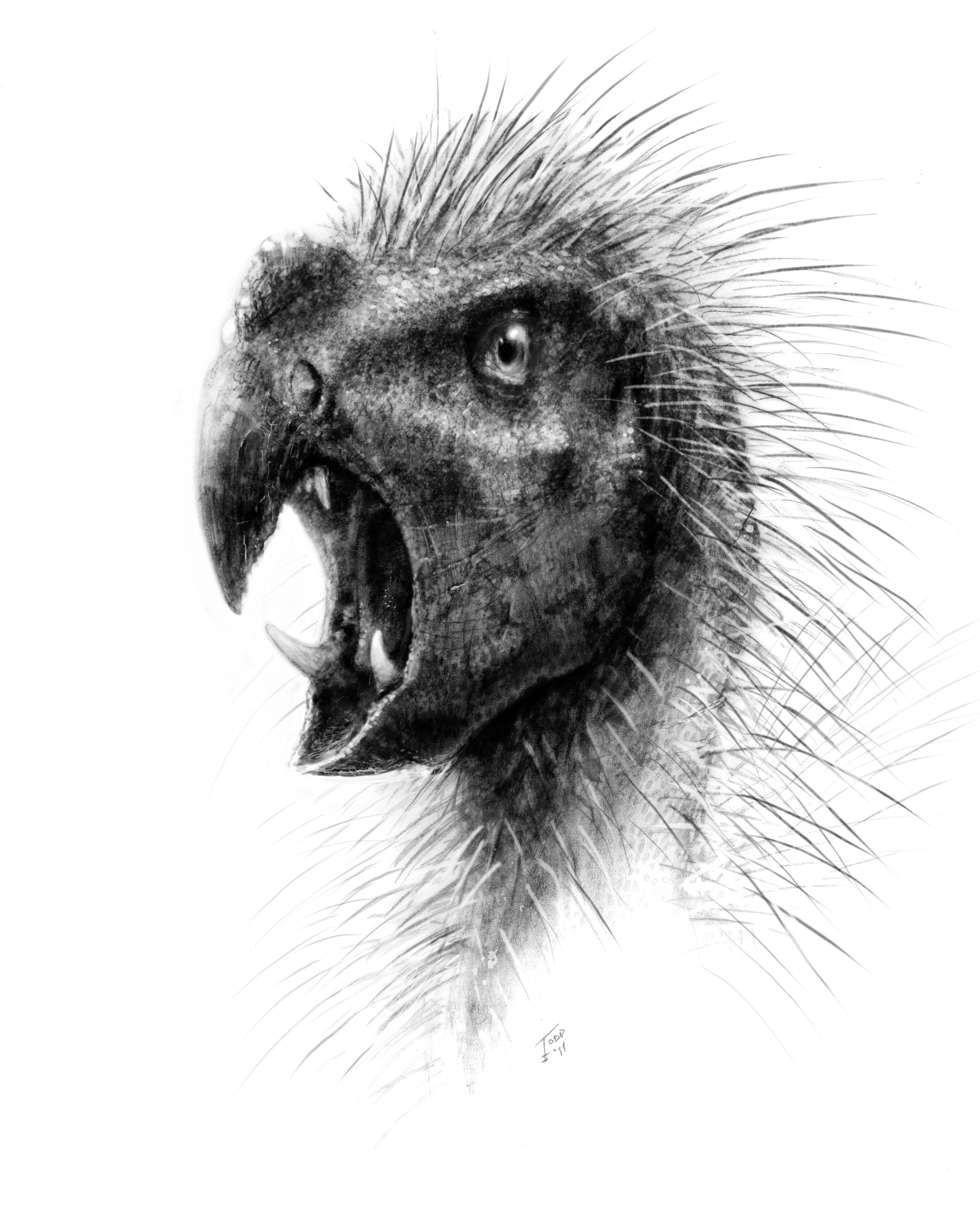
Restoration of Pegomastax

Most heterodontosaurid fossils are found in geologic formations that represent arid to semi-arid environments, including the Upper Elliot Formation of South Africa and the Purbeck Beds of southern England. It has been suggested that heterodontosaurids underwent seasonal aestivation or hibernation during the driest times of year. Due to the lack of replacement teeth in most heterodontosaurids, it was proposed that the entire set of teeth was replaced during this dormant period, as it seemed that continual and sporadic replacement of teeth would interrupt the function of the tooth row as a single chewing surface. However, this was based on a misunderstanding of heterodontosaurid jaw mechanics. It was thought that heterodontosaurids actually did replace their teeth continually, though more slowly than in other reptiles, but CT scanning of skulls from juvenile and mature Heterodontosaurus shows no replacement teeth. There is currently no evidence that supports the hypothesis of aestivation in heterodontosaurids, but it cannot be rejected, based on the skull scans.

While the cheek teeth of heterodontosaurids are clearly adapted for grinding tough plant material, their diet may have been omnivorous. The pointed premaxillary teeth and sharp, curved claws on the forelimbs suggest some degree of predatory behavior. It has been suggested that the long, powerful forelimbs of Heterodontosaurus may have been useful for tearing into insect nests, similarly to modern anteaters. These forelimbs may have also functioned as digging tools, perhaps for roots and tubers.

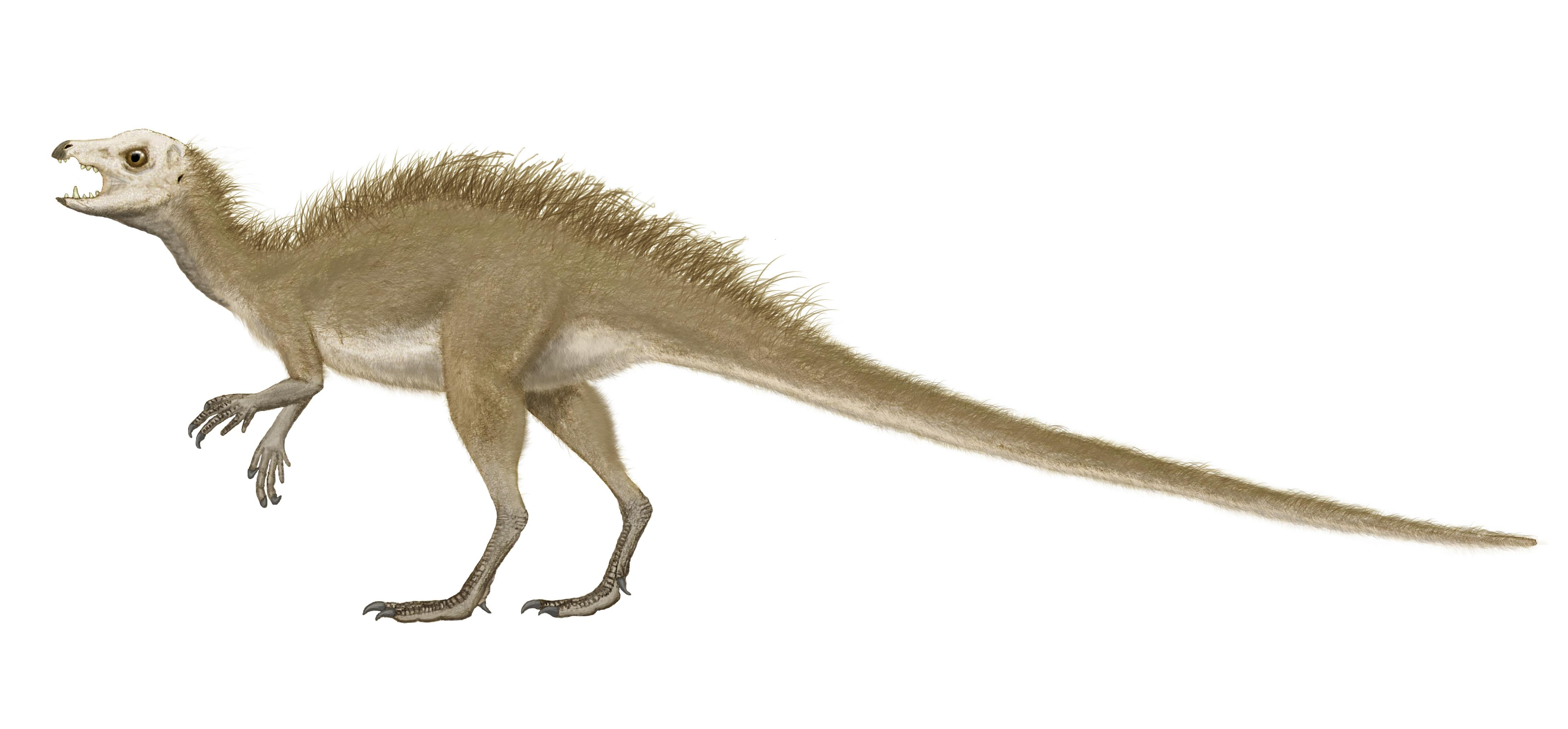
Life restoration of Fruitadens

The length of the forelimb compared to the hindlimb suggests that Heterodontosaurus might have been partially quadrupedal, and the prominent olecranon process and hyperextendable digits of the forelimb are found in many quadrupeds. However, the manus is clearly designed for grasping, not weight support. Many features of the hindlimb, including the long tibia and foot, as well as the fusion of the tibiofibiotarsus and tarsometatarsus, indicate that heterodontosaurids were adapted to run quickly on the hindlegs, so it is unlikely that Heterodontosaurus moved on all four limbs except perhaps when feeding.

The short tusks found in all known heterodontosaurids strongly resemble tusks found in modern musk deer, peccaries and pigs. In many of these animals (as well as the longer-tusked walrus and Asian elephants), this is a sexually dimorphic trait, with tusks only found in males. The type specimen of Abrictosaurus lacks tusks and was originally described as a female. While this remains possible, the unfused sacral vertebrae and short face indicate that this specimen represents a juvenile animal. A second, larger specimen originally proposed to belong to Abrictosaurus clearly possesses tusks, which was used to support the idea that tusks are found only in adults, rather than being a secondary sexual characteristic of males. These tusks could have been used for combat or display with members of the same species or with other species. The absence of tusks in juvenile Abrictosaurus could also be another characteristic separating it from other heterodontosaurids as well, as tusks are known in juvenile Heterodontosaurus. Other proposed functions for the tusks include defense and use in an occasionally omnivorous diet. However, this specimen was alternatively reassigned to Lycorhinus by Sereno in 2012, which is already known to have possessed tusks and therefore their absence in Abrictosaurus may not have been a result of age.

In 2005 a small complete fossilized heterodontosaurid skeleton more than 200 million years old was discovered in South Africa. In July 2016 it was scanned by a team of South African researchers using the European Synchrotron Radiation Facility; the scan of the dentition revealed palate bones less than a millimeter thick.
