= Tianyulong =

Tianyulong Temporal range: Late Jurassic, 158.5 Ma
- Fossil specimen, Chaoyang Paleontological Museum

Scientific classification
- Kingdom: Animalia
- Phylum: Chordata
- Class: Reptilia
- Clade: Dinosauria
- Clade: †Ornithischia
- Family: †Heterodontosauridae
- Genus: †Tianyulong; Zheng et al., 2009
- Species: †T. confuciusi

Binomial name
- †Tianyulong confuciusi Zheng et al., 2009

Extinct genus of dinosaurs

Tianyulong (Chinese: 天宇龍; Pinyin: tiānyǔlóng; named for the Shandong Tianyu Museum of Nature where the holotype fossil is housed) is an extinct genus of heterodontosaurid ornithischian dinosaur. The only species is T. confuciusi, whose remains were discovered in Jianchang County, Western Liaoning Province, China.

== History of discovery ==
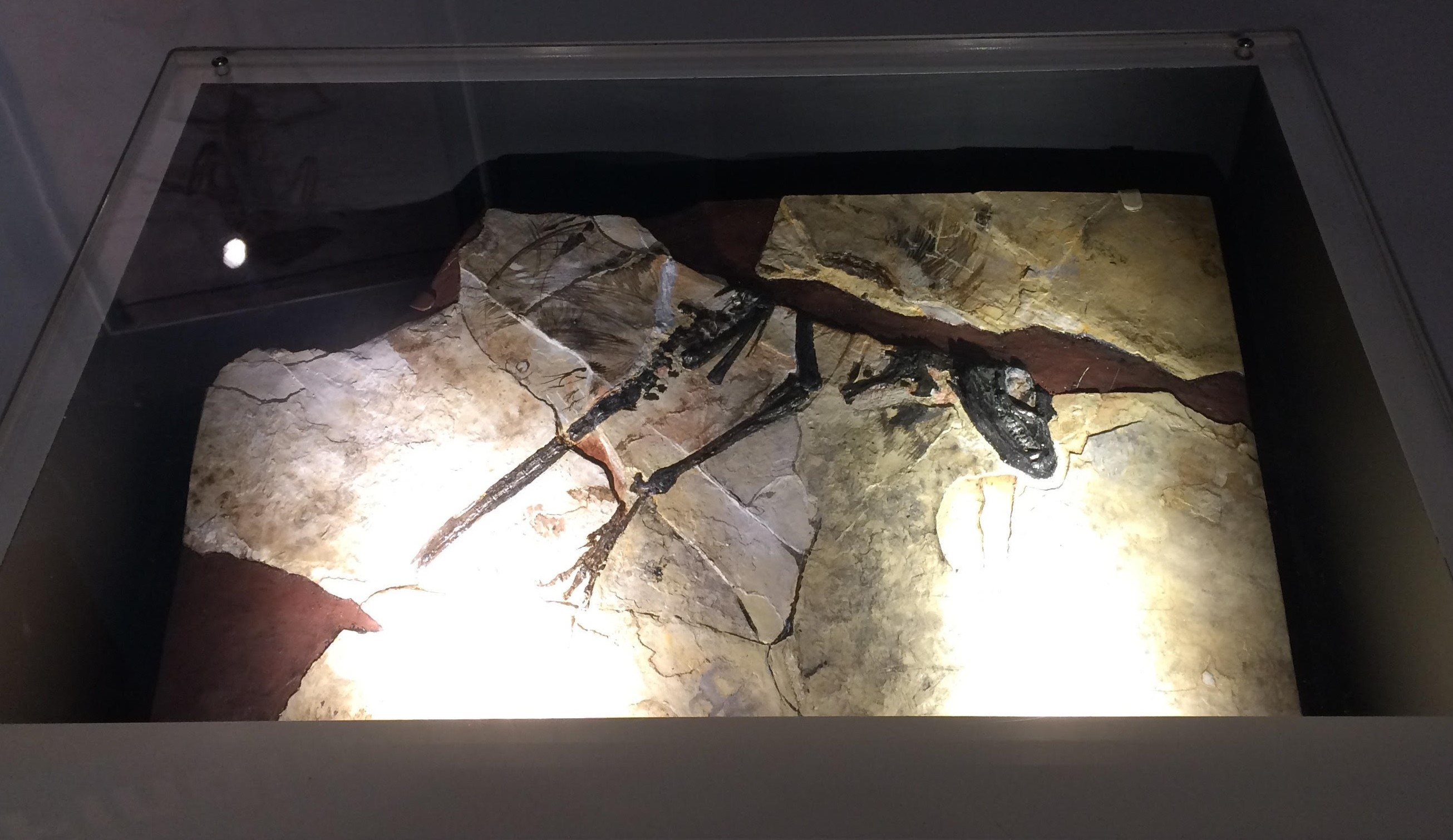
The holotype skeleton STMN 26-3

Tianyulong confuciusi was first named and described in 2006 by Xiao-Ting Zheng and colleagues for a single fossil consisting of most of the skull and skeleton; the holotype Shandong Tianyu Museum of Nature specimen 26-3. Despite being privately collected with uncertain stratigraphic and geographic origins, Tianyulong was placed as coming from the Early Cretaceous Jehol Group which can be found throughout Liaoning Province where the specimen was discovered, as one of the youngest and only Asian members of the ornithischian group Heterodontosauridae. The genus name is derived from the name of STMN that houses the specimen, while the species name is in honour of Confucius, the founder of Confucianism. The specimen, prepared by Y.-Q. Zhang at the STMN, was most notable as the first identified presence of "protofeathers" in an ornithischian dinosaur, showing similarities to both structures preserved on the tail of Psittacosaurus as well as across the body of Sinosauropteryx, but nearly the entire skeleton was also present and articulated only missing the rear portion of the skull, the middle to end of the tail, and parts of the forelimb and hindlimb.

Five additional specimens of Tianyulong are known that are all similarly privately collected and thus of uncertain provenance; four in the STMN that are undescribed and a fifth in the Institute of Vertebrate Paleontology and Paleoanthropology that was described in 2012 by Paul Sereno. The latter specimen, IVPP V17090, similarly includes a nearly complete but partially unprepared skull, a continuous segment of vertebrae from the back through to the tail, parts of the forelimbs, and both complete hindlimbs. Evaluation of the locality where Tianyulong was found, Yaolugou, questioned the Early Cretaceous age and equivalence to the Jehol Group originally suggested. A sample from volcanic rocks overlying the Tianyulong horizon was dated through Uranium-lead dating to an age of 158.5 million years old, placing Tianyulong as at least as old and from the Middle Jurassic rather than later. This re-evaluated age would place Tianyulong, and coexisting Anchiornis and Darwinopterus, as members of the Daohugou Biota and correlated with the Tiaojishan Formation (also called the Lanqi Formation outside Hebei Province).

== Description ==
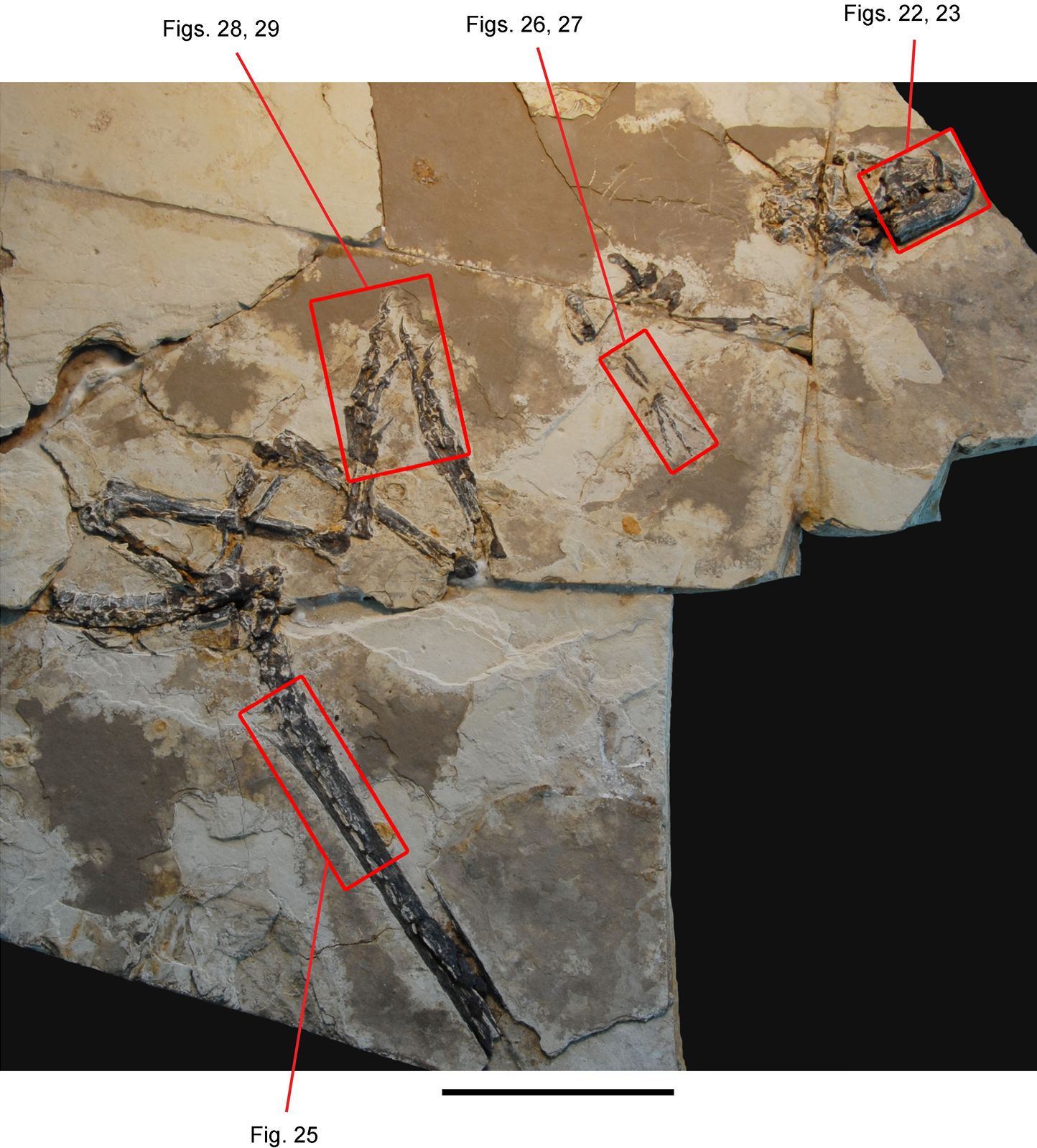
Specimen IVPP V17090, muzzle, hand, feet and tail framed in red

Though known specimens are not complete, based on Heterodontosaurus it is estimated that Tianyulong reached around 70 centimetres (2.3 ft) in length, of which around 44 centimetres (1.44 ft) would have consisted of the tail. The 2009 description interpreted the holotype as a subadult, whereas Sereno's 2012 study interpreted it as an adult. The proportions of Tianyulong are highly distinct from Heterodontosaurus and, seemingly, other heterodontosaurids (who are known from more fragmentary remains). Its skull was especially large compared to the small neck and body. The hindlimbs were extremely long, with the tibia much longer than the femur, whereas the forelimbs were very short, less than 30% the length of the hindlimbs.

Tianyulong has a row of long, filamentous integumentary structures on the back, tail and neck of the specimen. The similarity of these structures with those found on some theropods suggests their homology with feathers and raises the possibility that the earliest dinosaurs and their ancestors were covered with homologous dermal filamentous structures that can be considered primitive feathers ("proto-feathers").

== Classification ==
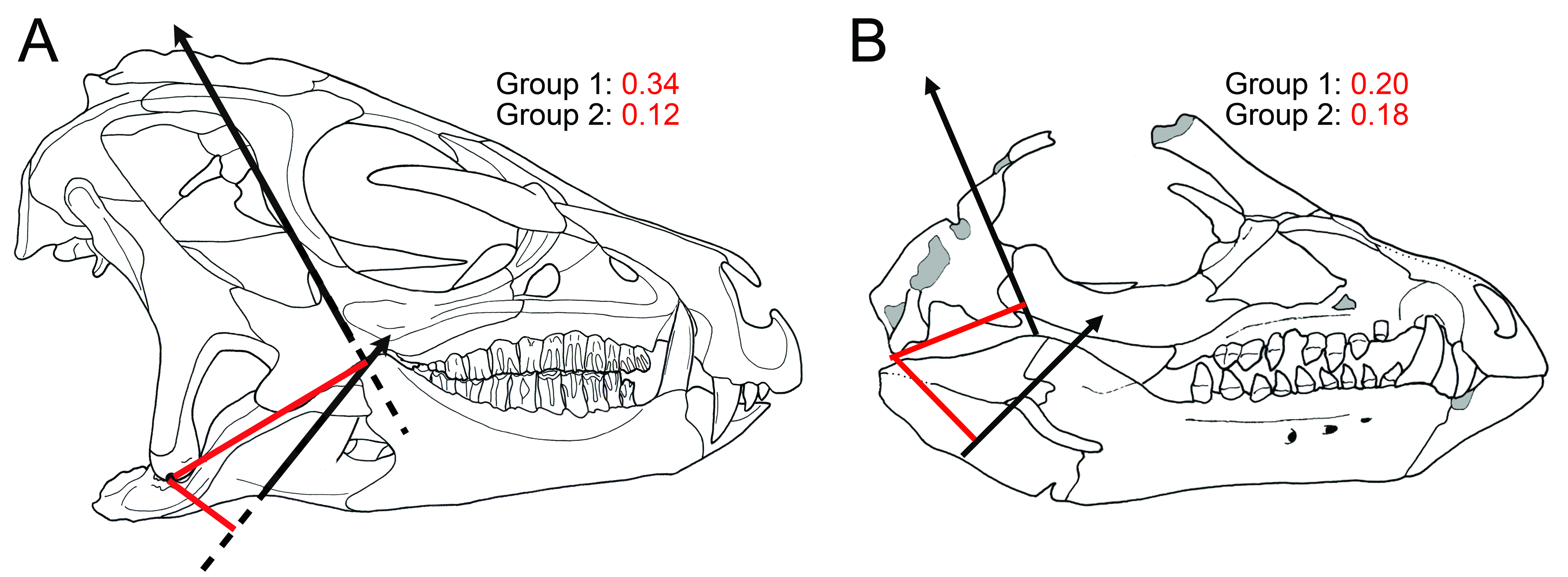
Skull diagrams of Heterodontosaurus and Tianyulong

Tianyulong is classified as a heterodontosaurid, a group of small ornithischian dinosaur characterized by a slender body, long tail and a pair of enlarged canine-like tusks. They were herbivorous or possibly omnivorous. Until the discovery of Tianyulong, known members of the group were restricted to the Early Jurassic of South Africa, with one genus (Fruitadens) from the Late Jurassic of the US, and possibly one additional genus (Echinodon) from the Early Cretaceous of England.

The cladogram below follows the analysis by Butler et al., 2011:

- Heterodontosauridae
  - Echinodon
  - Abrictosaurus
  - - - NHM RU A100
      - Heterodontosaurus
      - Lycorhinus
    - - Fruitadens
      - Tianyulong

== Paleobiology ==
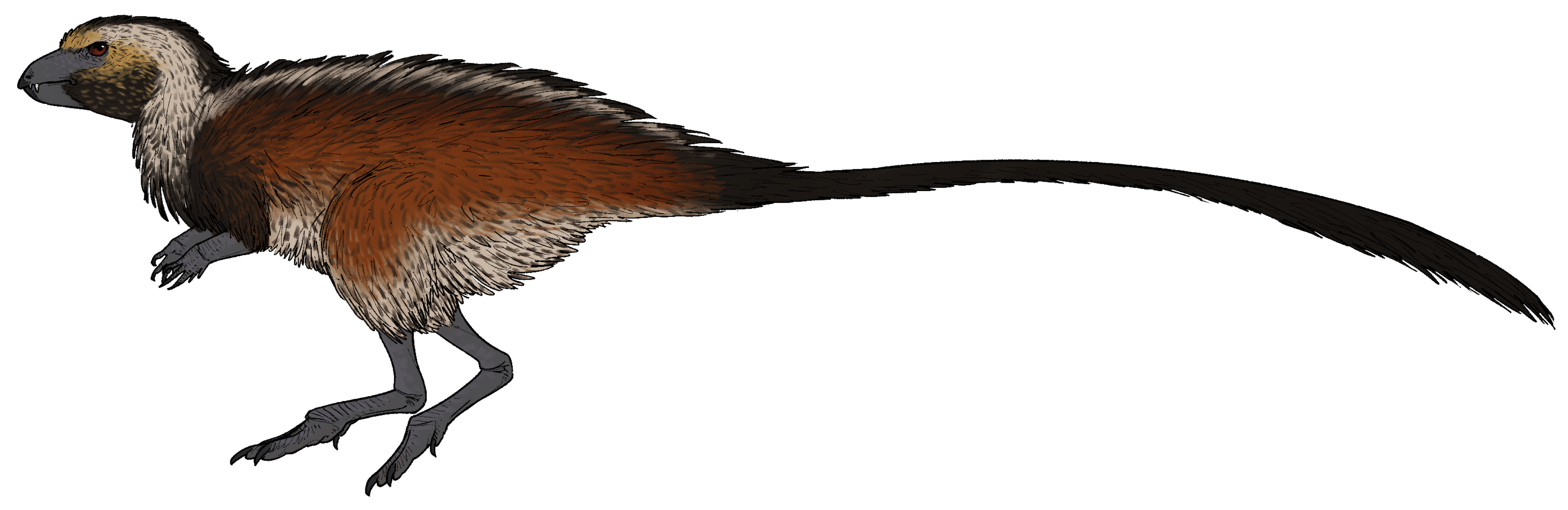
Restoration

The filamentous integumentary structures are preserved on three areas of the fossil: in one patch just below the neck, another one on the back, and the largest one above the tail. The hollow filaments are parallel to each other and are singular with no evidence of branching. They also appear to be relatively rigid, making them more analogous to the integumentary structures found on the tail of Psittacosaurus than to the proto-feather structures found in avian and non-avian theropods. Among the theropods, the structures in Tianyulong are most similar to the singular unbranched proto-feathers of Sinosauropteryx and Beipiaosaurus. The estimated length of the integumentary structures on the tail is about 60 mm which is seven times the height of a caudal vertebra. Their length and hollow nature argue against of them being subdermal structures such as collagen fibers. Such dermal structures have previously been reported only in derived theropods and ornithischians, and their discovery in Tianyulong extends the existence of such structures further down in the phylogenetic tree. However, the homology between the ornithischian filaments and the theropods' proto-feathers is not obvious. If the homology is supported, the consequence is that the common ancestor of both saurischians and ornithischians were covered by feather-like structures, and that groups for which skin impression are known such as the sauropods were only secondarily featherless. If the homology is not supported, it would indicate that these filamentous dermal structures evolved independently in saurischians and ornithischians, as well as in other archosaurs such as the pterosaurs. The authors (in supplementary information to their primary article) noted that discovery of similar filamentous structures in the theropod Beipiaosaurus bolstered the idea that the structures on Tianyulong are homologous with feathers. Both the filaments of Tianyulong and the filaments of Beipiaosaurus were long, singular, and unbranched. In Beipiaosaurus, however, the filaments were flattened. In Tianyulong, the filaments were round in cross section, and therefore closer in structure to the earliest forms of feathers predicted by developmental models. A study published in the journal Biology Letters rigorously tested the hypothesis that protofeathers are plesiomorphic to dinosaurs. The results supported the hypothesis that scales are plesiomorphic to dinosaurs. While it is true that feather beta keratin is present in crocodilian scales in embryonic development, it fails to support the maximum-likelihood of protofeathers being plesiomorphic.
