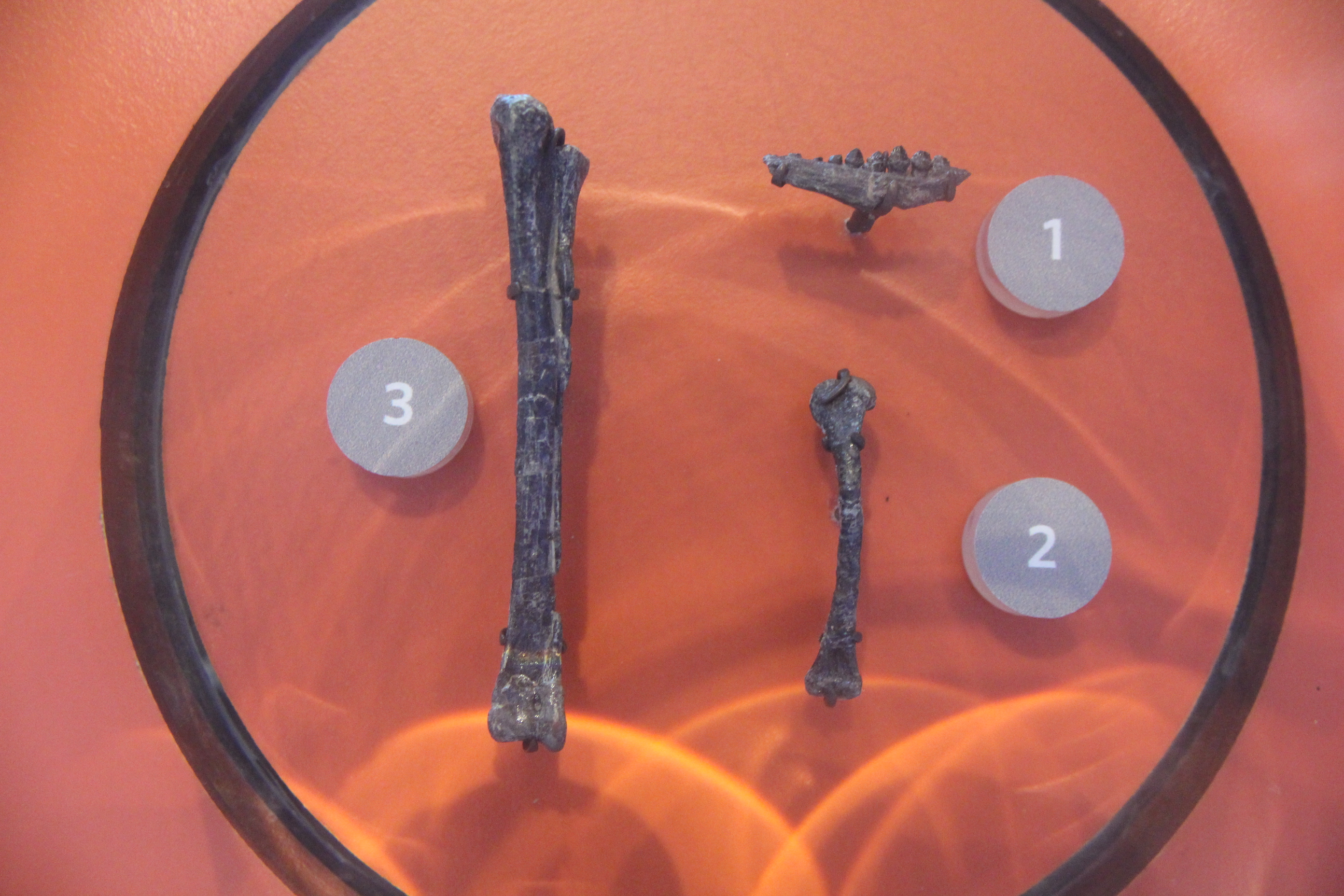
- Lower jaw and limb bones (LACM 128258 and LACM 120478), Natural History Museum of Los Angeles County

Scientific classification
- Kingdom: Animalia
- Phylum: Chordata
- Class: Reptilia
- Clade: Dinosauria
- Clade: †Ornithischia
- Family: †Heterodontosauridae
- Genus: †Fruitadens; Butler et al., 2010
- Species: †F. haagarorum

Binomial name
- †Fruitadens haagarorum Butler et al., 2010

= Fruitadens =

Fruitadens Temporal range: Late Jurassic, 150 Ma

Extinct genus of dinosaurs

Fruitadens is a genus of heterodontosaurid dinosaur. The name means "Fruita teeth", in reference to Fruita, Colorado (USA), where its fossils were first found. It is known from partial skulls and skeletons from at least four individuals of differing biological ages, found in Tithonian (Late Jurassic) rocks of the Morrison Formation in Colorado. Fruitadens is one of the smallest known ornithischian dinosaurs, with young adults estimated at 65 to 75 cm (26 to 30 in) in length and 0.5 to 0.75 kg (1.1 to 1.7 lb) in weight. It is interpreted as an omnivore and represents one of the latest-surviving heterodontosaurids.

== History of discovery ==
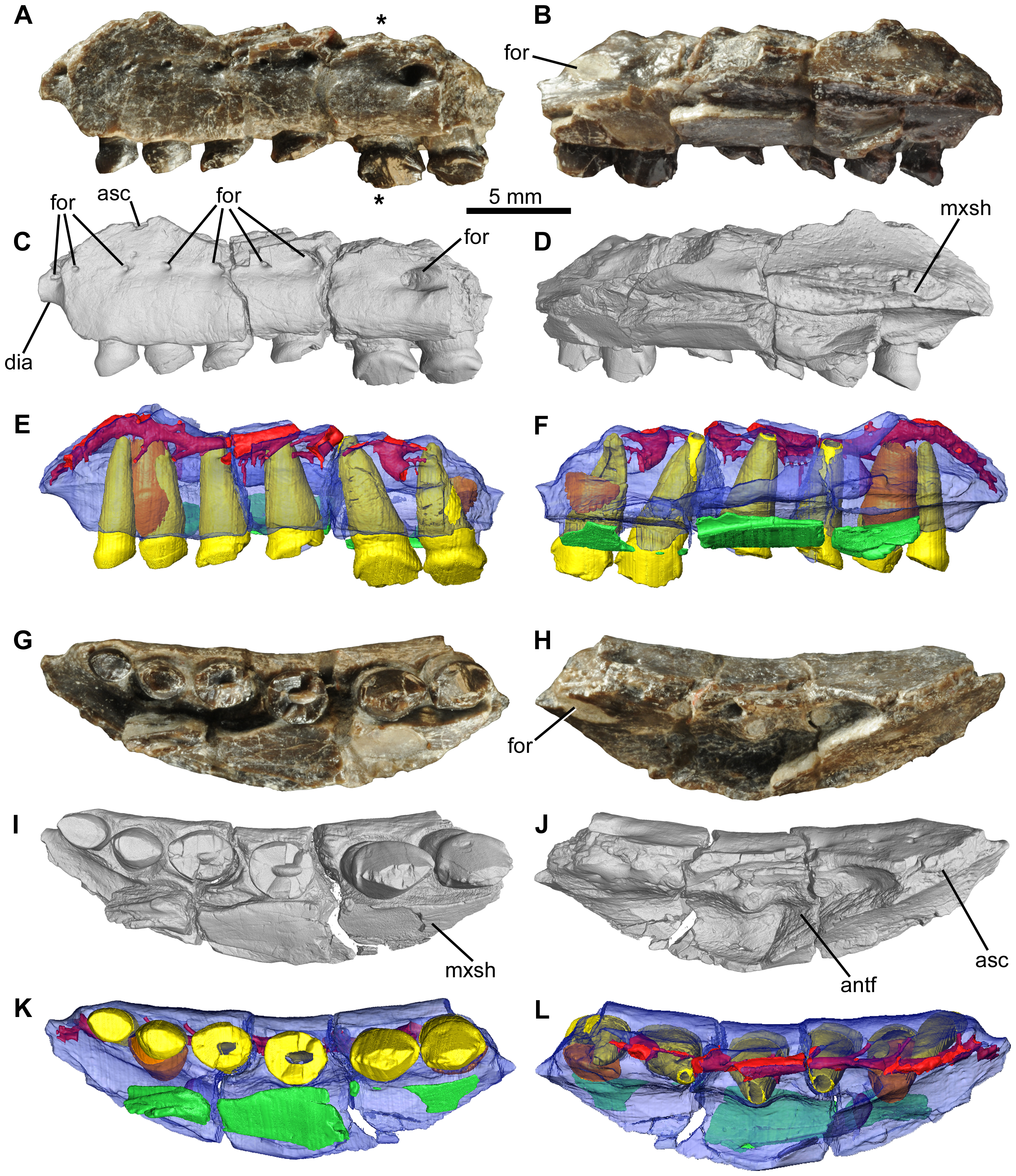
LACM 115747 (holotype), left maxilla

Fruitadens is known from fossils recovered under a valid paleontological permit in the 1970s and 1980s by teams led by George Callison, for the Natural History Museum of Los Angeles County (LACM). The discovery area, on lands managed by the Bureau of Land Management, is known as the Fruita Paleontological Area; the specimens were found there in sandstones of the Brushy Basin Member. Roughly equivalent beds have been dated to 150.3 ± 0.3 million years old and 150.2 ± 0.5 million years old, indicating an early Tithonian age.

The fossils now named Fruitadens were first thought to belong to a fabrosaurid similar to Echinodon, a genus from the Early Cretaceous of England; Fabrosauridae at the time was considered a general group of primitive ornithopods, and Echinodon itself had not yet been reclassified as a heterodontosaurid. Fruitadens, although not formally described for a number of years, was briefly described in several works, usually as a relative of Echinodon or a new species of the genus. Formal description came in January 2010, by Richard Butler and colleagues (though the paper was published online before print in late 2009). The type species is F. haagarorum, in recognition of support provided by Paul Haaga Jr., Heather Haaga, Blythe Haaga, Paul Haaga III, and Catalina Haaga for the Natural History Museum of Los Angeles County.

== Description ==
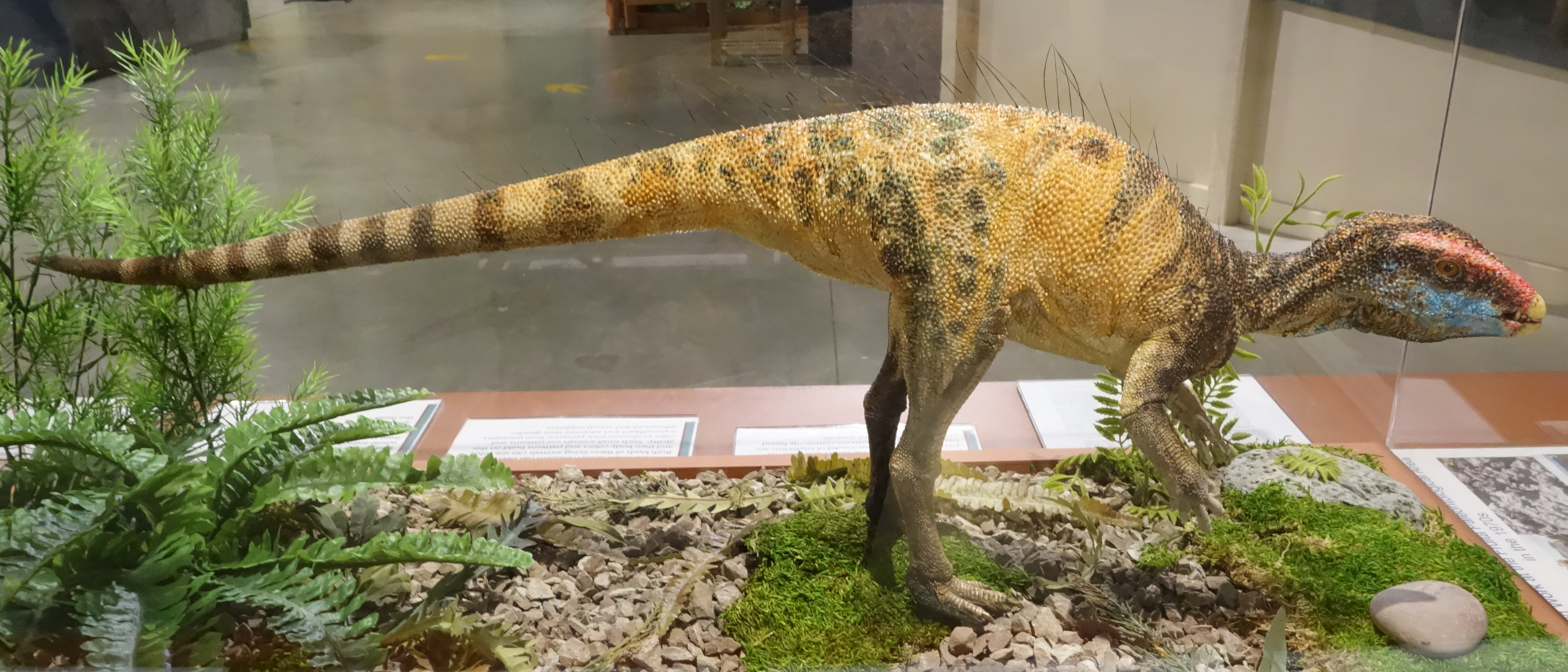
Model reconstruction on display at the Dinosaur Journey Museum

Fruitadens is based on LACM 115747, consisting of incomplete jaws, a number of vertebrae, and partial hind limbs, of a nearly fully grown individual. At least three other individuals have been found. LACM 115727 is another nearly fully grown individual, known from vertebrae and hind limb bones. This individual was about the same size as LACM 115747, and was five years old at death. LACM 120478 consists of the upper arm and most of the left leg of a juvenile, in its second year. Finally, LACM 128258 includes partial jaws and vertebrae of another juvenile. The largest individuals are estimated to have been about 65 to 75 cm (26 to 30 in) long and 0.5 to 0.75 kg (1.1 to 1.7 lb) in weight. This makes Fruitadens the smallest known ornithischian and comparable in size to the smallest known dinosaurs, outside of birds. Known material of Echinodon and Tianyulong, related heterodontosaurids, comes from similar-sized individuals, but it is not known how old they were upon death.

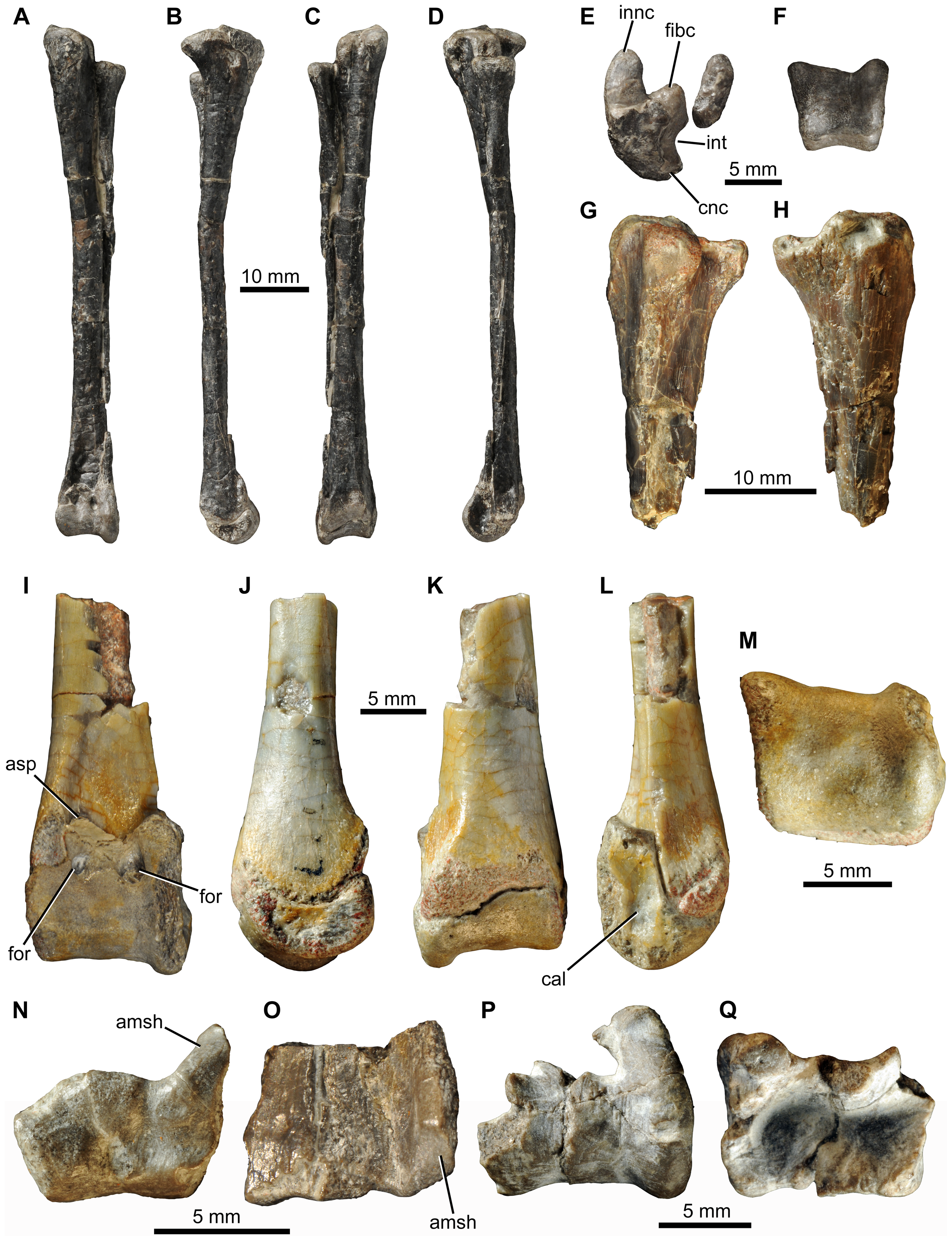
Hind limb bones of several specimens

Fruitadens was similar to Heterodontosaurus in anatomy, with relatively short arms and long distal sections of the legs (feet and shins). The lower jaws had an enlarged canine-like tooth, with a corresponding gap in the upper jaw. Unlike Echinodon, there wasn't an enlarged tooth in the upper jaw. Uniquely, a small peg-like tooth was present in front of the canine-like tooth. Replacement teeth were present in the jaws, unlike most other heterodontosaurids. The hind limb bones were hollow, like those of small theropod dinosaurs. Fruitadens seems to have been more closely related to Heterodontosaurus than Echinodon, which was closer in time.

== Classification ==
The cladogram below follows the analysis by Butler et al., 2011:

- Heterodontosauridae
  - Echinodon
  - Abrictosaurus
  - - - NHM RU A100
      - Heterodontosaurus
      - Lycorhinus
    - - Fruitadens
      - Tianyulong

== Paleoecology and paleobiology ==
Rotating CT scan of the right dentary of the holotype

The four individuals were found in localities at the base of the Morrison Formation's Brushy Basin Member, in crevasse splay sandstones deposited in floodplains. The Fruita localities preserved a contemporaneous fauna including snails, clams, crayfish, various insects (represented by trace fossils), the lungfish Ceratodus, ray–finned fish, the turtle Glyptops, rhynchocephalian reptiles Eilenodon and Opisthias, several genera of lizards, a mesosuchian crocodylomorph, and the mammals Fruitafossor, Glirodon, and Priacodon. Disarticulated dinosaur fossils are common in the area.

Fruitadens was probably bipedal and cursorial, and is suggested to have been omnivorous. Like Echinodon and Tianyulong, other late-surviving heterodontosaurids, Fruitadens had less specialized jaws than Early Jurassic heterodontosaurids like Heterodontosaurus, and is interpreted as a generalist. A 2012 study of the skull suggested its diet was composed of select plant material and possibly insects or other invertebrates.

== See also ==
- 2010 in paleontology
- Dinosaurs of the Morrison Formation
