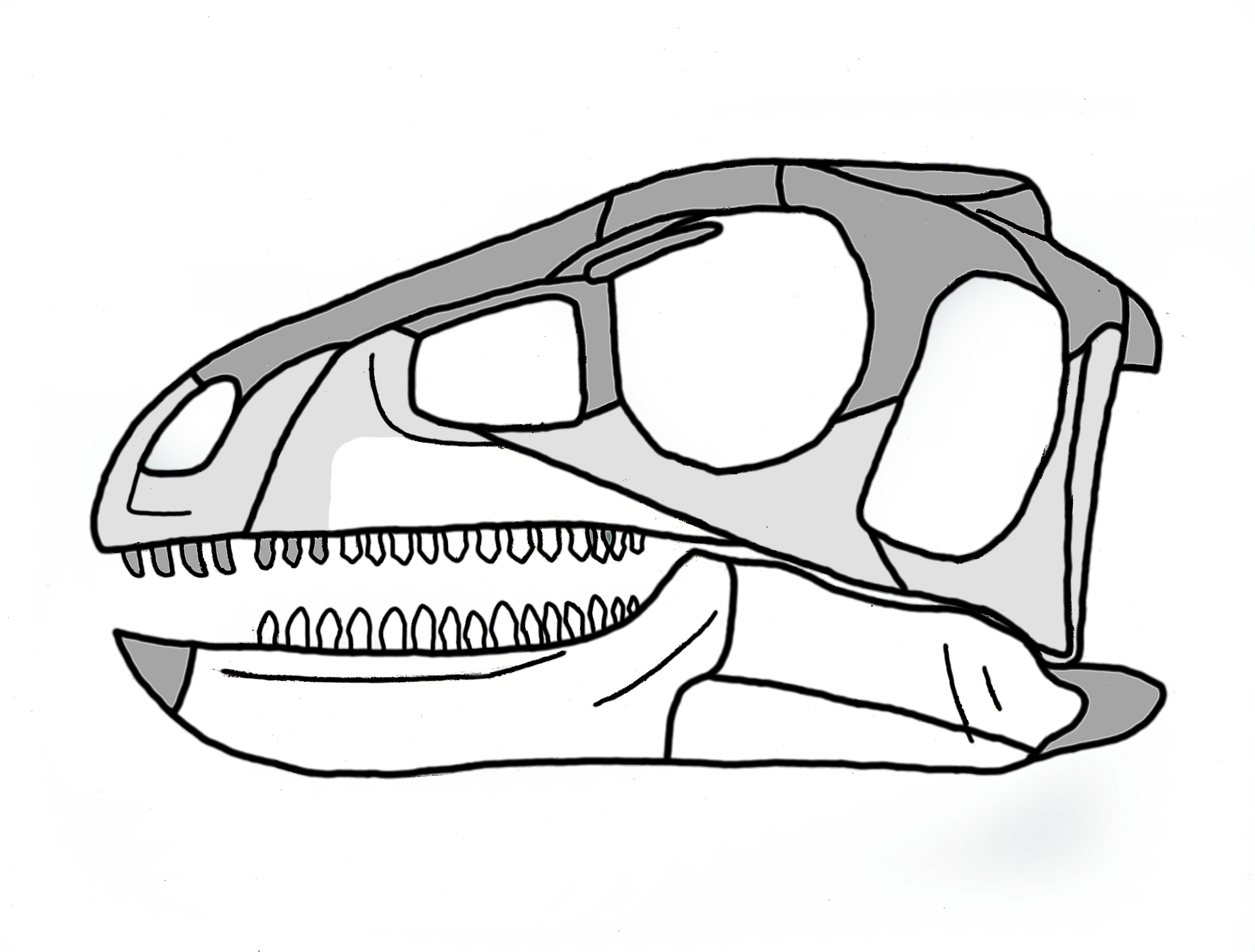
- Reconstruction of the skull, white bones are known, light grey bones were known from heavily eroded impressions

Scientific classification
- Kingdom: Animalia
- Phylum: Chordata
- Class: Reptilia
- Clade: Dinosauria
- Clade: †Ornithischia (?)
- Genus: †Pisanosaurus; Casamiquela, 1967
- Species: †P. mertii

Binomial name
- †Pisanosaurus mertii Casamiquela, 1967

= Pisanosaurus =

Pisanosaurus Temporal range: Late Triassic ~229 Ma

Extinct genus of dinosauriforms

Pisanosaurus (/pɪˌsænəˈsɔːrəs/ piss-AN-ə-SOR-əs) is an extinct genus of early dinosauriform, likely an ornithischian or silesaurid, from the Late Triassic of Argentina. It was a small, lightly built, ground-dwelling herbivore, that could grow up to an estimated 1 m (3.3 ft) long. Only one species, the type, Pisanosaurus mertii, is known, based on a single partial skeleton discovered in the Ischigualasto Formation of the Ischigualasto-Villa Unión Basin in northwestern Argentina. This part of the formation has been dated to the late Carnian, approximately 229 million years ago.

== Discovery and naming ==
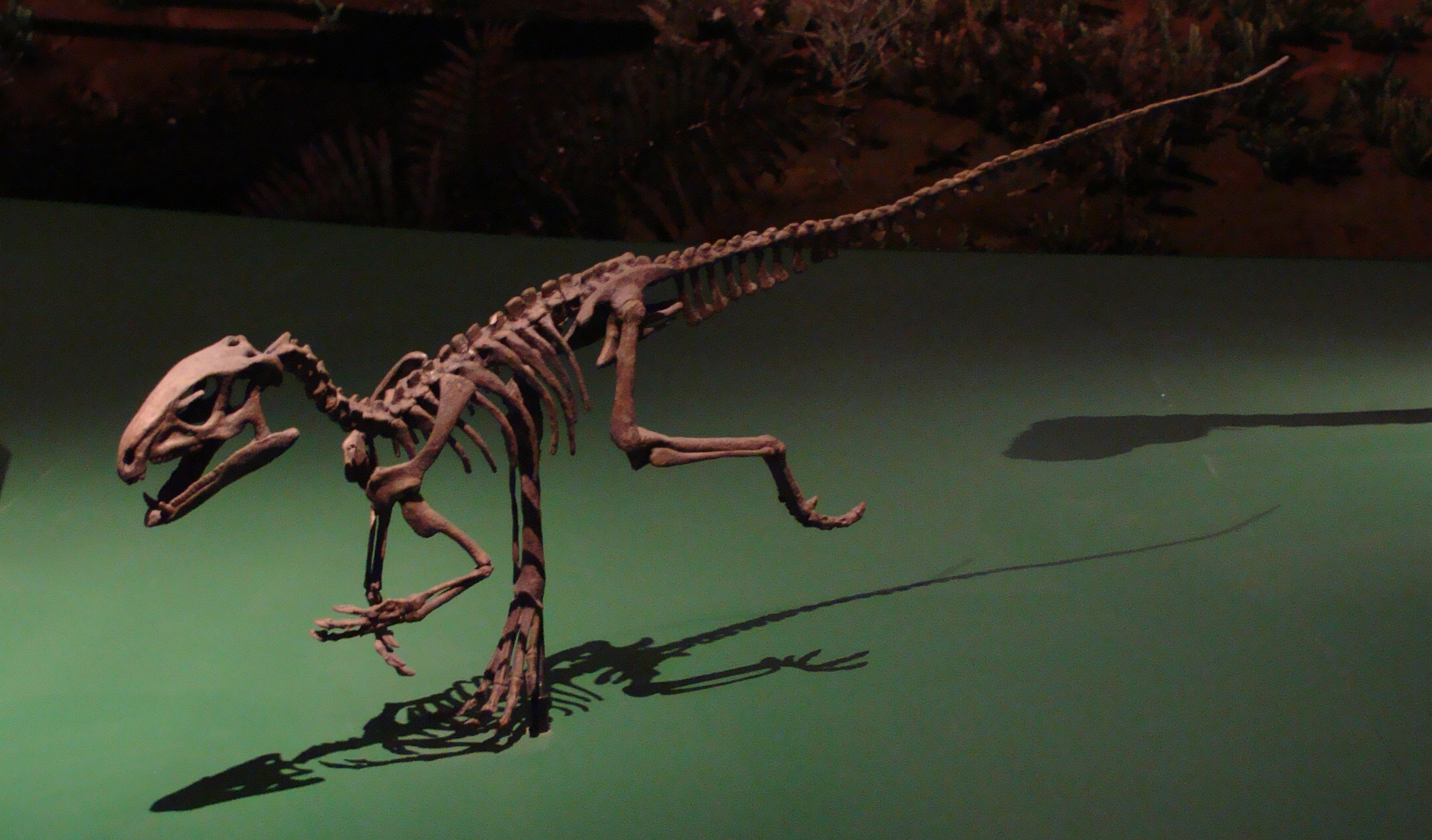
Reconstructed skeleton reflecting the traditional interpretation of Pisanosaurus as an ornithischian dinosaur, Royal Ontario Museum

Pisanosaurus is known from a single fragmented skeleton discovered in 1962 by Galileo Juan Scaglia at the Hoyada del Cerro Las Lajas locality (also known as Agua de Las Catas) in the Ischigualasto Formation of La Rioja Province, Argentina.

The genus is based on a specimen given the designation PVL 2577, which consists of a partial skull including a fragmentary right maxilla with teeth, and incomplete right mandibular ramus (lower jaw), six incomplete cervical vertebrae, seven incomplete dorsal vertebrae, molds of five sacral vertebrae, a rib and several rib fragments, a fragmentary right scapula, a coracoid, molds of a fragmentary ilium, ischium and pubic bone, an impression of three metacarpals, the complete femora, the right tibia, the right fibula, with an articulated astragalus and calcaneum, a tarsal element with a metatarsal, metatarsals III and IV, three phalanges from the third toe and five phalanges (including the ungual) from the fourth toe, and an indeterminate long bone fragment.

The genus name Pisanosaurus means "Pisano's lizard" and combines "Pisano" in honor of Argentine paleontologist Juan Arnaldo Pisano of La Plata Museum, with a Latin "saurus" from the Greek (σαύρα) meaning "lizard". Pisanosaurus was described and named by Argentine paleontologist Rodolfo Casamiquela in 1967. The type and only valid species known today is Pisanosaurus mertii. The specific name honors the late Araucanian naturalist Carlos Merti.

== Description ==
Based on the known fossil elements from a partial skeleton, Pisanosaurus was a small, lightly built dinosauriform, reaching 1–1.3 m (3.3–4.3 ft) in length and 2 kg (4.4 lb) in body mass. These estimates vary due to the incompleteness of the holotype specimen PVL 2577. The orientation of the pubis is uncertain, with some skeletal reconstructions having it projecting down and forward (the propubic condition) similar to that of the majority of saurischian dinosaurs.

According to a redescription by José Bonaparte in 1976, Pisanosaurus has some distinctive characteristics. The acetabulum (hip socket) is open. The peduncles of the ilium are short, resulting in a low and axially elongated acetabulum. The upper region of the ischium is wide, larger than that of the pubic bone. The metacarpals of the hand are apparently elongated, measuring about fifteen millimeters.

== Classification ==
- Ornithischia
  - Pisanosaurus
  - - Heterodontosauridae
      - Abrictosaurus
      - Heterodontosaurus
    - Genasauria
      - Thyreophora
      - Neornithischia

Cladogram of basal Ornithischia after Butler et al. (2008), showing the position of Pisanosaurus as the earliest example of an ornithischian.

Pisanosaurus is the type genus of the Pisanosauridae, a family erected by Casamiquela in the same paper which named Pisanosaurus. The family Pisanosauridae has fallen into disuse; a 1976 study considered the group synonymous with the already named Heterodontosauridae, though this is not followed by more recent studies; Reid, Fonseca & Madzia (2026) used Pisanosauridae when evaluating the history of ornithischian clade names and their synonymy.

The exact classification of Pisanosaurus has been the topic of debate by scientists for over 40 years; until 2017, the consensus was that Pisanosaurus is the oldest known ornithischian, part of a diverse group of dinosaurs which lived during nearly the entire span of the Mesozoic Era. More recently, some authors have begun to consider it a non-dinosaurian silesaurid, though this hypothesis has not reached a consensus either.

=== Ornithischian hypothesis ===
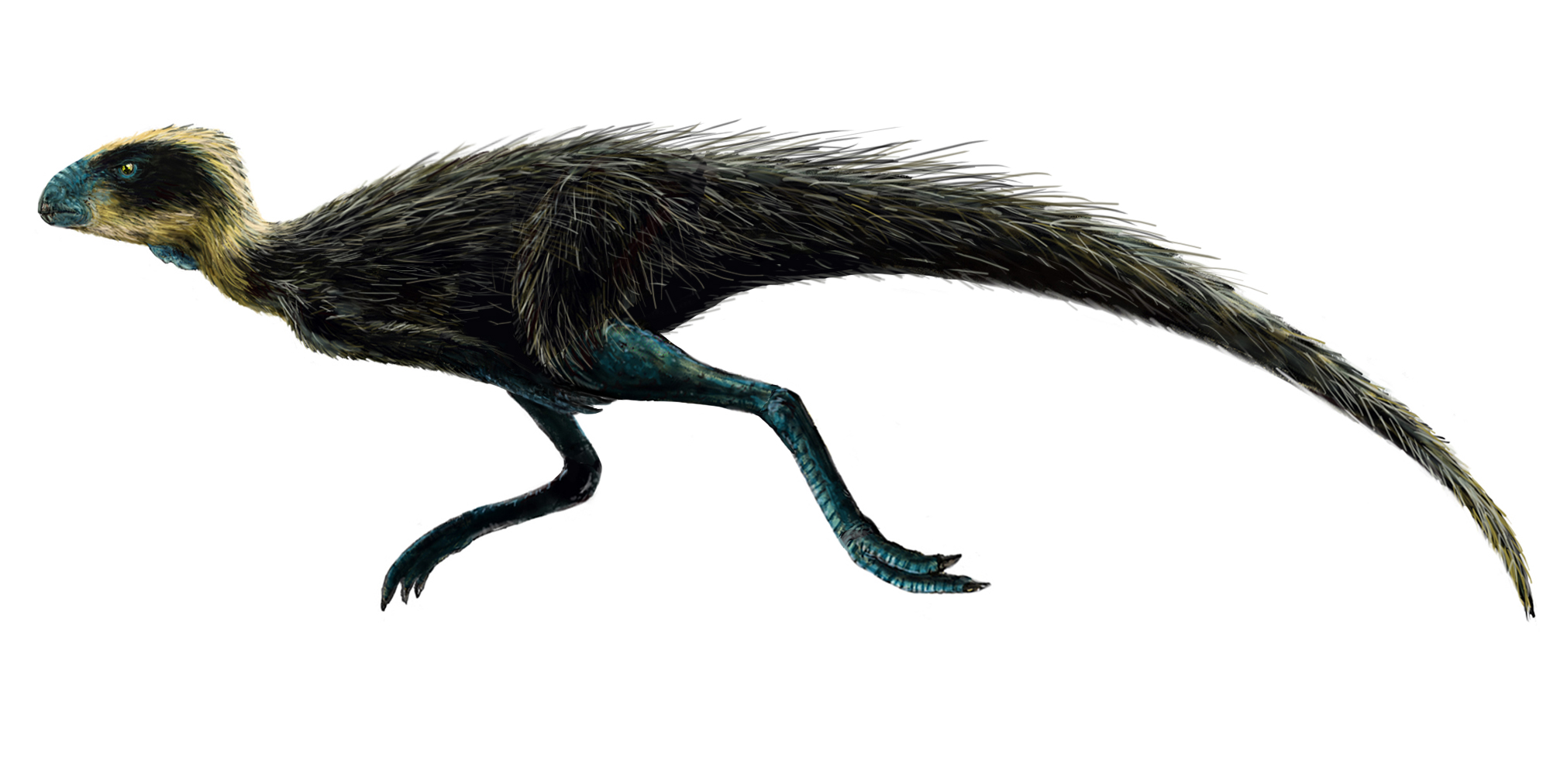
Restoration reflecting the traditional interpretation of Pisanosaurus as an ornithischian dinosaur

Pisanosaurus has traditionally been classified as very basal within Ornithischia; the postcrania seem to lack any good ornithischian synapomorphy and it was even suggested by Paul Sereno in 1991 that the fossil is a chimera. However, recent studies suggest that the fossils belong to a single specimen.

Over the years, Pisanosaurus has been classified as a heterodontosaurid, a fabrosaurid, a hypsilophodont and has also been considered the earliest known ornithischian. A 2008 study placed Pisanosaurus outside of (and more basal than) Heterodontosauridae. In this study, Pisanosaurus is the earliest and most primitive ornithischian. This assignment is also supported by Norman et al. (2004), Langer et al. (2009) and the controversial Ornithoscelida hypothesis of Baron, Norman & Barrett (2017). Other primitive ornithischians include Eocursor, Trimucrodon, and possibly Fabrosaurus.

The hypothesis of ornithischian affinities for Pisanosaurus has not fallen out of favor despite competition from alternative hypothesis. Silesaurid-like traits, for example, may be dinosaurian plesiomorphies (ancestral conditions) rather than unique characteristics of silesaurids.

=== Silesaurid hypothesis ===
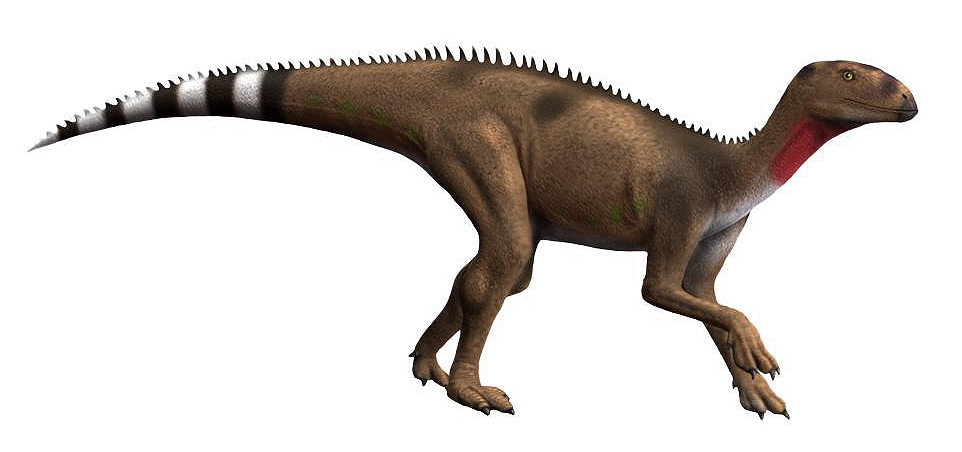
Restoration of Pisanosaurus as a silesaurid

A phylogenetic analysis informally conducted by Agnolin (2015) recovered Pisanosaurus as a possible non-dinosaurian member of Dinosauriformes related to the silesaurids. In 2017, two studies independently came to the conclusion that Pisanosaurus was a silesaurid: one was an expansive redescription by Agnolin and Rozadilla, and the other was a re-analyzed Ornithoscelida matrix by Baron, Norman, & Barrett. Pisanosaurus was also found as a silesaurid in a 2018 paper which combined the descriptive work of Agnolin and Rozadilla (2017) with the phylogenetic matrix of Baron, Norman, & Barrett (2017).

The placement of Pisanosaurus is reliant on the placement of silesaurids as a whole, a situation which has invited much debate. While Silesauridae is often considered a monophyletic sister group of dinosaurs, some studies consider it a paraphyletic grade ancestral to ornithischian dinosaurs in particular. One such study is Müller & Garcia (2020). Although they regarded Pisanosaurus as the basal-most ornithischian, taxa often considered members of Silesauridae form a step-wise arrangement up to Pisanosaurus. It acts a transitional form positioned on a rung between the "silesaurid" grade (Asilisaurus, Sacisaurus, Silesaurus, etc.) and traditional ornithischians (Eocursor, Scutellosaurus, Heterodontosaurus, etc.). This phylogenetic position may explain why some authors consider Pisanosaurus a silesaur and others consider it an ornithischian, as following Müller & Garcia, Pisanosaurus has traits of both groups.

== Paleoecology ==
The fossils of Pisanosaurus were discovered in the "Agua de las Catas" locality at the Ischigualasto Formation in La Rioja, Argentina. Originally dated to the Middle Triassic, this formation is now believed to belong to the Late Triassic Carnian stage, deposited approximately 228 to 216.5 million years ago. This specimen was collected by José Fernando Bonaparte, Rafael Herbst and the preparators Martín Vince and Scaglia in 1962, and is housed in the collection of the Laboratorio de Paleontologia de Vertebrados, Instituto "Miguel Lillo", in San Miguel de Tucumán, Argentina.

The Ischigualasto Formation was a volcanically active floodplain covered by forests, with a warm and humid climate, though subject to seasonal variations including strong rainfalls. Vegetation consisted of ferns, horsetails, and giant conifers, which formed highland forests along the banks of rivers. Herrerasaurus remains appear to have been the most common among the carnivores of the Ischigualasto Formation. Sereno (1993) noted that Pisanosaurus was found in "close association" with therapsids, rauisuchians, archosaurs, Saurosuchus and the dinosaurs Herrerasaurus and Eoraptor, all of whom lived in its paleoenvironment. Bonaparte (1976) postulated that Pisanosaurus played a role in a fauna dominated by therapsids. The large carnivore Herrerasaurus may have fed upon Pisanosaurus. Herbivores were represented by rhynchosaurs such as Hyperodapedon (a beaked reptile); aetosaurs (spiny armored reptiles); kannemeyeriid dicynodonts (stocky, front-heavy beaked quadrupedal animals) such as Ischigualastia; and traversodontids (somewhat similar in overall form to dicynodonts, but lacking beaks) such as Exaeretodon. These non-dinosaurian herbivores were much more abundant than early dinosaurs.
