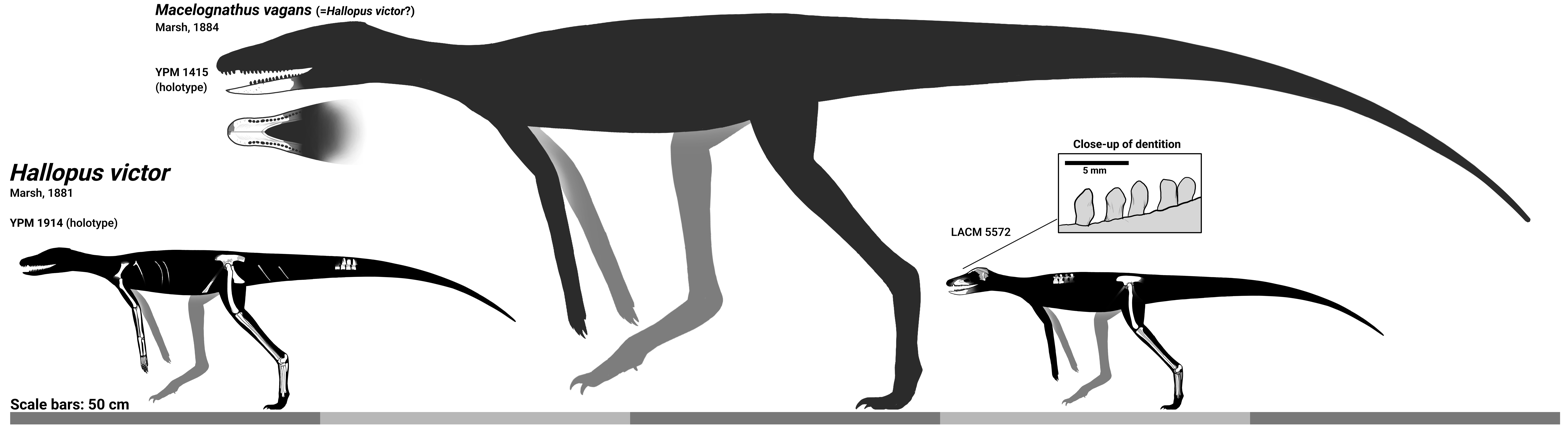
- Skeletal reconstruction of Hallopus victor and Macelognathus vagans, a possible junior synonym

Scientific classification
- Kingdom: Animalia
- Phylum: Chordata
- Class: Reptilia
- Clade: Pseudosuchia
- Clade: Crocodylomorpha
- Family: †Hallopodidae
- Genus: †Hallopus; Marsh, 1881

Type species
- †Nanosaurus victor Marsh, 1881

Synonyms
- Macelognathus vagans? Marsh, 1884; Nanosaurus victor Marsh, 1877

= Hallopus =

Hallopus Temporal range: Late Jurassic, 155.7–145.5 Ma

Extinct genus of reptiles

Hallopus is an extinct genus of small "sphenosuchian" crocodylomorph, known from the Late Jurassic Morrison Formation of North America. The only known species Hallopus victor was originally named in 1877 as a species of the dinosaur Nanosaurus, and was moved into its own genus by Othniel Charles Marsh in 1881. It was a quite small animal, reaching a length of 1 m (3.3ft) with long and slender limbs. Macelognathus, a similarly slender-proportioned crocodylomorph to Hallopus, may be synonymous with it.

== History and naming ==
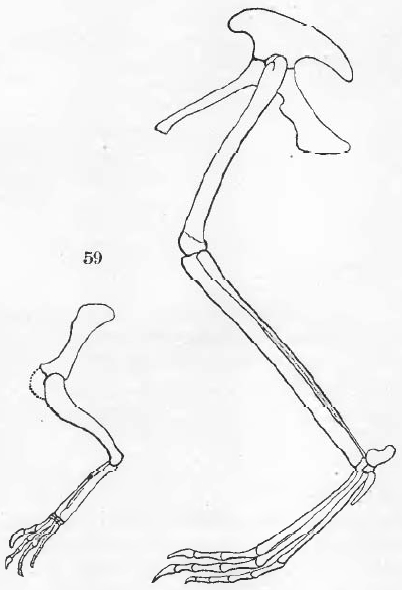
Outdated reocnstruction of the front and hind limb of Hallopus victor, with misidentified forelimb bones

The holotype specimen of Hallopus was discovered by near Canyon City, Colorado and acquired by a collector named Baldwin for three dollars in a local curiosity shop in Colorado Springs. According to letters later chronicled by Schuchert (1939), he found out about the fossil after hearing about the discovery of a supposed fossil bird, before later traveling to the type locality himself in search of additional remains.

The holotype consists of two slabs of rock containing the largely dissarticulated remains of a single individual known from elements of the spine and mostly limb material. Skull material was initially not identified, however later research by Walker proposes that some bone fragments may belong to it. Othniel Charles Marsh, who originally described the specimen the same year it was found, initially thought it to be a species of the small ornithischian Nanosaurus, naming it Nanosaurus victor. However Marsh was vague in his description of where the specimen originated, writing that it was "probably Jurassic" and assigning it to the lower part of the Dakota Group, despite detailed accounts of the locality being sent to him by Baldwin. The locality was merely identified as "Rocky Mountains" in this first publication.

Later, in 1881, Marsh erected the genus Hallopus, now recognizing it as a distinct genus but still believing it to be a dinosaur. The age of Hallopus was later revised by Marsh, successively assigning it to older and older strata culminating in a proposed Early Jurassic or even Late Triassic age. It was around this time that Marsh took further notice of Hallopus anatomy and speculated on how it fit within Dinosauria. Marsh coined both the family Hallopodidae and the suborder Hallopoda in 1881, placing them within Dinosauria.

In publications from 1882 and 1890 Marsh himself casts doubt on this however, growing doubtful of his prior hypothesis and arriving at the conclusion that Hallopus may be a link between typical dinosaurs and what he considered to be more primitive forms (aetosaurs, crocodilians and phytosaurs). He retains Hallopoda within Theropoda regardless and it was in 1890 that Hallopus received a full, detailed description figuring the type material, which was later expanded upon and revised throughout the 1890s. The first full image of the two rock slabs that contain the holotype were published by von Huene in 1914, who still believed Hallopus to be a theropod.

In 1939, Charles Schuchert suggested that Marsh was correct in his first assumption, which proposed that Hallopus was found in the upper members of the Morrison Formation. His research cites a series of letters exchanged between Marsh and Baldwin specifically concerning where the fossil was found. In his work, Schuchert presumes a rocky hill known as "The Nipple" to be where Hallopus originated, but his research contains a series of contradictions that cast doubt over the specifics. Regardless of the mystery surrounding the exact locality, the description offered by Baldwin and the highly specialised skeletal adaptations both support an assignment to the late Jurassic. The reason Marsh continuously revised the age of Hallopus may have been that he was simply unaware of any Upper Morrison sediments matching the given description, which were later confirmed to exist around "The Nipple" by Ague, Carpenter & Ostrom in 1995. One consequence of Marsh's revisions is that the "Hallopus Beds" named by him did not actually contain any material of Hallopus. As far as the material itself was concerned, no detailed examinations of the fossils were published following von Huene's 1914 paper and researchers of the time consistently placed the animal within Coelurosauria until 1970, when Alick Walker published his re-description and concluded that Hallopus was in fact a Pseudosuchian, a classification maintained until today.

The name Hallopus is derived from the Greek άλλομαι (hallomai), meaning "jumping" and ποΰς (pous) which translates to "foot".

== Description ==
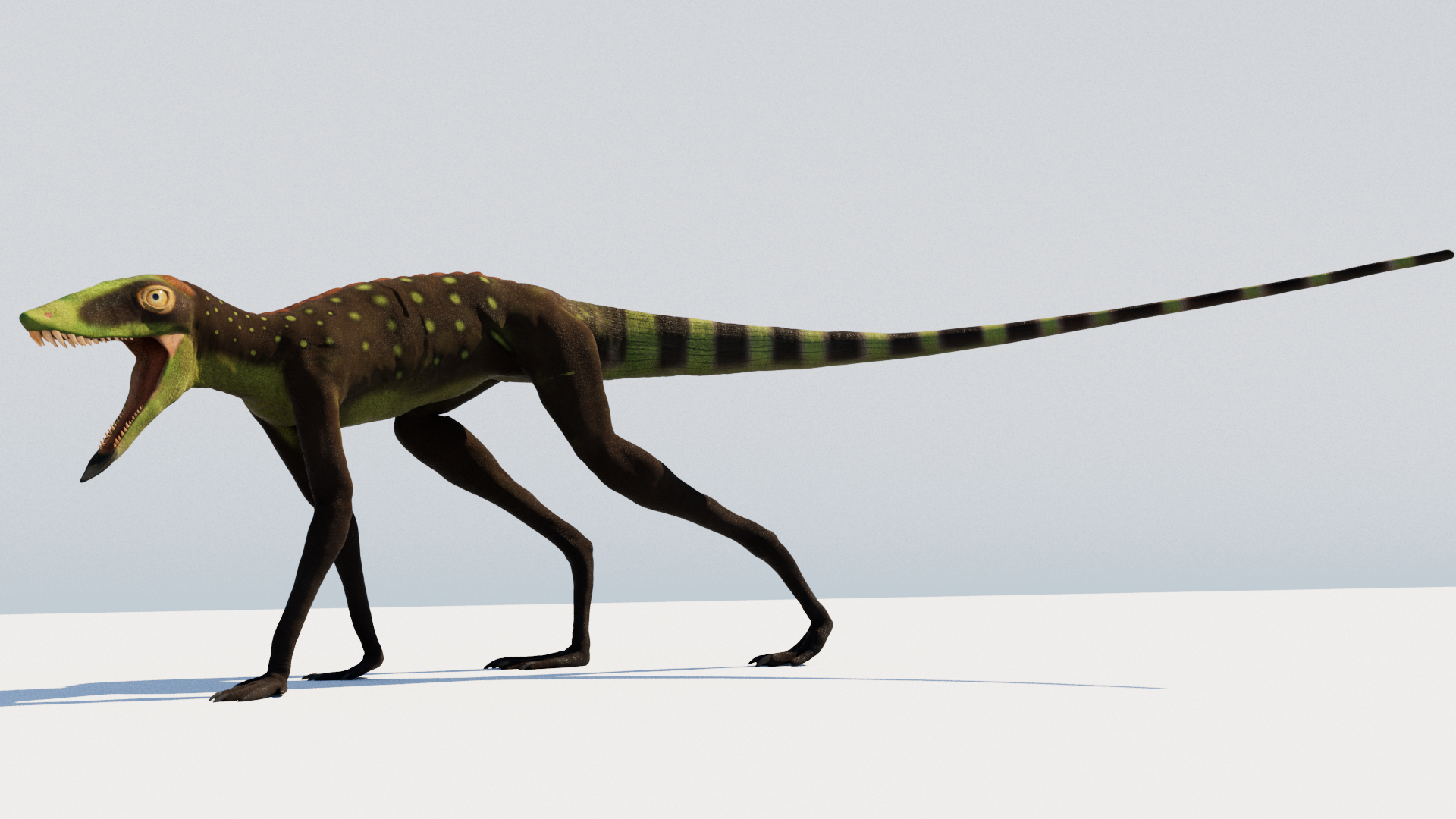
A 3D CGI reconstruction of H. victor

Overall Hallopus was a relatively small and gracile animal with strongly elongated limbs, five fingers on each hand and effectively tridactyl hindlimbs. Early size estimates of Hallopus by Marsh were vague, describing it as being "the size of a fox" and later likening it to rabbits in size. Using the proportions of various sphenosuchians, especially Pedeticosaurus, Walker estimates a total body length of approximately 62 cm (24 in).

Like typical for crocodylomorphs, Hallopus possessed two sacral vertebrae, which in the holotype are firmly ossified, leaving no trace of a suture between them. Previous authors hypothesized the presence of a third sacral, however Walker deems this unlikely, partly due to how firmly the two known vertebrae are fused. A series of four caudal vertebrae is known, which are notably smaller than the sacrals and likely from much further down the tail. A few other poorly preserved vertebrae of indetermined position are also preserved on the rock slab and Walker also describes several rib fragments and a chevron. The humerus is known from a series of impressions as well as the preserved distal end, which shows that the bone was hollow. The narrow distal end of the humerus marked by a deep groove at its posterior, combined with the shortened olecranon process, suggests that Hallopus was capable of stretching its forearms in a way that would create a straight line between it and the humerus.

The radiale and ulnare were likewise elongated, most likely functioning as an extension of the radius and ulna rather than an independent element. In mammals the radius is known to exceed the humerus length significantly in some species, but even compared to these the ratio between humerus and radiale+radius in Hallopus is exceptional at a total of 146%, only exceeded in proportions by giraffes. The comparison to mammals however does not extend to the metacarpals, which are proportionally short (only 26% the length of the humerus). The joints of the wrist were relatively stiff, which effectively increases the length of the forearm. Walker suggests that these joints would not be completely immobile, reasoning that if that had been the case simple elongation of the forearms would have been a more reasonable adaptation. Based on the elongation of the metacarpals, it's believed that the forelimbs of Hallopus may have been digitigrade, further supported by the way length is distributed throughout the finger bones and the way the first and last finger converge towards the central metacarpals. Digit one in this case shows signs of being perpetually flexed and would have acted as stabilisers, touching the ground behind and to the sides of the central fingers.

The femur was rather restricted in its movement, only capable of moving in a parasagittal manner (back and forth) due to its offset femur head and the presence of a lesser trochanter. The hindlimbs likewise were probably digitigrade and effectively tridactyl as the central three toes were effectively locked together at their base before diverging towards their tips. The centralmost toe (digit three) is the longest of the pairing. The feet were long, with the bones of the central digits likely being about as long as the metatarsals, and the entire pes being about the same length as the tibia (which itself is longer than the femur). The heel was narrow and lacked the groove seen in modern crocodiles, suggesting that it functions like a lever similar to what can be observed in cursorial mammals.

== Phylogeny ==
The classification of Hallopus has a long history dominated by two main hypothesis that placed it on vastly different branches of the archosaur family tree. For almost a hundred years Hallopus was considered a dinosaur until its crocodylomorph affinities were recognized in the 1970s. Walker identified multiple anatomical details that clearly established that Hallopus was a pseudosuchian, specifically less derived than Protosuchus or Orthosuchus. In this publication, he considered Hallopus as a descendant of a clade he named Pedeticosauridae, which is now thought to be synonymous with the likely paraphyletic Sphenosuchia, a clade of gracile, long limbed crocodylomorphs from the Triassic-Jurassic. A phylogenetic analysis from 2017 recovered Hallopus in a clade with Macelognathus and Almadasuchus, the Hallopodidae (defined as "all taxa more closely related to Hallopus victor than to Protosuchus richardsoni or Dibothrosuchus elaphros). Hallopodidae was recovered as the nearest sister to the Crocodyliformes and more derived than Junggarsuchus or the "sphenosuchians" whose monophyly was not supported in this analysis.

- Crocodylomorpha
  - Carnufex
  - Redondavenator
  - CM 73372
  - Erpetosuchus
  - - - Saltoposuchus
      - - Terrestrisuchus
        - Litargosuchus
    - - - Hesperosuchus
        - - Dromicosuchus
          - Kayentasuchus
      - - Sphenosuchus
        - - Dibothrosuchus
          - - Junggarsuchus
            - - Hallopodidae
                - Almadasuchus
                - - Macelognathus
                  - Hallopus
              - Crocodyliformes
                - - Hemiprotosuchus
                  - Protosuchus
                - - Orthosuchus
                  - - Gobiosuchus
                    - - Sichuanosuchus
                      - - Zosuchus
                        - Mesoeucrocodylia

- Loricata
  - Postosuchus
  - - Carnufex
    - - Hesperosuchus
      - - - Pseudhesperosuchus
          - Trialestes
        - - Kayentasuchus
          - Dromicosuchus
          - - Terrestrisuchus
            - - Redondavenator
              - Litargosuchus
          - - Sphenosuchus
            - - Dibothrosuchus
              - - Hallopus victor
                - Solidocrania
                  - - Phyllodontosuchus
                    - Junggarsuchus
                  - - Macelognathus
                    - - Almadasuchus
                      - Crocodyliformes

In 2022 Ruebenstahl and colleagues published an extensive description of Junggarsuchus using CT-scans while also comparing it to other early diverging crocodylomorphs, in particular Dibothrosuchus. They furthermore analysed traits used in prior analysis critically and built a data matrix based on previously established phylogenies including that of Leardi (2017). The analysis included all by then known early diverging crocodylomorphs and tested the results by introducing several variations in outgroup taxa and weighting methods. In the process of this research, a new clade, Solidocrania, was named. With the exception of some analysis using implied weight, Sphenosuchia was generally found to be paraphyletic by the authors. Even in the scenario of a monophyletic grouping there was weak support. A monophyletic Hallopodidae was only recovered under implied weighting, where it retained its position as a sister group to Crocodylomorpha. Instead Ruebenstahl and colleagues find Hallopus to be a sister taxon to Solidocrania, which contains Macelognathus, Junggarsuchus and Almadasuchus. However the lack of well preserved cranial material renders the genus' position uncertain. Shown below is one of the trees recovered by the publication, recovered using Postosuchus as the outgroup and under implied weighting of characters.

The proximity between Hallopus and Macelognathus has led to some taxonomic issues in the recent past. In their 2005 publication of Macelognathus, Göhlich and colleagues note several similarities between the two taxa, which may have been roughly contemporary with one another. Leardi and colleagues however note that many of these similarities are widespread among non-crocodyliform crocodylomorphs while some of the differences in proportions are difficult to observe in the fossils. The fact that the braincase is only preserved for Macelognathus makes comparison between the two taxa difficult as well. Leardi and colleagues conclude that the two may be synonymous, however closer inspection of Hallopus holotype or additional material clearly referrable to the taxon would be required to be sure.

== Paleobiology ==
Based on its light build and extremely elongated limbs, Hallopus was most likely a fast-running agile animal. Walker proposes that while running the forelimbs would have performed a kind of strut, with the anterior part of the body bouncing off to allow for a greater stridelength. Walker further argues that this might compensate for the much longer hindlimbs by raising the glenoids, and proposed that Hallopus would have been capable of moving in ways similar to hares and greyhounds. Of the two, mountain hares were noted to be the closest modern analogy as far as the proportions between individual bones and entire limbs were concerned. These proportions alongside the shape of the calcaneal may suggest a bounding gait for Hallopus, however Walker warns that the analogy is not a perfect one and that Hallopus would still be relatively restricted in its movement compared to extant mammals. Subsequently it cannot be determined if the hindlimbs could have passed the forelimbs while galloping without knowing how short or flexible the spine was. The long tail, inferred based on its relatives and the recovered caudal vertebrae, would have also made a substantial difference.

The lack of skull material relevant to the jaws leaves Hallopus diet ambiguous. However, the closely related, if not synonymous Macelognathus does preserve pieces of the jaw, displaying a unique toothless mandible tip, possibly covered by a keratinous rhamphotheca. The teeth of Macelognathus meanwhile are unserrated and mediolaterally flattened, not matching a carnivorous diet and instead being better suited for consuming insects and plant material.
