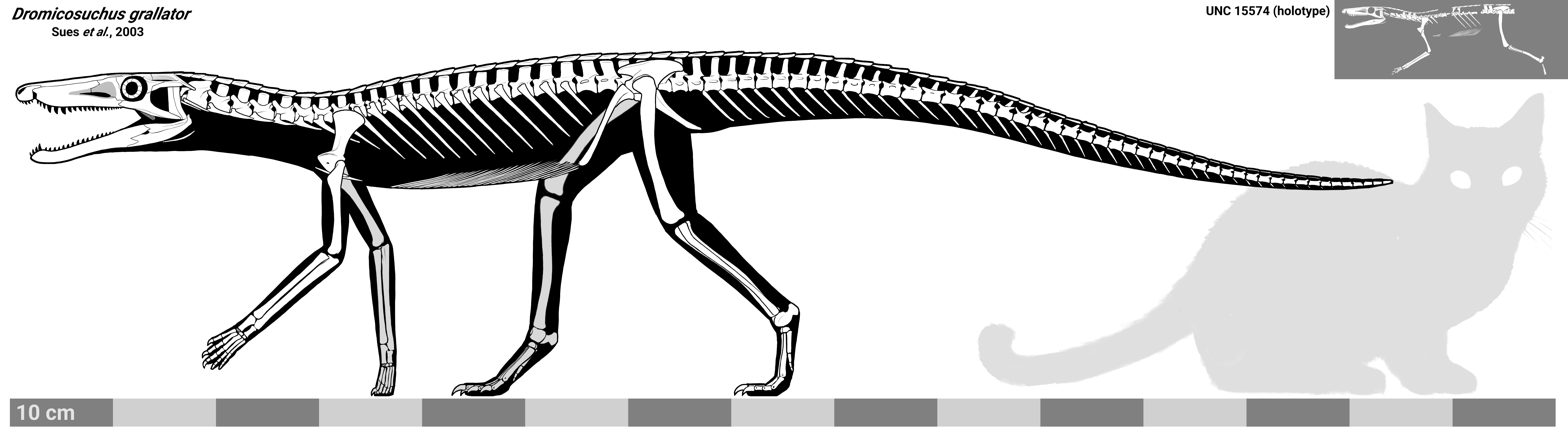
- Skeletal reconstruction of Dromicosuchus
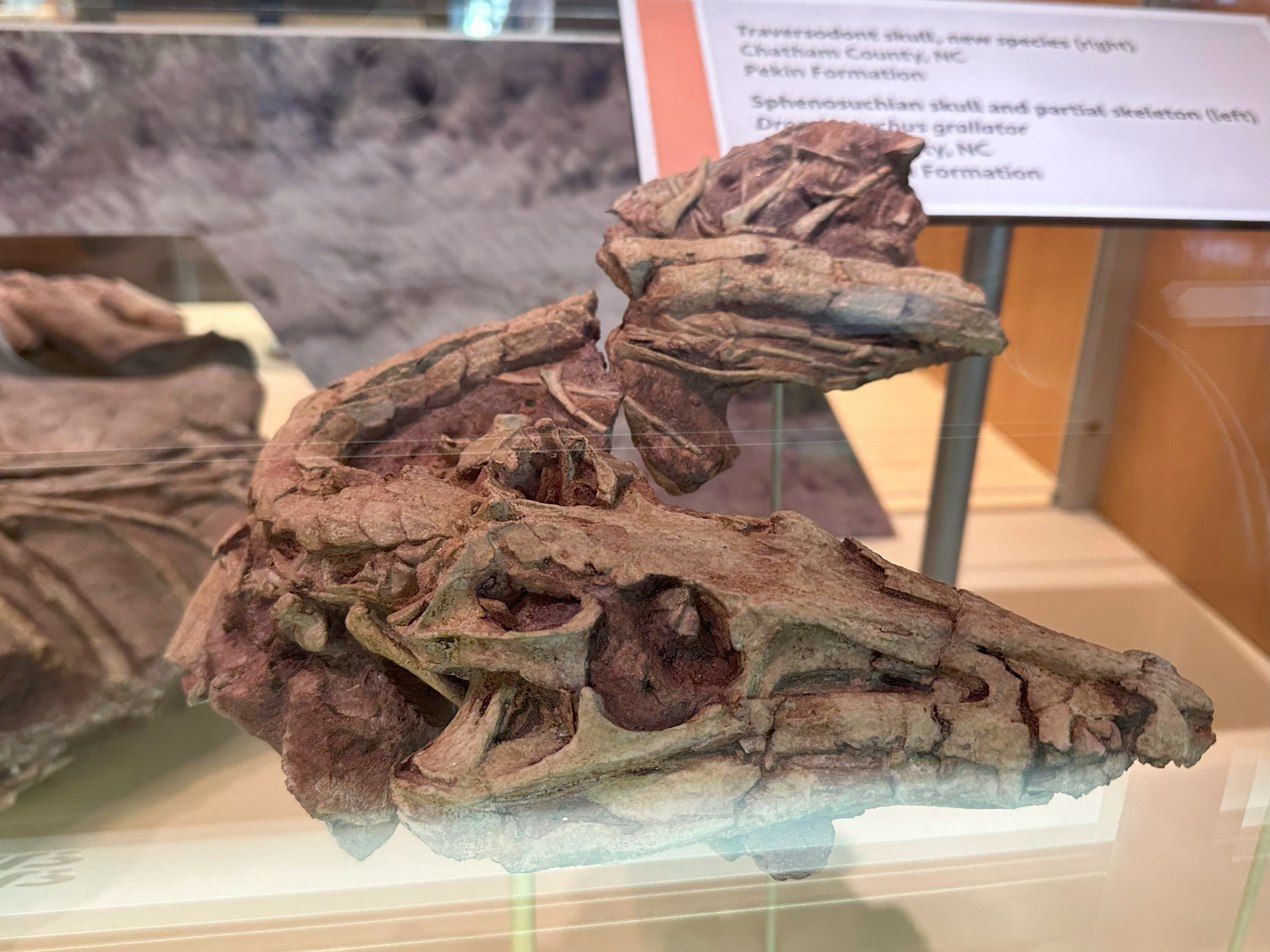
- Holotype at the North Carolina Museum of Natural Sciences

Scientific classification
- Kingdom: Animalia
- Phylum: Chordata
- Class: Reptilia
- Clade: Archosauria
- Clade: Pseudosuchia
- Clade: Crocodylomorpha
- Genus: †Dromicosuchus; Sues et al., 2003
- Species: †D. grallator

Binomial name
- †Dromicosuchus grallator Sues et al., 2003

= Dromicosuchus =

Dromicosuchus Temporal range: Late Triassic

Extinct genus of reptiles

Dromicosuchus (Ancient Greek, meaning "fleet or quickly walking crocodile") is an extinct genus of sphenosuchian, a type of basal crocodylomorph, the clade that comprises the crocodilians and their closest kin. It was found in Upper Triassic rocks of North Carolina, United States, and is known from a nearly complete skull and partial skeleton. This specimen is unusual in that it was found beneath the skeleton of a larger rauisuchian (Postosuchus alisonae) and has apparent bite damage, suggesting that it was attacked by the larger carnivore before both died and were buried together.

== Discovery ==
The holotype of Dromicosuchus is a partial skeleton including a nearly complete skull and lower jaws, articulated vertebrae from the atlas to the second tail vertebra, bony armor from the back, ribs and the dermal bones called gastralia, partial shoulder girdles, most of the left arm and leg, and the right upper arm, thigh bone, and shin bone. It was found with the fossils of several other animals in a brick-clay quarry in Durham County, North Carolina, in blocks excavated by University of North Carolina at Chapel Hill students in fall 1994. The fossils came from a mudstone next to a river channel deposit, in Lithofacies Association II of the Deep River basin, part of the extensive Newark Supergroup, dated as pertaining to either the late Carnian or early Norian faunal stages of the Late Triassic. The type species is D. grallator, meaning "one who walks on stilts" in Latin, in reference to its long slender limbs. It was named and described by Hans-Dieter Sues and colleagues in 2003.

When the students excavated the blocks, the fossils were initially identified as the remains as a large, unnamed new genus of poposaurid suchian, which were later described as a new species of Postosuchus (P. alisonae) in 2008. Upon preparation, however, it was discovered that there was the skeleton of a smaller archosaur under its pelvis, and the bones of several different animals as gut contents that remained in place in the rauisuchian fossil: these included bones and scutes of the aetosaur Stegomus, some with tooth marks; bones from the snout, arm, and shoulder of the traversodont cynodont Plinthogomphodon; phalanx bones of a dicynodont; and a bone fragment from a possible temnospondyl. Additionally, the small archosaur, later named Dromicosuchus, had damage to its neck armor and lower jaw that appears to have been caused by rauisuchian teeth, perhaps those of the animal that was found above it.

== Description of the specimen, UNC 15574 ==
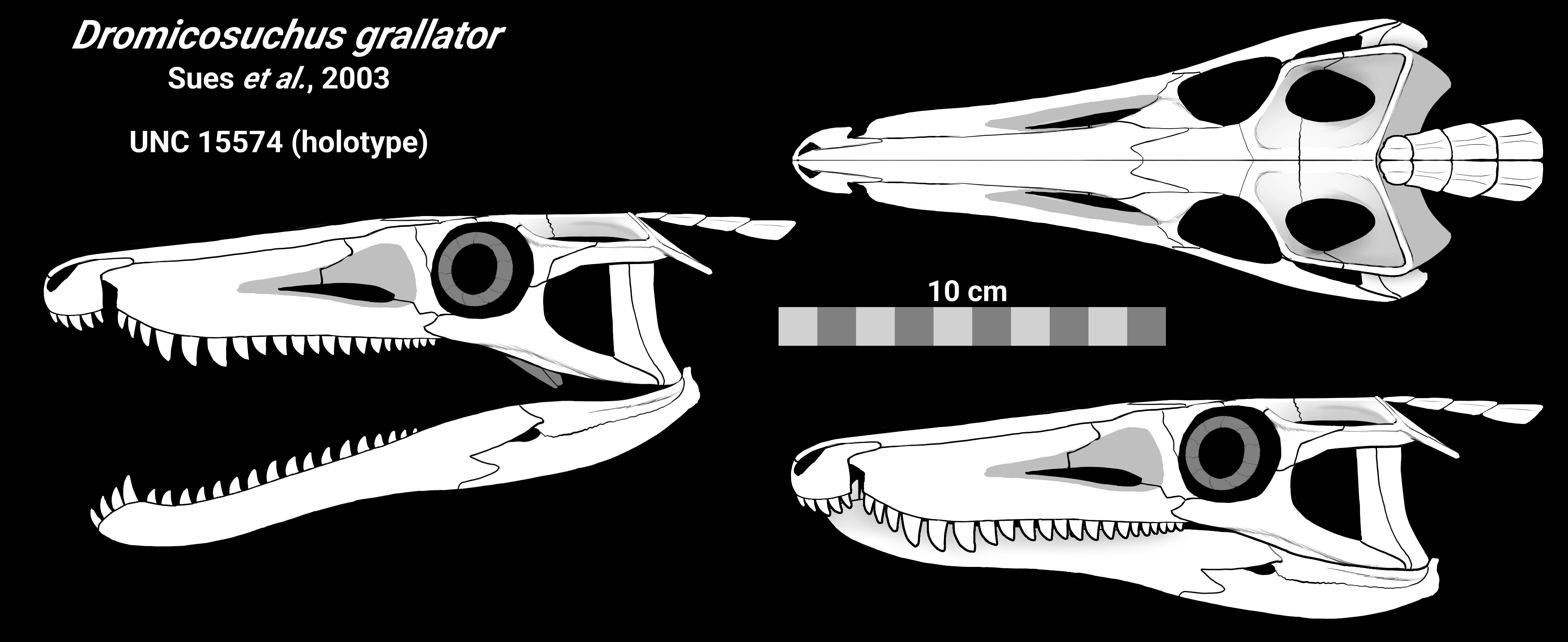
Skull diagram

The skeleton of the type and only known individual of Dromicosuchus is similarly proportioned to that of Hesperosuchus agilis, and the animal is estimated as 1.2 to 1.3 meters (3.9 to 4.3 ft) long. The age of the animal is not completely clear, because some bones that are ordinarily expected to be fused in adults are fused, but others may not be. The fusion of two shoulder bones suggests that it was mature. The skull was lightly built and triangular, and about 150 millimeters (5.9 inches) long from the snout to the forward-most part of the occipital margin. The eye sockets were circular and about 30 millimeters (1.2 inches) in diameter. There were five teeth per premaxilla (the paired bones that made up the snout), twenty per maxilla (the paired bones that made up the cheeks), and an unknown number in the lower jaw. The teeth differed slightly from the tip of the snout to the cheeks, having more flattened cross-sections and stronger curves in the cheek. The third or fourth tooth of the lower jaw was notably enlarged, fitting into a notch in the upper jaw between the premaxilla and maxilla.

There were at least 23 vertebrae from the skull to the hips. Nine or ten may have been neck vertebrae, the rest forming the back. The hip had two vertebrae anchoring it. Two rows of scutes ran along the middle of the back, as in other basal crocodylomorphs. The limbs are more complete on the left side; the left upper arm was 89 millimeters (3.5 inches) long, and left ulna was 102 millimeters (4.0 inches) long, so the forearm was noticeably longer than the upper arm. The hand was small. For the left hindlimb, the thigh bone was 144 millimeters (5.7 inches) long and the shin was 130 millimeters (5.1 inches) long.

== Classification ==
Sues and his colleagues performed a phylogenetic analysis and found that their new genus (identified as Dromaeosuchus in the diagrams) grouped as a sphenosuchian, possibly closest to Hesperosuchus and Kayentasuchus. Sphenosuchia is a poorly understood and controversial clade of early crocodile relatives, known from the Late Triassic and Jurassic, and it may be paraphyletic, not a natural group. Sues and colleagues found a clade of sphenosuchians in their analysis, but it was weakly supported.

Cladogram from Bodenham et al. 2026:

- - Suchia
    - Stagonolepis
    - - Gracilisuchus
      - - Saurosuchus
        - - Postosuchus
          - Crocodylomorpha
            - CM 73372
            - Carnufex
            - Redondavenator
            - Erpetosuchus
            - - - Trialestes
                - Pseudohesperosuchus
              - - Saltoposuchidae
                  - Saltoposuchus
                  - - Litargosuchus
                    - - Terrestrisuchus
                      - Galahadosuchus
                - - - Hesperosuchus
                    - - Dromicosuchus
                      - Kayentasuchus
                  - - Sphenosuchus
                    - - Dibothrosuchus
                      - - Junggarsuchus
                        - - - Almadasuchus
                            - - Macelognathus
                              - Hallopus
                          - Crocodyliformes
