= Parrishia =

Parrishia Temporal range: Late Triassic 221.5–205.6 Ma

Scientific classification
- Kingdom: Animalia
- Phylum: Chordata
- Class: Reptilia
- Clade: Archosauria
- Clade: Pseudosuchia
- Clade: Crocodylomorpha
- Genus: †Parrishia; Long and Murry, 1995

Type species
- †P. mccreai Long and Murry, 1995

Extinct genus of reptiles

Parrishia is an extinct genus of sphenosuchian crocodylomorph known from the Late Triassic Chinle, Dockum, and Santa Rosa Formations in Arizona and New Mexico.

== Discovery and naming ==
The genus was named in 1995 from fossils found from the Placerias quarry of the Chinle Group in Apache County, Arizona. It was named after the paleontologist J. Michael Parrish, with the type species being P. mccreai. Parrishia was distinguished from the closely related genus Hesperosuchus on the basis of more robust vertebral centra and the lack of dorsoventrally offset articular faces of the cervical centra, thus causing the neck to be straight rather than anterodorsally curved as in Hesperosuchus.

In their description of a new crocodylomorph skeleton from the famous Whitaker quarry in Ghost Ranch, Clark et al. (2000) treated Parrishia as a nomen dubium because they considered the holotype and referred specimens undiagnostic. More complete postcranial skeletons such as PEFO 26681 have been found that clearly show that the cervical centra of Parrishia possess articular faces that are dorsoventrally offset as in Hesperosuchus. Additionally, in the holotype specimen (UCMP A269/139623) the anterior surfaces of the centa are positioned more dorsally than the posterior surfaces, giving the neck an anterodorsal curve like Hesperosuchus. Therefore, the only distinguishing character that distinguishes Parrishia from Hesperosuchus is the robustness of the vertebrae. Material from Parrishia cannot be assigned to any other known sphenosuchian genus because of the lack of postcranial apomorphies; as a result, it is considered an indeterminate genus.

In an SVP 2018 conference abstract, William Parker and colleagues reported the discovery of new specimens indicating that Parrishia represents a phytosaur and not a crocodylomorph.
