= Artzosuchus =

Artzosuchus Temporal range: Upper Cretaceous

Scientific classification
- Kingdom: Animalia
- Phylum: Chordata
- Class: Reptilia
- Clade: Pseudosuchia
- Clade: Crocodylomorpha
- Genus: †Artzosuchus; Efimov, 1983

Type species
- A. brachicephalus Efimov, 1983

Extinct genus of reptiles

Artzosuchus is an extinct genus of basal crocodylomorph that lived during the Late Cretaceous period in Mongolia. It is a monospecific genus containing only one species, Artzosuchus brachicephalus.

Specimens have been found from the Üüden Sair locality of the Djadochta Formation in Mongolia and date back to the Campanian stage of the Late Cretaceous. Its classification beyond that of a basal crocodylomorph is indeterminant because of the fragmentary nature of the material associated with the genus.
