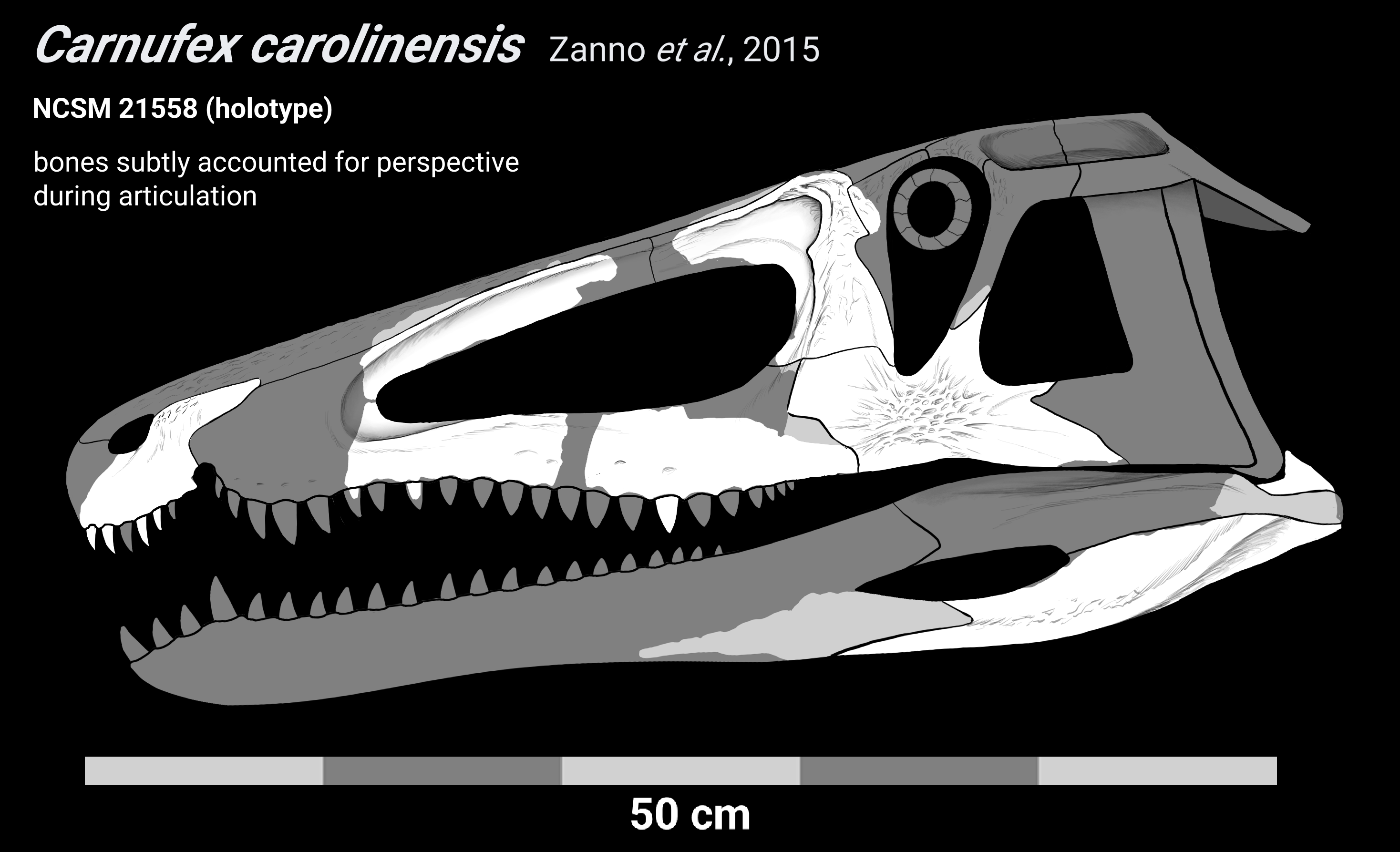
- Skull diagram
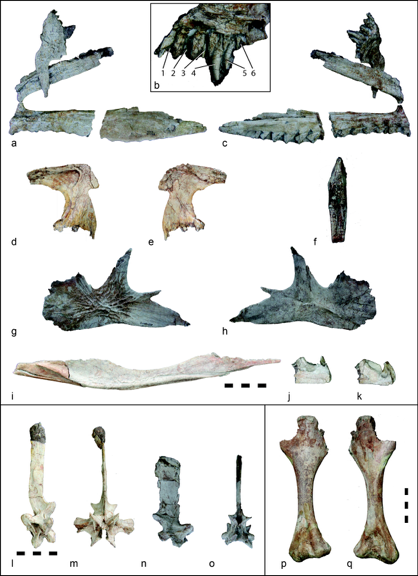
- Most of the preserved holotype elements

Scientific classification
- Kingdom: Animalia
- Phylum: Chordata
- Clade: Pseudosuchia
- Clade: Crocodylomorpha
- Genus: †Carnufex; Zanno et al., 2015
- Species: †C. carolinensis

Binomial name
- †Carnufex carolinensis Zanno et al., 2015

= Carnufex =

Carnufex Temporal range: Late Triassic, 231 Ma

Extinct genus of reptiles

Carnufex is an extinct genus of crocodylomorph suchian from the Late Triassic of North America. The genus was first described in 2015 by Zanno et al., who named the binomial Carnufex carolinensis, meaning "Carolina butcher". Two specimens are known, the holotype skull and skeleton NCSM 21558, and the referred humerus NCSM 21623. The specimens are from the Carnian-age Pekin Formation, which dates to 231 million years ago. Based on the holotype, Carnufex would have been about 3 m (9.8 ft) long and 1.5 m (4.9 ft) tall, although it may have gotten larger due to the holotype not being fully grown.

== Discovery ==
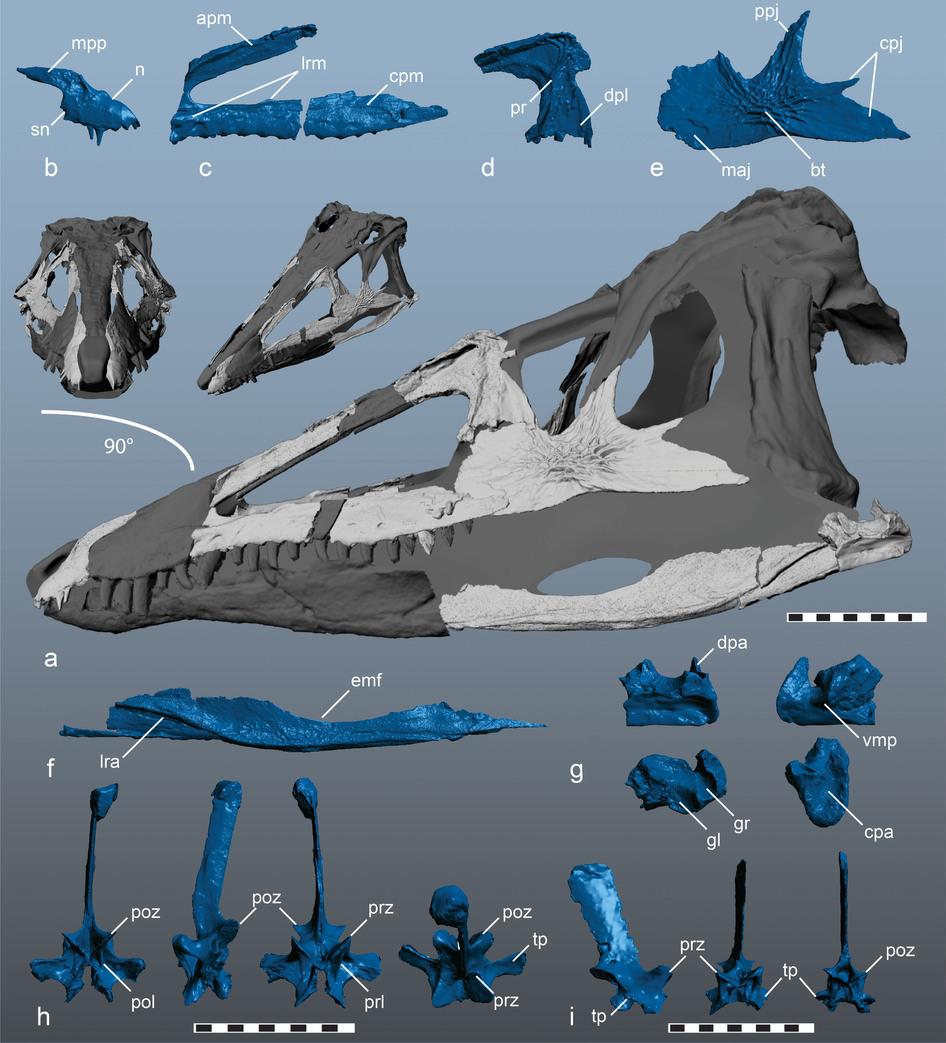
3D visualization of holotype elements

NCSM 21558 was discovered in a red fluvial conglomerate belonging to the mid-upper portion Pekin Formation of North Carolina, which formed in the Carnian age of the Late Triassic, around 231 million years ago. This specimen was described in a 2015 Scientific Reports article by Lindsay E. Zanno, Susan Drymala, Sterling J. Nesbitt, and Vincent P. Schneider. For the specimen and associated NCSM 21623, from the same level of the formation, they named the new binomial Carnufex carolinensis. This name is derived from the Latin word carnufex, for "butcher" and the location of the discovery in North Carolina. The holotype NCSM 21558 includes most regions of the skeleton: a partial skull (premaxilla, maxilla, lacrimal, and jugal), portions of the jaw (angular and articular), an atlantal intercentrum, neural arches from a cervical and dorsal vertebra, ribs, and an upper arm bone (humerus). A single referred specimen, NCSM 21623, is represented by part of a humerus, smaller than that of the holotype. The holotype and referred specimen were described in more detail by Drymala and Zanno in a 2016 PLOS One article.

== Description ==
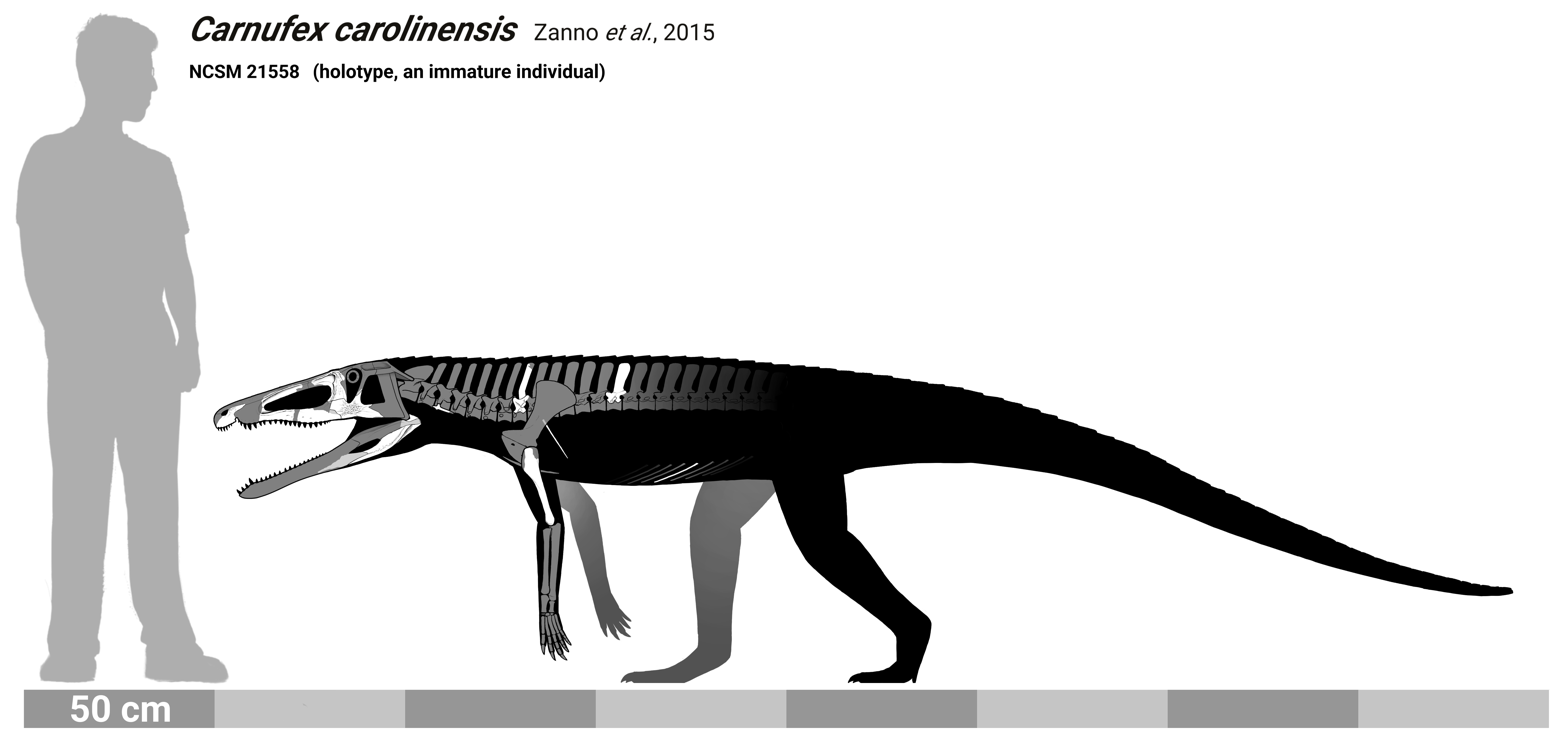
Skeletal diagram and hypothetical size comparison, known bones in white. This holotype individual is likely a juvenile

The size of the holotype specimen is difficult to assess, as the two most characteristic elements of the skeleton, the skull and the humerus, are proportionally unusual. Estimating body size from the skull predicts a much larger humerus, and estimating it from the humerus predicts a much smaller skull. This may indicate that the skull was unusually large, the forelimbs were unusually small, or both. Roughly scaling from local crocodylomorph taxa such as Dromicosuchus and an undescribed species (specimen NCSM 21722), Zanno et al. (2015) provided an estimated length of 3 m (9.8 ft). However, it likely grew larger, as the holotype specimen was immature owing to the unossified neurocentral sutures. Along with Redondavenator and CM 73372 (another undescribed species), Carnufex was among the largest Triassic crocodylomorphs. These three were among the earliest crocodylomorphs, casting doubt on the hypothesis that characteristic crocodylomorph features evolved after a reduction in body size, rather than before. Carnufex possesses a myriad of features characteristic of both crocodylomorphs and their more distant ancestors, reptiles like Postosuchus. However, it is also highly autapomorphic, meaning that it possessed many other features which are completely unique to it, distinguishing it from its close relatives. The skull was large, elongated, and heavily textured in some areas, while the forelimbs were small.

=== Skull ===
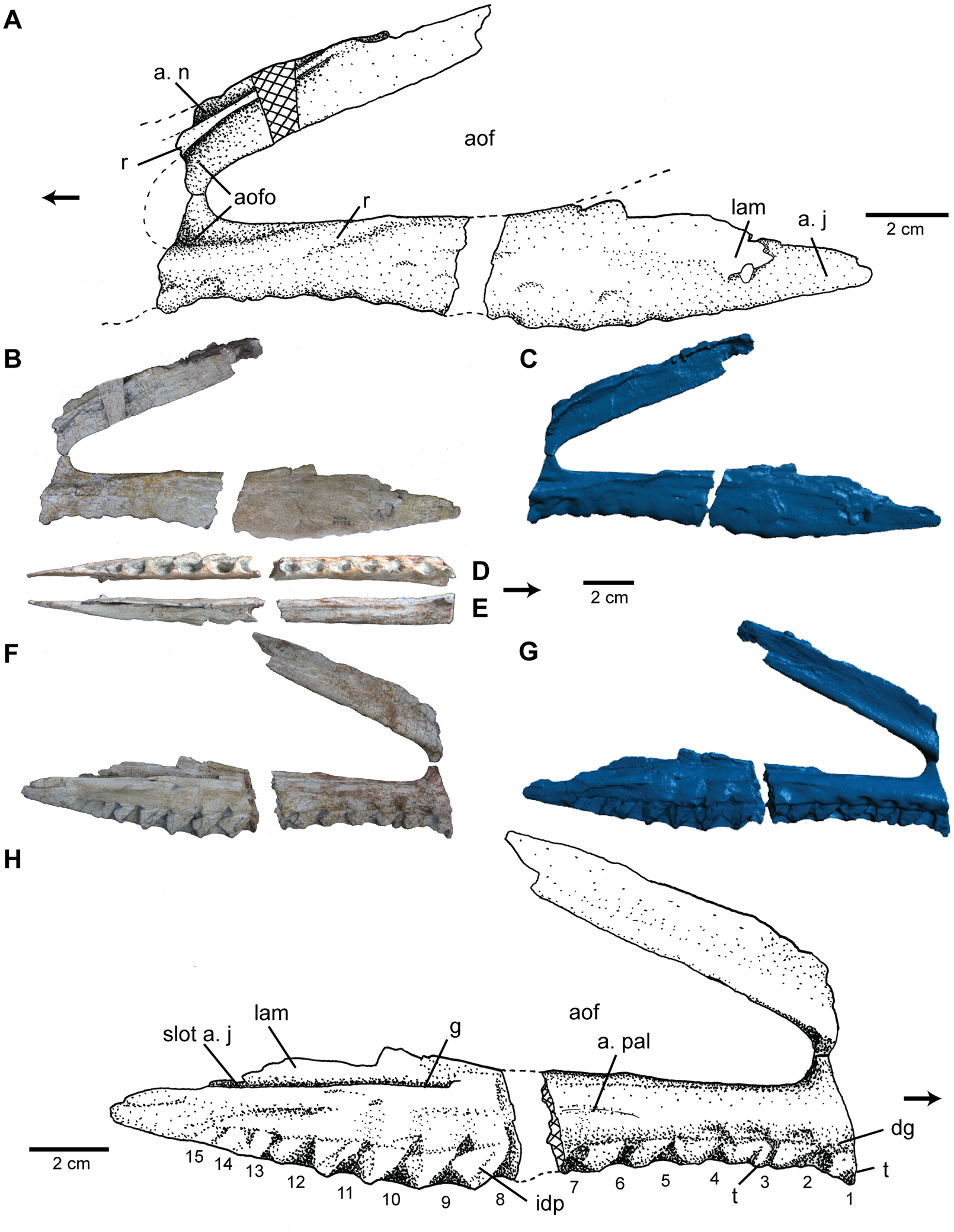
Maxilla of the holotype

The low premaxilla possessed at least six teeth and a notch at the rear of the tooth row, similar to Dromicosuchus. Like other archosaurs, the premaxilla has a palatal process, an internally-oriented projection which forms the front of the palate (roof of the mouth). There is a conspicuous gap in this process which may have manifested as a small hole in the palate. This hole is also observed in certain other early crocodylomorphs, and it may accommodate an enlarged fourth tooth of the lower jaw. Premaxillary teeth are slender, serrated, and recurved. The maxilla has a long ascending process (upper branch) which remains a consistent height throughout its length. Other pseudosuchians either have a much shorter ascending process (early crocodylomorphs) or one which expands (rauisuchids) or tapers (more basal taxa) towards the rear. The posterior process (lower branch) of the maxilla is even longer, holding at least 15 teeth. Maxillary teeth are serrated and knife-like, with the front edge being significantly convex and the rear side being slightly concave. The posterior process of the maxilla is low and circular in cross-section at the front but deepens and thins towards the rear. This proportional change is unique to Carnufex among loricatans. The posterior process also supports a sharp ridge which terminates at the rear lower corner of the antorbital fenestra.

The antorbital fenestra itself takes the form of a very large and elongated triangular hole. Distinctly, the upper rear corner of the fenestra in Carnufex is situated above the lower rear corner, making the rear edge of the antorbital fenestra vertical rather than slanted forwards as in other early crocodylomorphs. The lacrimal is deeply incised by the antorbital fossa (the basin surrounding the antorbital fenestra). This fossa is rimmed by a rough ridge possessing a small but characteristic forward prong similar to that seen in some theropod dinosaurs. The outer surface of the jugal is also covered with pits and ridges. The anterior process (front portion) of the jugal is tall and unusually smooth and rounded in shape. The jugal's posterior process (rear branch) is bifurcated, with a large and tapering main portion and a smaller triangular branch forking up from it. A bifurcated posterior jugal is present in other early crocodylomorphs as well as dinosaurs, but in the latter group the two portions are equal in size, unlike the case with Carnufex.

The angular is thin and slender, with subtle branched texturing. A pronounced ridge crops out at the outer rear portion of the bone. This ridge likely supports the pterygoideus ventralis muscle, although a similarly distinct ridge is rare among other crocodylomorphs, only known in Junggarsuchus. Otherwise, the angular is similar to that of Sphenosuchus. The articular is generally similar to that of other crocodylomorphs, with a saddle-shaped jaw facet, a deep groove for the chorda tympani nerve, and a small upwards projection at the rear of the bone. It also possesses a medial process (inwards branch) akin to that of earlier pseudosuchians like Postosuchus, although the medial process of Carnufex is a small, conical peak rather than a large projection.

=== Postcranium ===
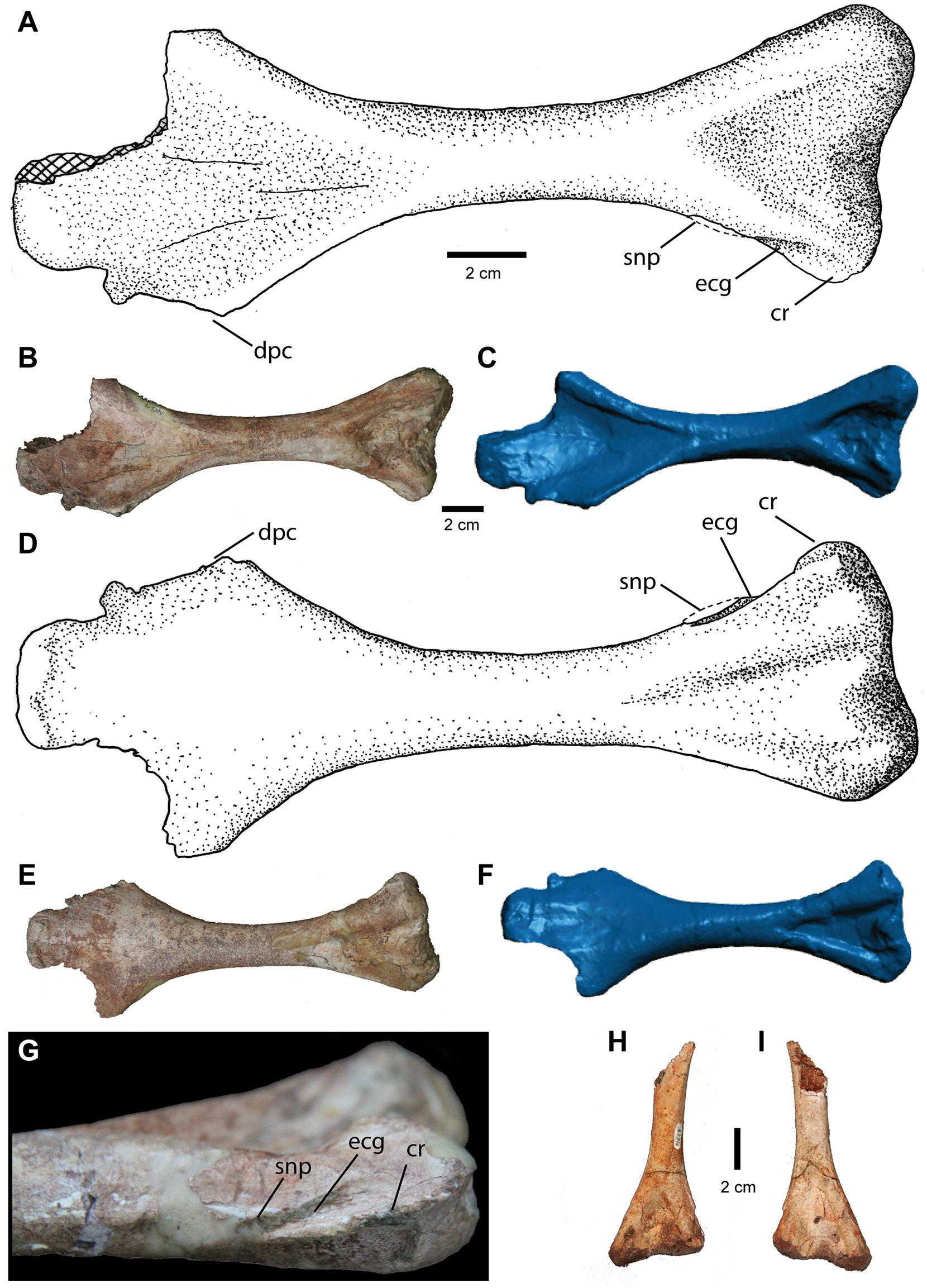
The holotype (A-G) and referred (H-I) humeri of Carnufex

The cervical neural arch is a complex bone adorned with nine laminae (plate-like ridges between various regions) and twelve fossae (deep pits between laminae). The neural spine is tall, rising a short distance before bending backwards at a 30-degree angle. The diapophyses (rib facets) are vertically extended and project laterally, though not very far. The rear edge of the postzygapophyses (rear articular processes) are thin and dip downwards, though they do not converge and instead their bases are separated by a small, U-shaped gap. Various other archosaurs have a similar postzygapophyseal projection, known as a hyposphene, though they differ from Carnufex in that their postzygapophyses converge at the base. Few early pseudosuchians preserve enough of the atlas to properly compare with the crescent-shaped atlantal intercentrum of Carnufex.

The dorsal neural arch is similar to that of the cervical, with a few differences. The diapophyses are much shorter and the zygapophyses are more level. The dorsal is also less complex than the cervical, with only a few laminae and fossae. These include a less prominent "hyposphene", possibly an intermediate stage between reptiles like Postosuchus, which has a prominent hyposphene in its dorsals, and crocodylomorphs, which lack such a structure entirely. The neural spine is slightly expanded anteroposteriorly at its tip, like non-crocodylomorphs, but it does not have a spine table (lateral expansion). An asymmetrical extension visible from the underside of the neural arch may be a pathological feature. Preserved ribs are similar to those of other paracrocodylomorphs.

The humerus was short, with a constricted shaft. It was more similar to Postosuchus than it was to other crocodylomorphs, as a result of several features. These include a distal end approximately three times as wide as the shaft (as opposed to two times as wide), and the presence of an ectepicondylar groove and supinator process (which are not present in other crocodylomorphs). There is also a unique characteristic present in Carnufex but absent in all of its relatives, that being a pronounced crest forming the rear edge of the ectepicondylar groove.

== Classification ==
Carnufex is a primitive crocodylomorph, a group including suchians more derived than Rauisuchidae. According to a phylogenetic analysis by Zanno et al., Carnufex was found to be the most basal crocodylomorph, along with an unnamed genus.

Below is a simplified version of their cladogram, including only Loricata and Crocodylomorpha.

- Loricata
  - Prestosuchus
  - - Saurosuchus
    - - Batrachotomus
      - - Fasolasuchus
        - - Rauisuchidae
          - Crocodylomorpha
            - Carnufex
            - CM 73372
            - - Dromicosuchus
              - Hesperosuchus
              - CM 29894
              - - - Sphenosuchus
                  - Redondavenator
                - - Dibothrosuchus
                  - Terrestrisuchus
                  - - Litargosuchus
                    - - Kayentasuchus
                      - Crocodyliformes

== Paleoecology ==
The Pekin Formation is a Late Triassic deposit in Deep River Basin of North and South Carolina, which dates from the Carnian about 231 million years ago. The formation is the oldest in the Chatham Group. The locality of Carnufex is in a boulder field, and the rock facies suggest that the region once represented a channel or alluvial deposit. In the Carnian, the formation would have been 2º north of the equator. Much of the fauna from the Pekin Formation awaits formal description. The fauna includes a new aetosaur, Carnufex and another crocodylomorph, an unnamed traversodont formerly assigned to Boreogomphodon, and a new dicynodont. Although Carnufex was the largest carnivore in its ecosystem known from fossils, this may be a result of sampling bias obscuring the distribution of larger animals like rauisuchids. As a result, its describers hesitated from identifying Carnufex as the apex predator of its environment, instead proposing that it may be part of a large predator "guild" that inhabited the area.

== Gallery ==
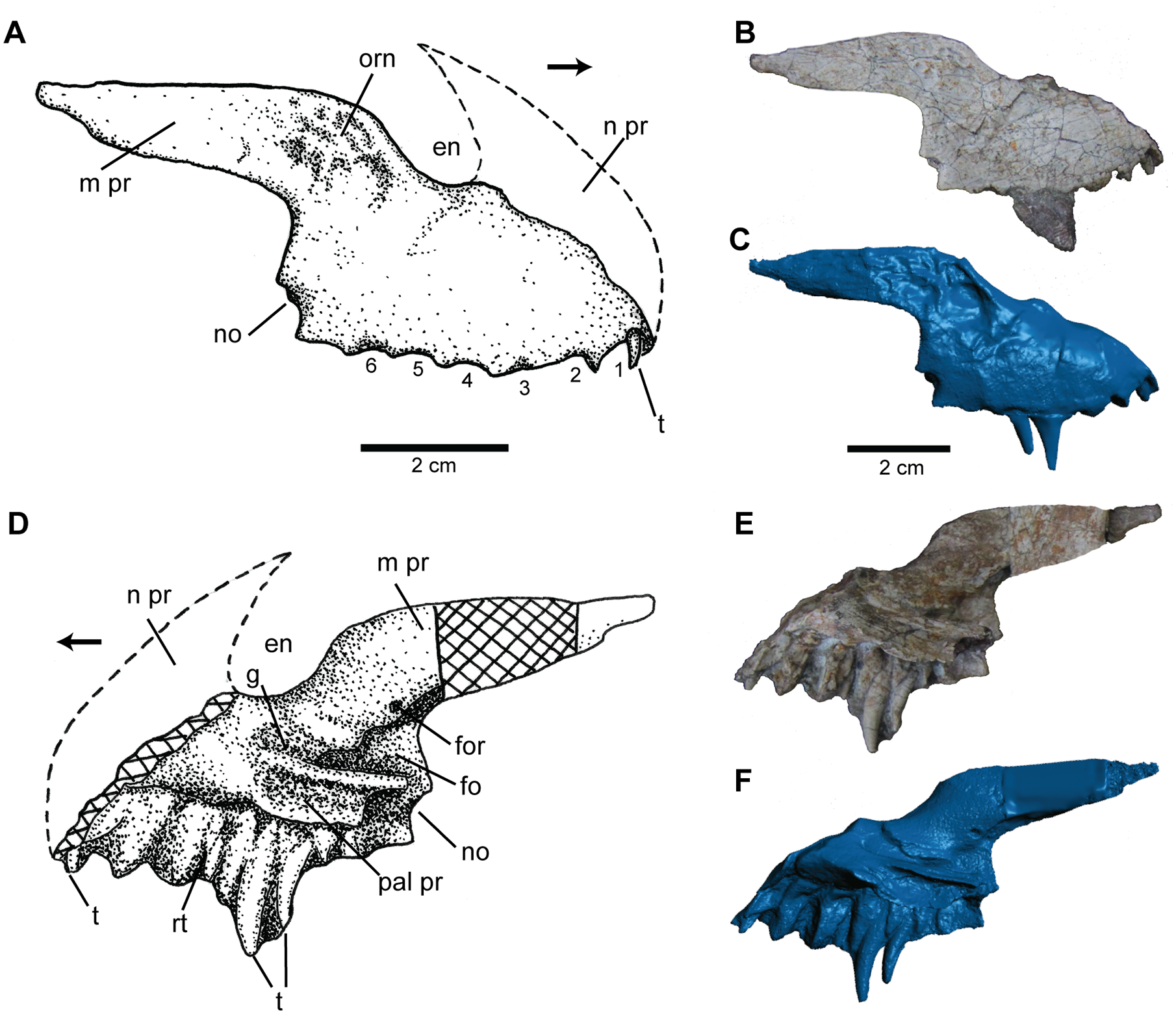
Premaxilla

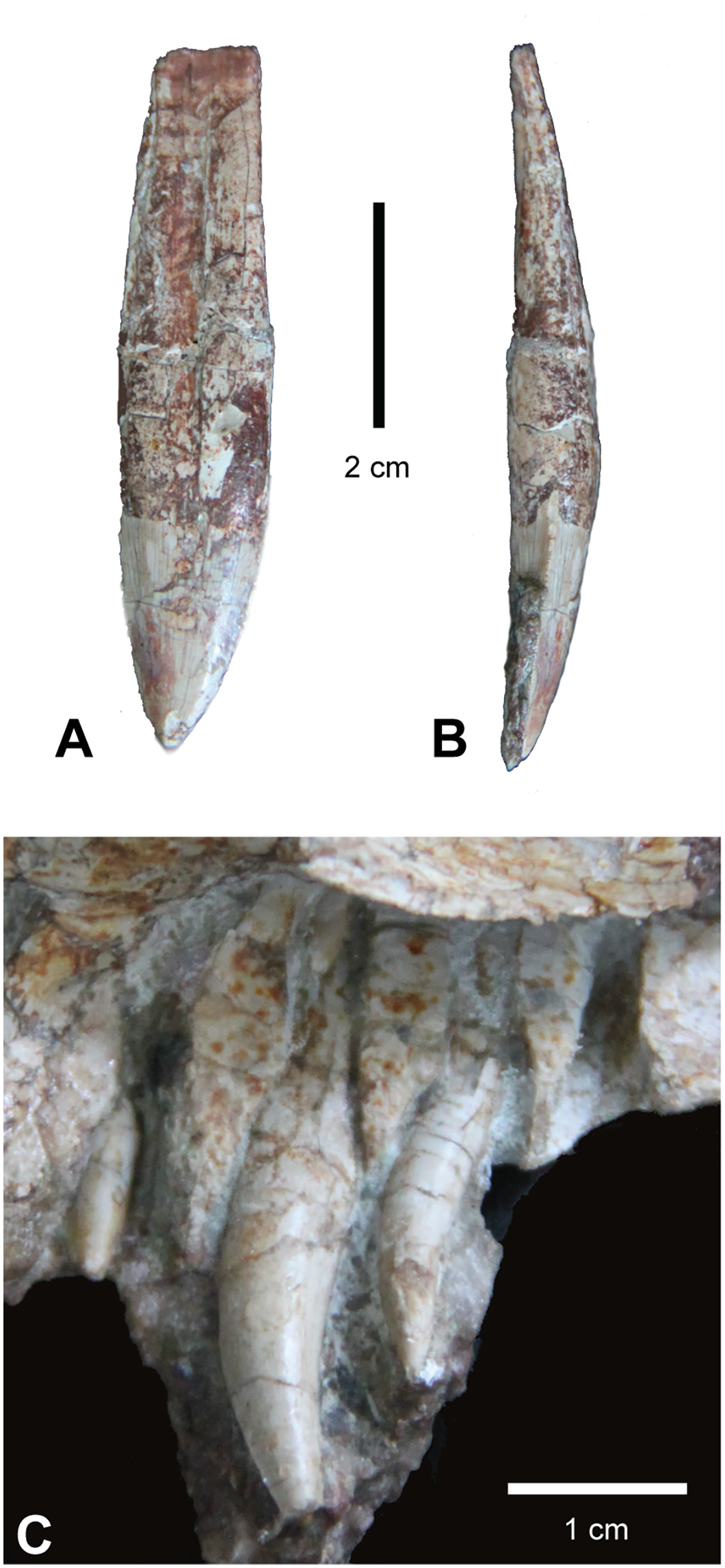
Teeth

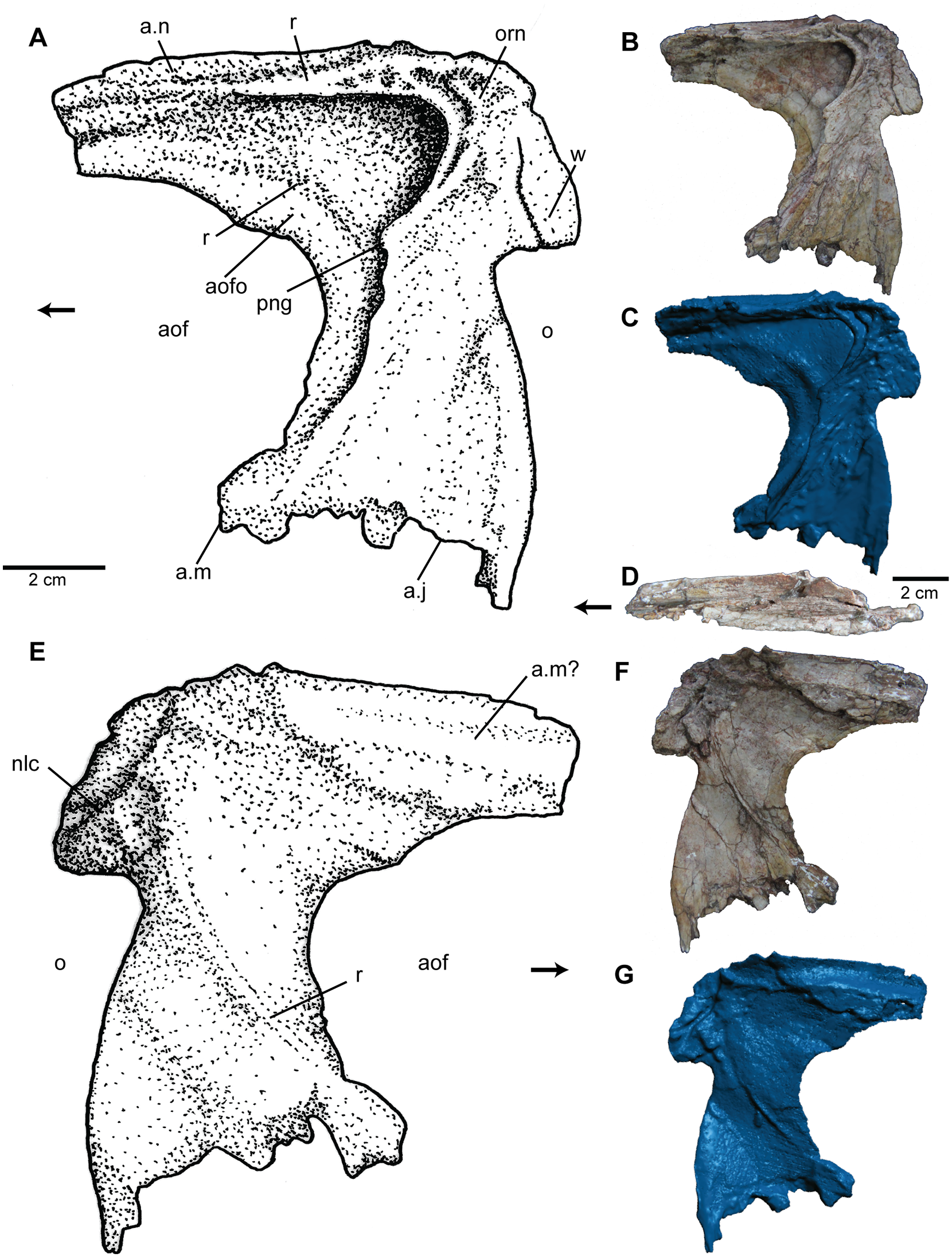
Lacrimal

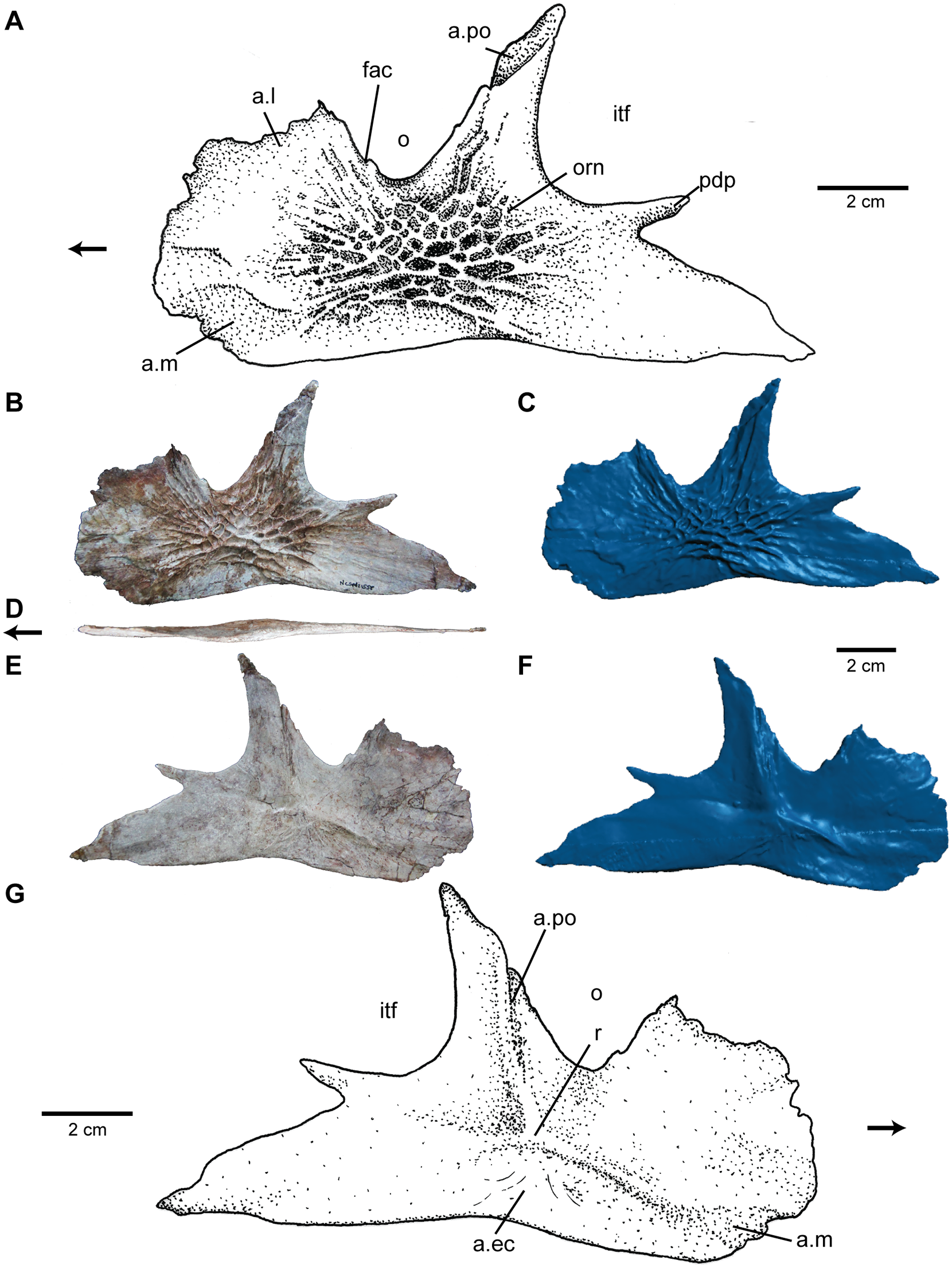
Jugal

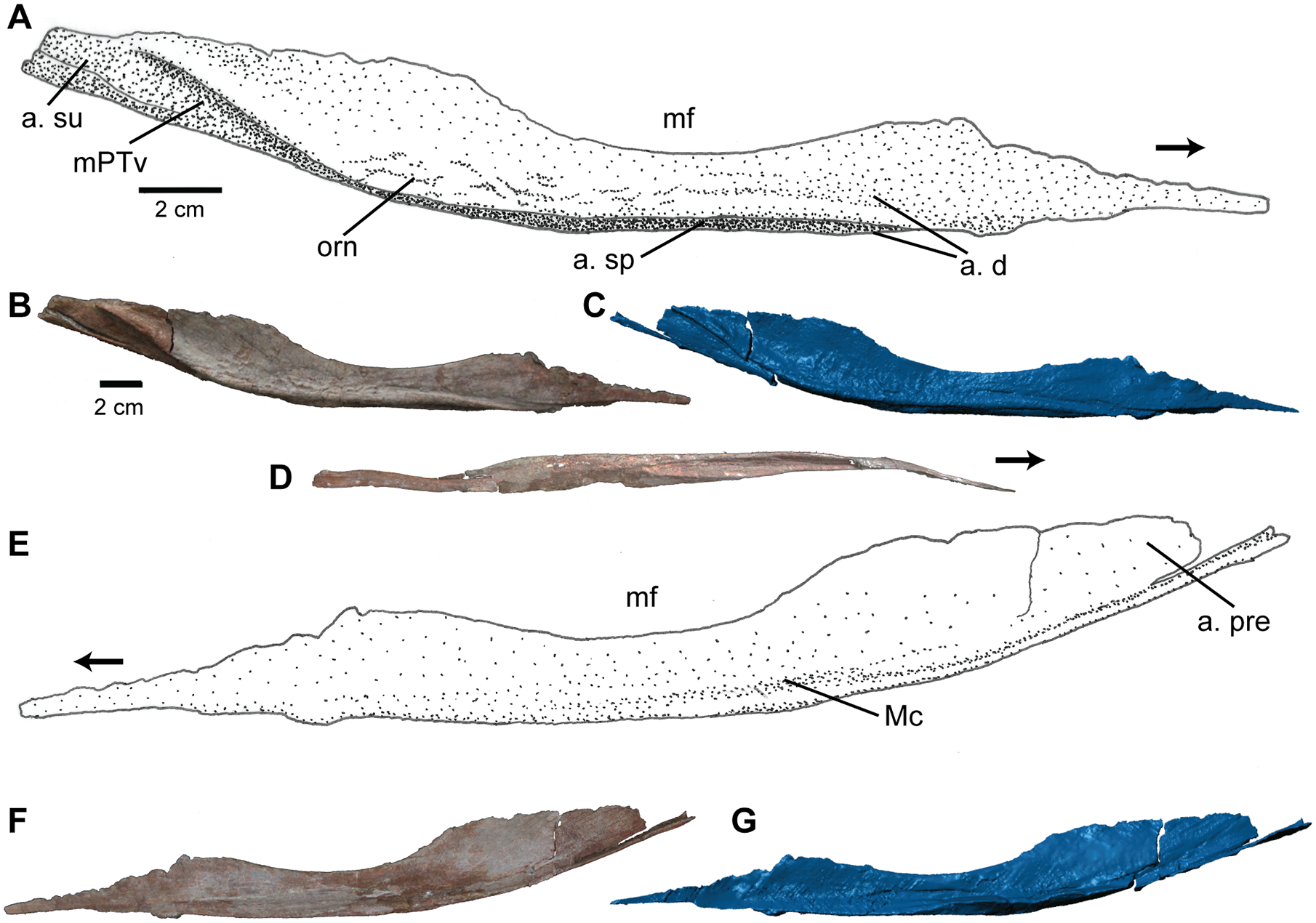
Angular

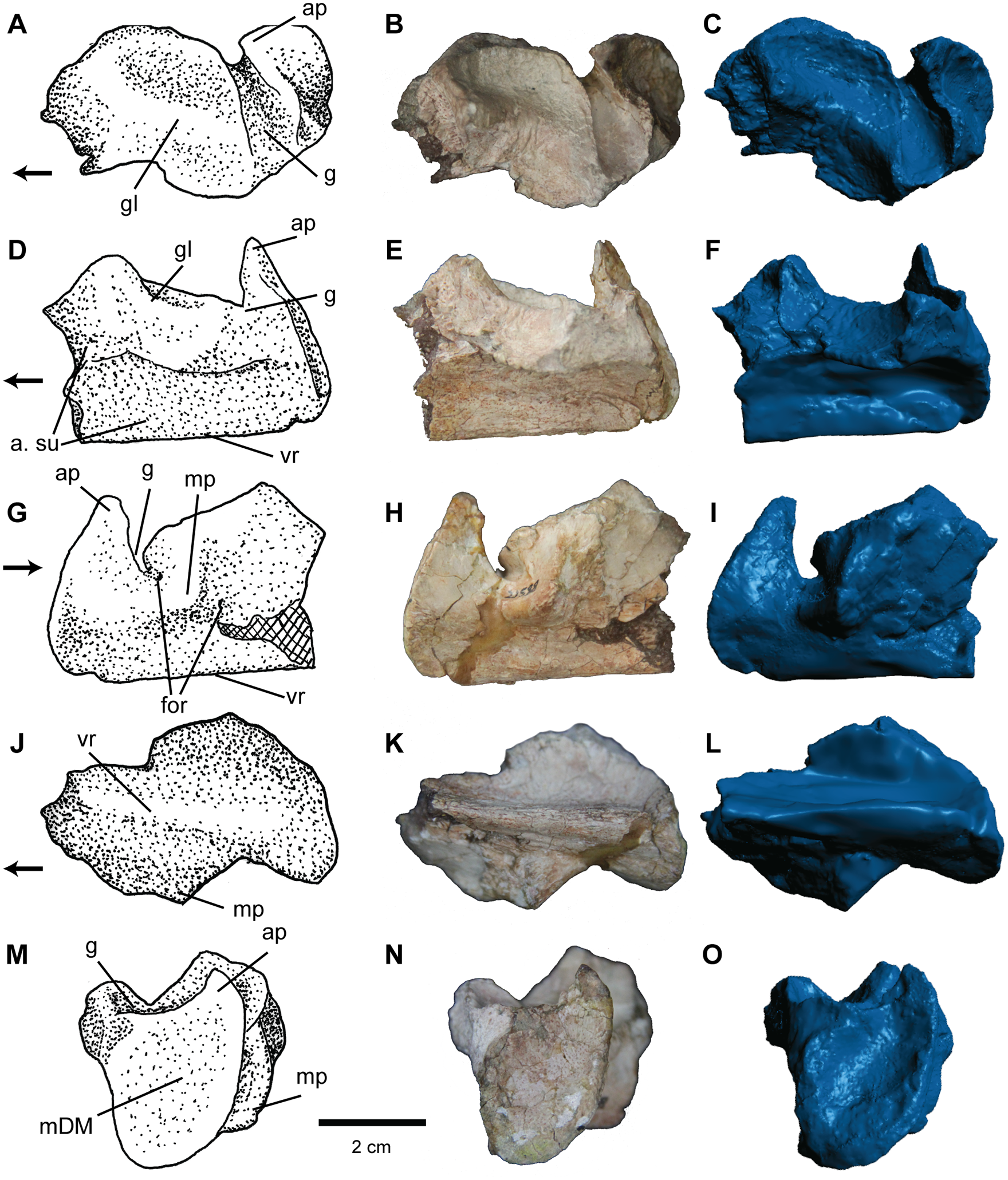
Articular

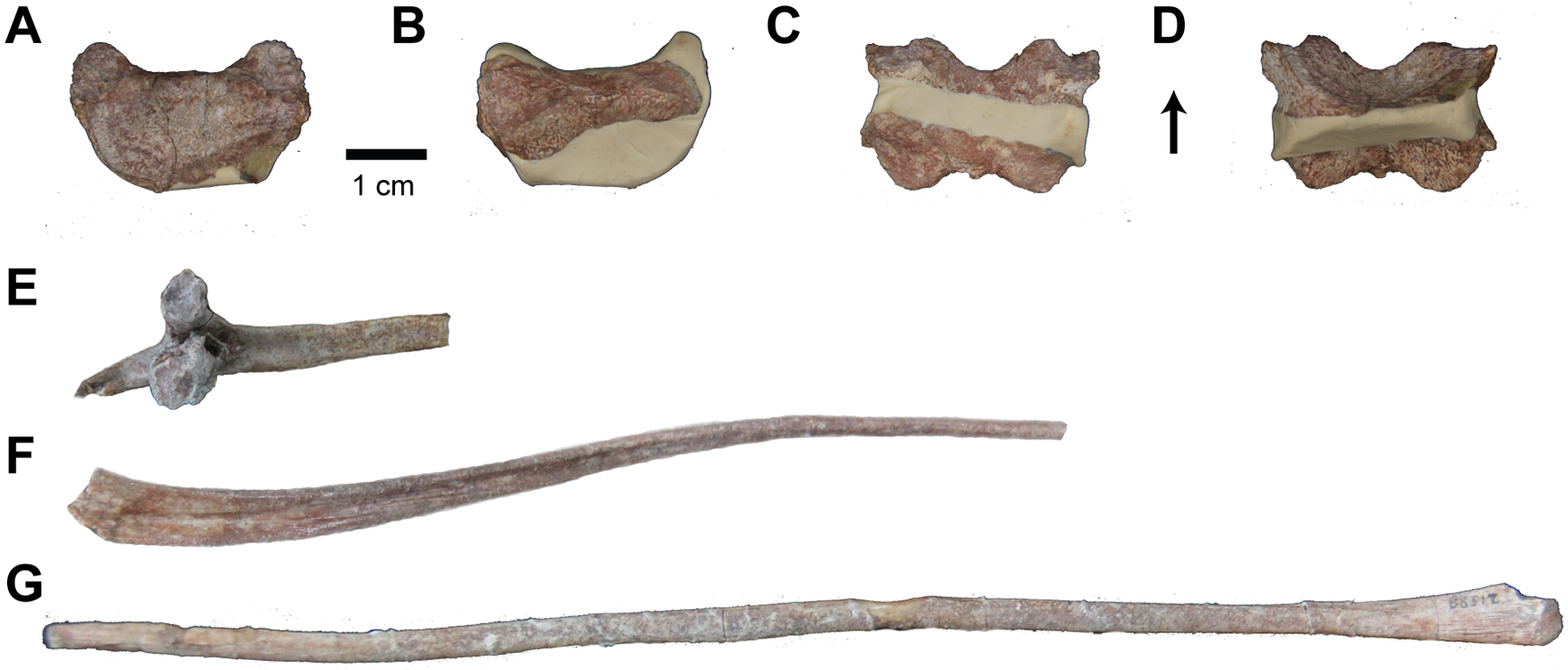
Atlantal intercentrum and ribs

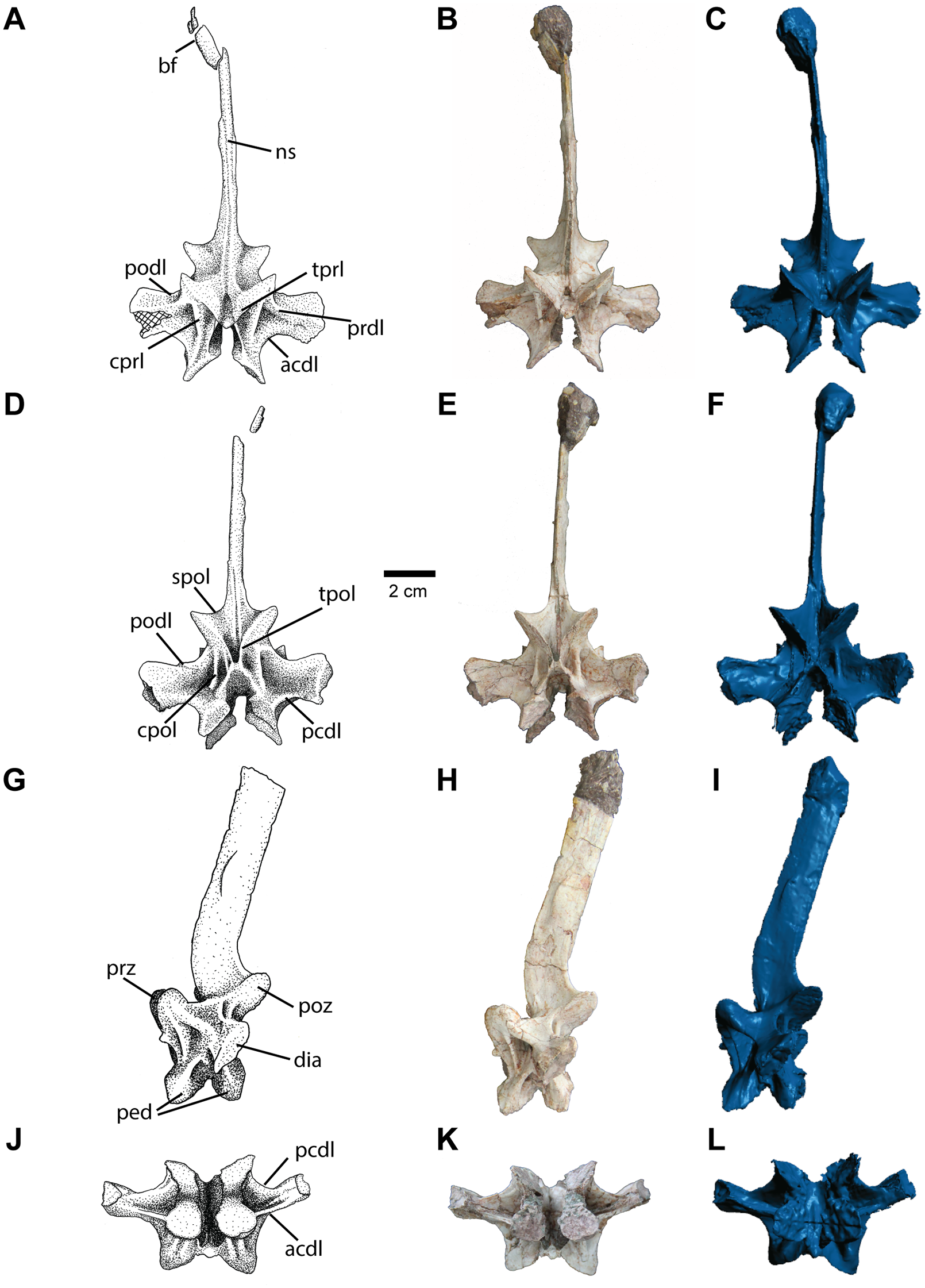
Cervical neural arch

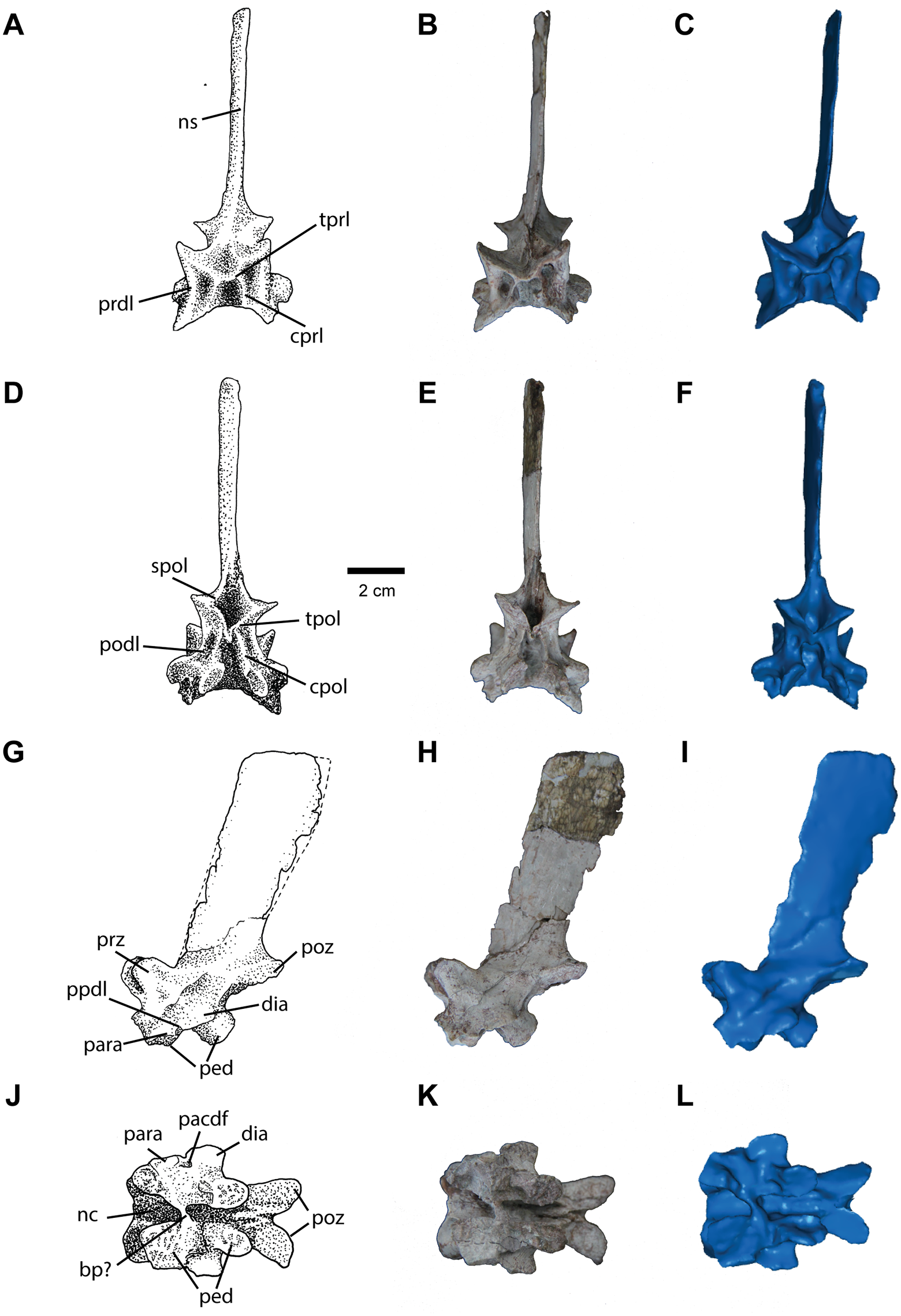
Dorsal neural arch
