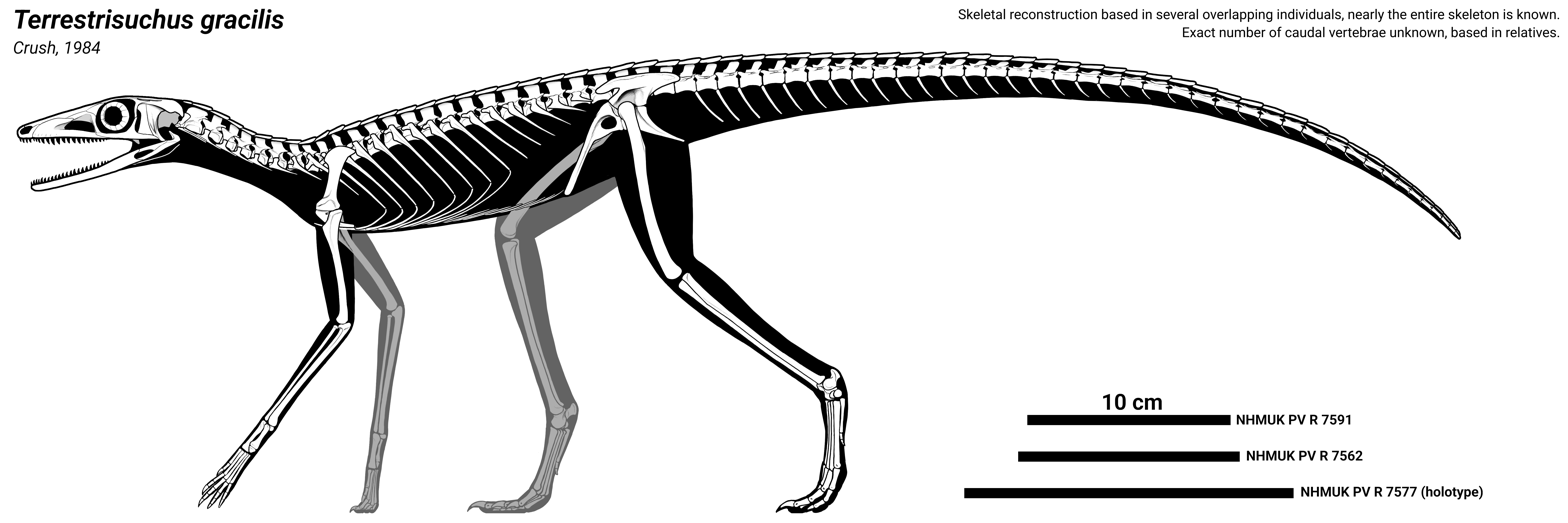
- Skeleton of Terrestrisuchus, a small basal "sphenosuchian" crocodylomorph

Scientific classification
- Kingdom: Animalia
- Phylum: Chordata
- Class: Reptilia
- Clade: Pseudosuchia
- Clade: Paracrocodylomorpha
- Clade: Loricata
- Clade: Crocodylomorpha; Hay, 1930

Type species
- Crocodylus niloticus Laurenti, 1768

Subgroups
- †Carnufex
- †Dianchungosaurus
- †Dibothrosuchus
- †Dromicosuchus
- †Eopneumatosuchus
- †Eosphorosuchus
- †Galahadosuchus (Saltoposuchidae?)
- †Hesperosuchus
- †Kayentasuchus
- †Litargosuchus
- †Pattisaura
- †Pseudhesperosuchus
- †Redondavenator
- †Saltoposuchus (Saltoposuchidae?)
- †Sphenosuchus
- †Terrestrisuchus (Saltoposuchidae?)
- †Trialestes (Trialestidae?)
- Solidocrania Ruebenstahl et al., 2022
  - †Almadasuchus
  - †Hallopus (Hallopodidae?)
  - †Junggarsuchus
  - †Macelognathus
  - †Phyllodontosuchus
  - †Thalattosuchia (relationships uncertain)
  - Crocodyliformes
Crocodylomorpha incertae sedis
- †Artzosuchus
- †Lusitanisuchus
- †Microchampsa
- †Notochampsa (Notochampsidae?)
- †Stegomosuchus
Possible crocodylomorphs
- †Dianchungosaurus
- †Parrishia
- †Rarosaurus
- †Syntomiprosopus

= Crocodylomorpha =

Crocodylomorphs Temporal range: Late Triassic–Present, 235–0 Ma

Clade of reptiles

Crocodylomorpha is a group of pseudosuchian archosaurs that includes the crocodilians and their extinct relatives. They were the only members of Pseudosuchia to survive the end-Triassic extinction. Extinct crocodylomorphs were considerably more ecologically diverse than modern crocodilians. The earliest and most primitive crocodylomorphs are represented by "sphenosuchians", a paraphyletic assemblage containing small-bodied, slender forms with elongated limbs that walked upright, which represents the ancestral morphology of Crocodylomorpha. These forms persisted until the end of the Jurassic. During the Jurassic, crocodylomorphs morphologically diversified into numerous niches, with the subgroups Neosuchia (which includes modern crocodilians) and the extinct Thalattosuchia adapting to aquatic life, while some terrestrial groups adopted herbivorous and omnivorous lifestyles. Terrestrial crocodylomorphs would continue to co-exist alongside aquatic forms until becoming extinct during the Miocene.

== Evolutionary history ==
Life restoration of Hesperosuchus from the Late Triassic (Carnian) of North America, an early branching, so-called "sphenosuchian" crocodylomorph

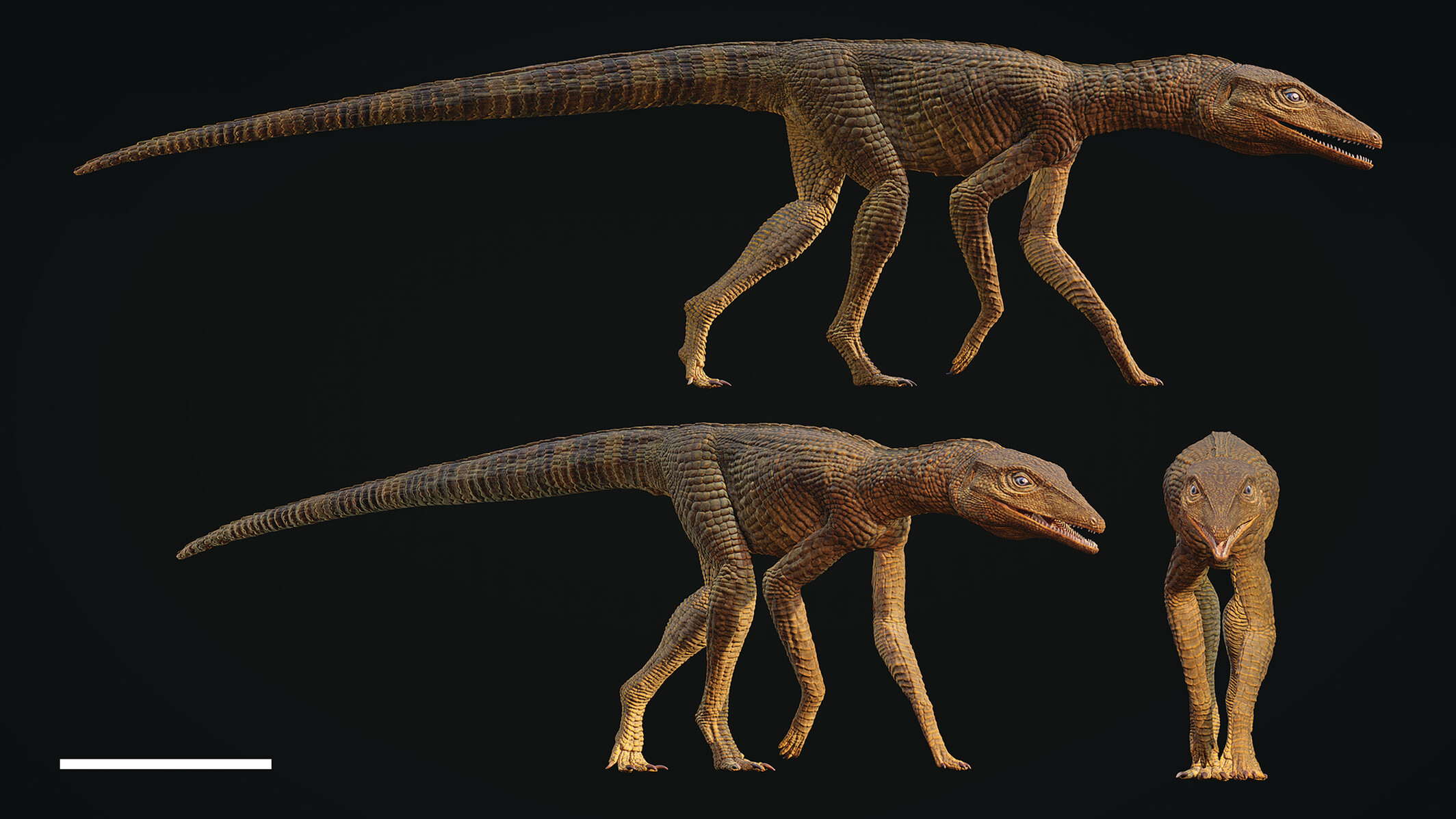
Life restoration of basal crocodylomorph Galahadosuchus.

The earliest lineages of Crocodylomorpha are placed into the paraphyletic "Sphenosuchia", which are characterized by slender bodies with elongate legs. The oldest known crocodylomorph is Trialestes, known from the Late Triassic (Carnian-Norian) of Argentina, around 231–225 million years ago, the last groups of "sphenosuchians" persisted until the end of the Jurassic. During the Jurassic, crocodylomorphs diversified, including the emergence of herbivorous and omnivorous forms, as well as the aquatically adapted Neosuchia and Thalattosuchia, with Thalattosuchia and several groups of neosuchians becoming adapted to a marine lifestyle over the Jurassic and Cretaceous During the Cretaceous, the Notosuchia were a diverse group across the Southern Hemisphere occupying many diverse ecologies. Modern crocodilians, a subgroup of Neosuchia, emerged during the Late Cretaceous. Crocodylomorph diversity was severely reduced by the end-Cretaceous extinction event. The last group of terrestrially adapted crocodylomorphs was the Sebecidae, a group of large predatory notosuchians which persisted in South America until the middle Miocene around 12 million years ago.

== Taxonomy and phylogeny ==
Historically, all known living and extinct crocodiles were indiscriminately lumped into the order Crocodilia. However, beginning in the late 1980s, many scientists began restricting the order Crocodilia to the living species and close extinct relatives such as Mekosuchus. The various other groups that had previously been known as Crocodilia were moved to Crocodylomorpha and the slightly more restrictive Crocodyliformes. Crocodylomorpha has been given the rank of superorder in some 20th and 21st century studies.

The old Crocodilia was subdivided into the suborders:

- Eusuchia: true crocodiles (which includes crown-group Crocodylia)
- Mesosuchia: 'middle' crocodiles
- Thalattosuchia: sea crocodiles
- Protosuchia: first crocodiles
- Sphenosuchia: wedge crocodiles
- Sebecosuchia: Sebecus crocodiles

Mesosuchia is a paraphyletic group as it does not include eusuchians (which nest within Mesosuchia). Mesoeucrocodylia was the name given to the clade that contains mesosuchians and eusuchians (Whetstone and Whybrow, 1983).

The previous definitions of Crocodilia and Eusuchia did not accurately convey evolutionary relationships within the group. The only order-level taxon that is currently considered valid is Crocodilia in its present definition. Prehistoric crocodiles are represented by many taxa, but since few major groups of the ancient forms are distinguishable, a conclusion on how to define new order-level clades is not yet possible. (Benson & Clark, 1988). Crocodylomorpha in the modern sense, as defined by Paul Sereno in 2005, is phylogenetically defined as the most inclusive clade containing Crocodylus niloticus (the Nile crocodile), but not Rauisuchus tiradentes, Poposaurus gracilis, Gracilisuchus stipanicicorum, Prestosuchus chiniquensis, or Aetosaurus ferratus.

=== Phylogeny ===
Below is a cladogram of most known crocodylomorphs from Stephan F. Speikeman in 2023. The modern consensus is that "sphenosuchians" form a paraphyletic assemblage leading towards the more derived Crocodyliformes. The basal crocodylomorph Saltoposuchidae was defined by Speikman, 2023 as the most inclusive clade containing Saltoposuchus connectens, but not Sphenosuchus acutus, Carnufex carolinensis, and Trialestes romeri. The clade Solidocrania was established by Alexander A. Ruebenstahl and colleagues in 2022 to unite crocodyliforms with their closest "sphenosuchian" relatives who both share similarly reinforced skulls. This clade was defined as the least inclusive clade including Junggarsuchus sloani, Almadasuchus figarii, and Macelognathus vagans. The following cladogram was published by Juan Martín Leardi in 2025.

- Crocodylomorpha
  - Carnufex
  - CM 73372
  - Redondavenator
  - - Trialestidae
      - Pseudohesperosuchus
      - Trialestes
    - - Hesperosuchus
      - - Dromicosuchus
        - - Kayentasuchus
          - Saltoposuchus
          - - Terrestrisuchus
            - - Litargosuchus
              - - Sphenosuchus
                - - Hallopus
                  - Dibothrosuchus
                  - Solidocrania
                    - Junggarsuchus
                    - - Macelognathus
                      - - Almadasuchus
                        - - Eopneumatosuchus
                          - Crocodyliformes

Cladogram from Bodenham et al. 2026:

- - Suchia
    - Stagonolepis
    - - Gracilisuchus
      - - Saurosuchus
        - - Postosuchus
          - Crocodylomorpha
            - CM 73372
            - Carnufex
            - Redondavenator
            - Erpetosuchus
            - - - Trialestes
                - Pseudohesperosuchus
              - - Saltoposuchidae
                  - Saltoposuchus
                  - - Litargosuchus
                    - - Terrestrisuchus
                      - Galahadosuchus
                - - - Hesperosuchus
                    - - Dromicosuchus
                      - Kayentasuchus
                  - - Sphenosuchus
                    - - Dibothrosuchus
                      - - Junggarsuchus
                        - - - Almadasuchus
                            - - Macelognathus
                              - Hallopus
                          - Crocodyliformes

== Biology ==
The Crocodylomorpha comprise a variety of forms, shapes, and sizes, which occupied a range of habitats. As with most amniotes, Crocodylomorphs were and are oviparous, laying eggs in a nest or mound, known from strata as old as the Late Jurassic. Adult size varies widely, from about 55 cm long in Knoetschkesuchus to much larger dimensions, as in Sarcosuchus. Most crocodylomorphs were carnivores, but many lineages evolved to be obligate piscivores, such as the extant gharials.

In some forms, like Hesperosuchus and Terrestrisuchus, metatarsal V still had one or two phalanges, but in Crocodyliformes all metatarsal V phalanges have been lost.

== Sources ==
- Benton, M. J. (2004), Vertebrate Palaeontology, 3rd ed. Blackwell Science Ltd
- Hay, O. P. 1930 (1929–1930). Second Bibliography and Catalogue of the Fossil Vertebrata of North America. Carnegie Institution Publications, Washington, 1, 990 pp.
