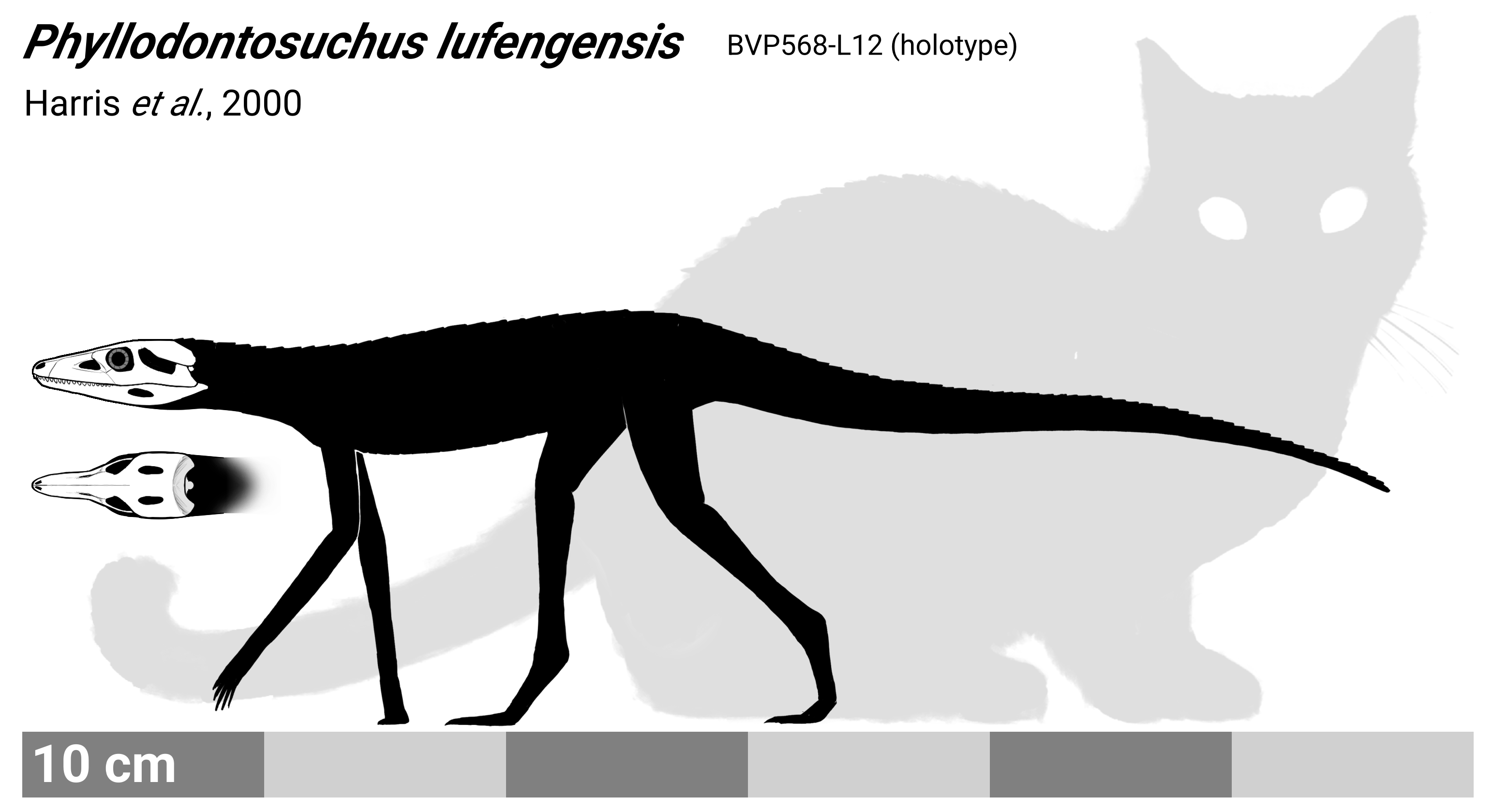
- Size comparison showcasing known remains in white

Scientific classification
- Kingdom: Animalia
- Phylum: Chordata
- Class: Reptilia
- Clade: Archosauria
- Clade: Pseudosuchia
- Clade: Crocodylomorpha
- Genus: †Phyllodontosuchus; Harris et al., 2000
- Species: †P. lufengensis

Binomial name
- †Phyllodontosuchus lufengensis Harris et al., 2000

= Phyllodontosuchus =

Phyllodontosuchus Temporal range: Early Jurassic

Genus of reptiles

Phyllodontosuchus (Ancient Greek, meaning "leaf tooth crocodile", in reference to the shape of the middle and posterior teeth) is a genus of sphenosuchian, a type of basal crocodylomorph, the clade that comprises the crocodilians and their closest kin. It is known from a skull and jaws from Lower Jurassic rocks of Yunnan, China. Phyllodontosuchus is unusual because some of its teeth were leaf-shaped, like those of some herbivorous dinosaurs, and it does not appear to have been a strict carnivore like most other crocodylomorphs.

== History and description ==
Phyllodontosuchus is based on BVP568-L12, a crushed skull and jaws recovered from the Sinemurian-age Dark Red Beds of the Lufeng Formation near Dawa in Yunnan. A Morganucodon skull was also recovered from this locality. BVP568-L12 is only 71.4 millimetres (2.81 in) long and imperfectly preserved; it was first thought to represent an early ornithischian dinosaur. Sutures are not visible, so despite the small size, the specimen appears to have come from an adult. Phyllodontosuchus was named in 2000 by Jerald Harris and colleagues. The type species is P. lufengensis, in reference to the Lufeng Formation.

There were 17 or 18 teeth per side in the upper jaw,^{*} which differed in shape depending on where they were in the jaw (heterodonty). The first five or six were pointed, conical, and curved backward. The following twelve were leaf- or spade-shaped, with fine crenelations on the trailing edge. These are similar to the teeth of some prosauropods and early ornithischians, but differ in important features. For example, the teeth lacked the swellings and ridges seen in the teeth of early ornithischians like Lesothosaurus, and the coarse denticles (smaller points) of leaf-shaped ornithischian and prosauropod teeth in general. Phyllodontosuchus also lacked a predentary as found in all known ornithischians. Instead, it is most similar to sphenosuchians.

Heterodonty is known in several sphenosuchians, including Dibothrosuchus, Hesperosuchus, Pedeticosaurus, and Sphenosuchus. These forms had similar divisions of pointed and recurved anterior teeth and less pointed middle and posterior teeth, which could have been the ancestral state for the leaf-shaped teeth of Phyllodontosuchus. Small heterodont crocodylomorphs are known from other lineages as well, including Edentosuchus, Chimaerasuchus, and Malawisuchus. These small, variably-toothed crocodylomorphs are thought to have had diets beyond the typical carnivory/piscivory of modern crocodilians, possibly including some degree of herbivory. If Phyllodontosuchus did eat plants, it probably did not grind them in the jaws, though.

== Notes ==
^ * The tooth count in the abstract and diagnosis is 6 conical teeth and 12 leaf-shaped teeth, while the body of the paper describes a total of 17 teeth per side, ?5 of which are conical.
