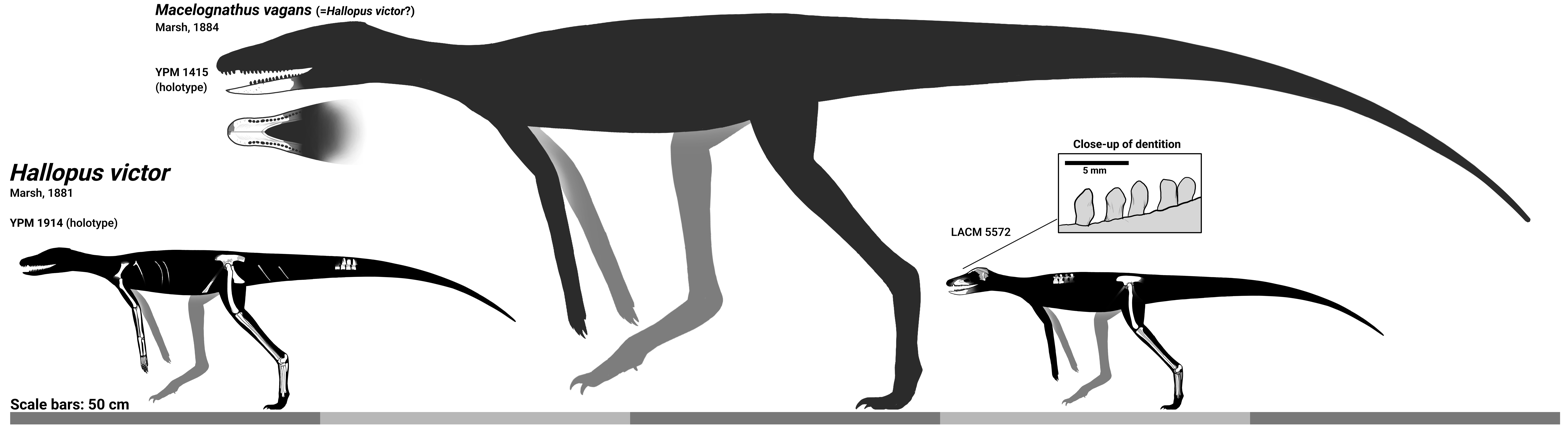
- Skeletal reconstruction of Hallopus victor and Macelognathus vagans, the latter possibly being a junior synonym of the former
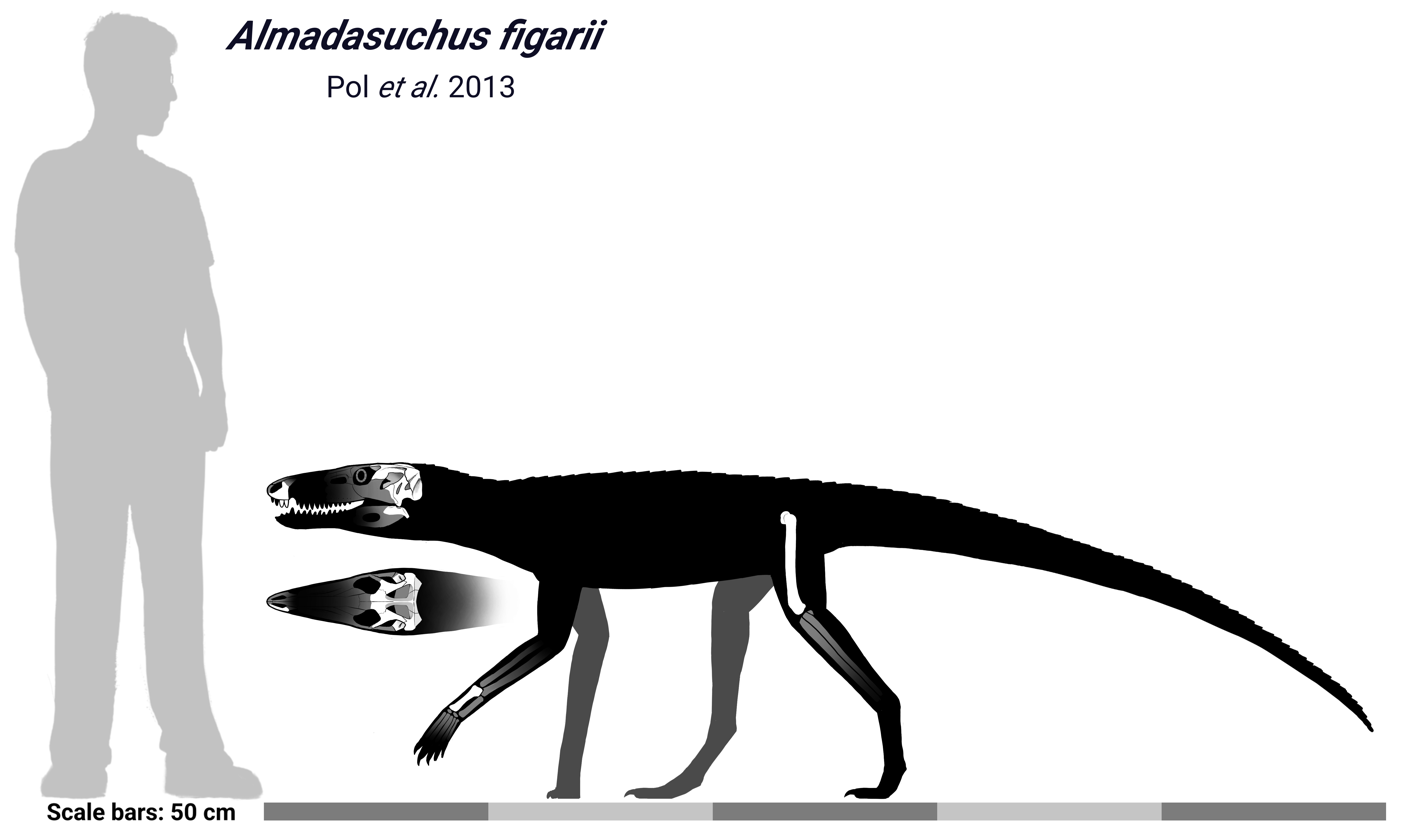
- Skeletal reconstruction of Almadasuchus figarii

Scientific classification
- Kingdom: Animalia
- Phylum: Chordata
- Class: Reptilia
- Clade: Pseudosuchia
- Clade: Crocodylomorpha
- Family: †Hallopodidae; Marsh, 1881

Genera
- †Almadasuchus; †Hallopus; †Macelognathus

= Hallopodidae =

Hallopodidae Temporal range: Late Jurassic

Extinct family of reptiles

Hallopodidae is a family of Late Jurassic crocodylomorphs. It was defined by Juan Leardi and colleagues in 2017 as all taxa more closely related to Hallopus victor than to Protosuchus richardsoni or to Dibothrosuchus elaphros. They have been recovered as the closest relatives of the Crocodyliformes.
