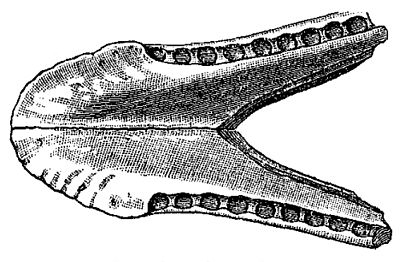
- Jaw of Macelognathus vagans
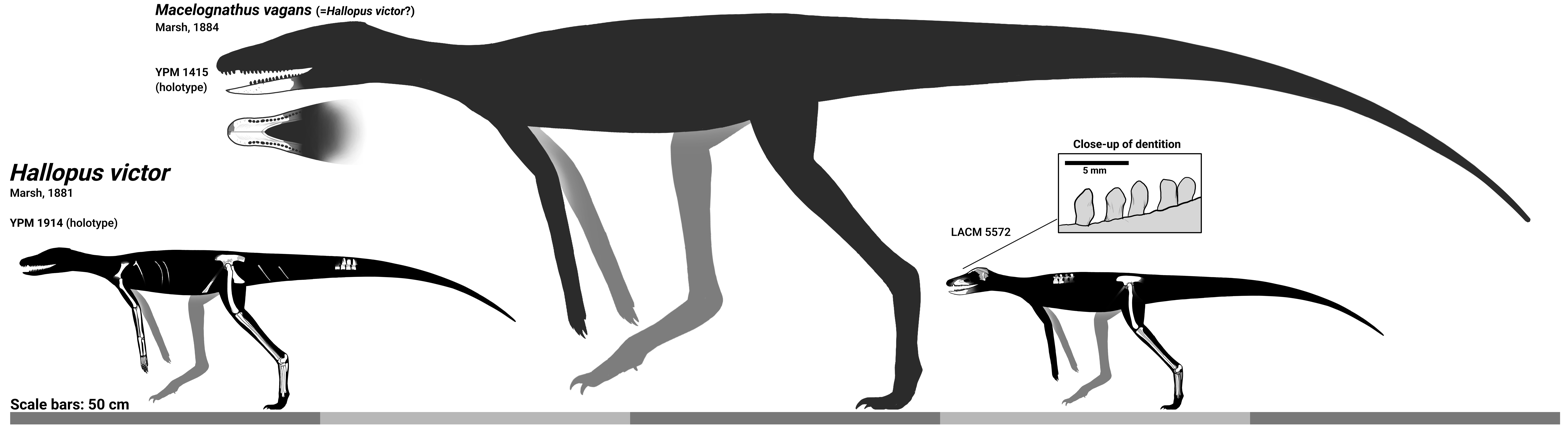
- Skeletal reconstruction of Hallopus victor and Macelognathus vagans, the latter possibly being a junior synonym of the former

Scientific classification
- Kingdom: Animalia
- Phylum: Chordata
- Class: Reptilia
- Clade: Pseudosuchia
- Clade: Crocodylomorpha
- Family: †Hallopodidae
- Genus: †Macelognathus; Marsh, 1884

Type species
- †Macelognathus vagans Marsh, 1884

= Macelognathus =

Macelognathus Temporal range: Late Jurassic, 156.3–146.8 Ma

Extinct genus of reptiles

Macelognathus is an extinct genus of sphenosuchian crocodylomorph from the Late Jurassic. Originally it was believed be a turtle and later a dinosaur. It lived in what is now Wyoming, in North America.

The type species, Macelognathus vagans, was described by Othniel Charles Marsh in 1884 as a turtle based on a partial jaw from the Late Jurassic Morrison Formation at Como Bluff, Wyoming. After being referred to the Dinosauria by Moodie in 1908, it was later reclassified by Ostrom in 1971 as a crocodilian relative. Based on new material from the Morrison Formation at Fruita, Colorado, in 2005 Göhlich et al. identified it as a basal crocodylomorph ("sphenosuchian"). It is considered an example of convergent evolution, due to the similarities to caenagnathid dinosaurs, with which it was not closely related.

It is possibly a junior synonym of Hallopus victor, since the known specimens of both taxa cannot currently be anatomically distinguished from each other, other than the much larger size of the holotype individual of Macelognathus.

Due to a lack of osteological correlates for it, Macelognathus likely didn't have a horny covering (keratinous beak) on its lower jaw. Teeth were slightly recurved and labiolingually compressed. While maxillary teeth were serrated along the distal margin, none of dentary teeth were serrated.
