= Hesperosuchus =

Hesperosuchus Temporal range: Late Triassic, 220 Ma
- Hesperosuchus agilis

Scientific classification
- Kingdom: Animalia
- Phylum: Chordata
- Class: Reptilia
- Clade: Pseudosuchia
- Clade: Crocodylomorpha
- Genus: †Hesperosuchus; Colbert, 1952
- Species: †H. agilis

Binomial name
- †Hesperosuchus agilis Colbert, 1952

Extinct genus of reptiles

Hesperosuchus is an extinct genus of crocodylomorph reptile that contains a single species, Hesperosuchus agilis. Remains of this pseudosuchian have been found in Late Triassic (Carnian) strata from Arizona and New Mexico. Because of similarities in skull and neck anatomy and the presence of hollow bones, Hesperosuchus was formerly thought to be an ancestor of later carnosaurian dinosaurs, but based on more recent findings and research it is now known to be more closely related to crocodilians rather than dinosaurs.

== Discovery and specimens ==
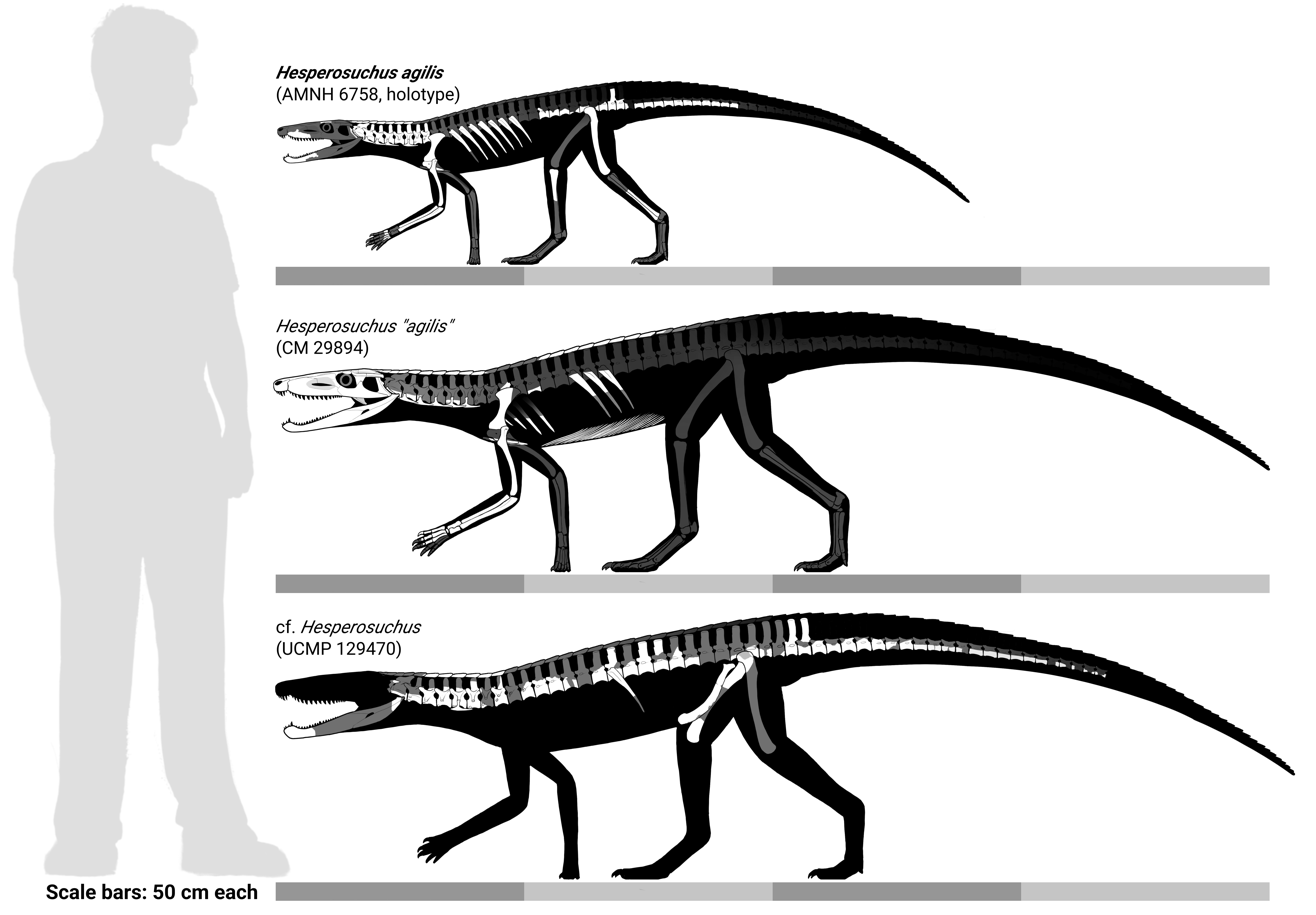
Specimen guide and size comparison of the holotype, and other previously referred specimens

Hesperosuchus was discovered in upper Triassic rocks of Northern Arizona by Llewellyn I. Price, William B. Hayden, and Barnum Brown in the fall of 1929 and the summer of 1930. The specimen was then taken to a museum for Otto Falkenbach to carefully and precisely put together. Many different illustrations of the bones were done by Sydney Prentice from the Carnegie Museum of Pittsburgh. In addition, models and figures were also made by John LeGrand Lois Darling from the Museum Illustrators Corps.

The specimen comes from the lower part of the Petrified Forest member of the Chinle formation, in an area 6 miles (9.7 km) southeast of Cameron, Arizona, close to the old Tanner Crossing of the Little Colorado River. This site preserves an abundance of Triassic vertebrates.

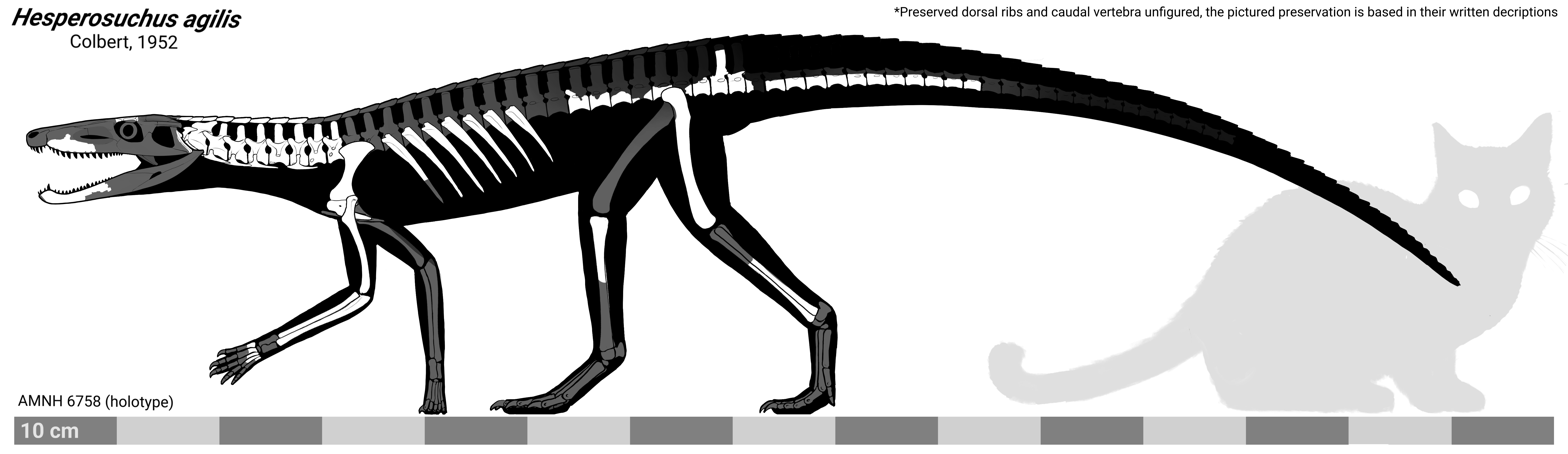
Skeletal reconstruction of the holotype of Hesperosuchus

The holotype (AMNH 6758) comprised parts of the skull (a maxilla previously thought to contain part of the premaxilla, a frontal, quadrate, basioccipital), lower jaw, a complete series of cervical (neck) vertebrae, most of a forelimb, pectoral girdle, several partial dorsal (back) and caudal (tail) vertebrae, a femur, two partial tibia, a partial fibula, cervical and dorsal ribs, and osteoderms. One "problematic bone" could not be identified by Colbert due to its shape, but later turned out to be a coracoid. Elongated metatarsals were described with this specimen, but these were found to belong to a dinosauromorph, along one of the humeri.

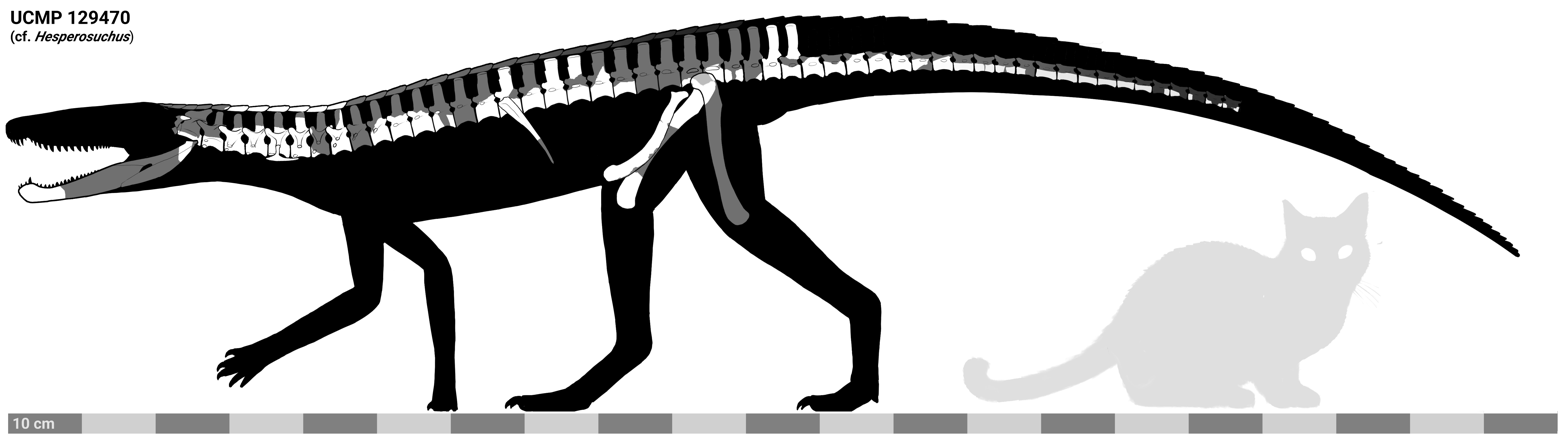
Skeletal reconstruction of UCMP 129470

A crocodylomorph skeleton (UCMP 129470) was found in the upper part of the Chinle formation's Petrified Forest Member, comprising a partial lower jaw, femur, both pubes, osteoderms, and most of the vertebral column. It was first assigned as "cf. Sphenosuchus sp." but later referred to Hesperosuchus after comparisons of the dentary and armor. The specimen is considerably bigger, and possesses a deeper mandible.

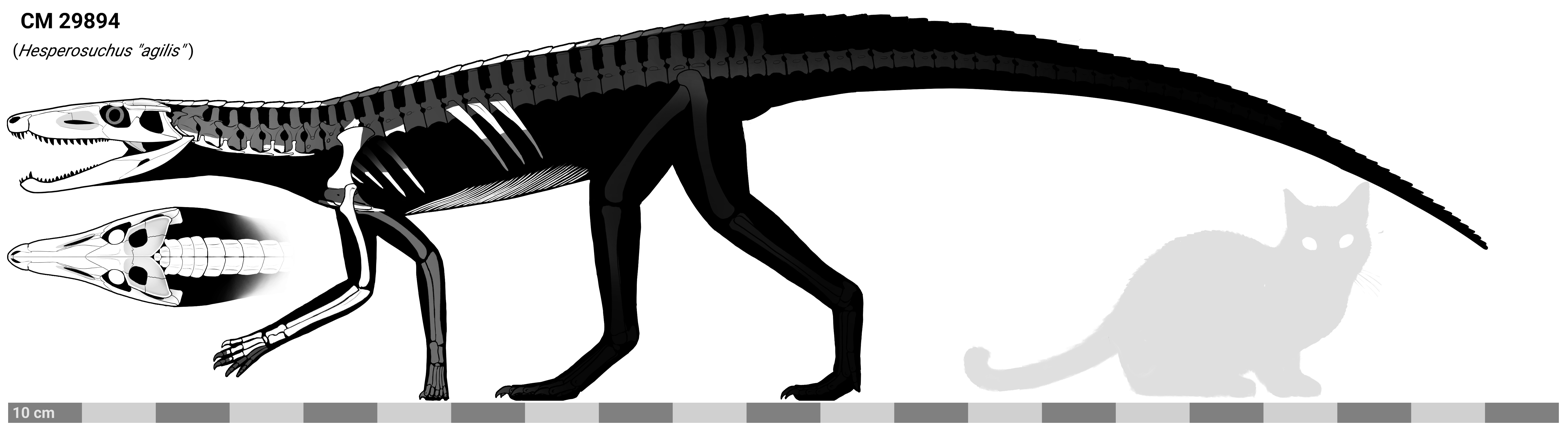
Skeletal reconstruction of CM 29894

In 2001, a new specimen (CM 29894) referred to H. agilis was described from the upper part of the Petrified ForestMember at the Ghost Ranch fossil site, in rocks from the Chinle formation. It preserves a remarkably complete (albeit flattened) skull, several articulated osteoderms, a partial shoulder girdle, an almost complete forelimb, cervical and dorsal ribs, gastralia, and vertebrae (although most of them are obscured by matrix and overlying bone). It is bigger than the holotype of Hesperosuchus (a 13.8 cm (5.4 in) long humerus compared to a 9.4 cm (3.7 in) one, for example).

The referral of these specimens to H. agilis has been doubted, considering the temporal disparity between them (of at least 20 million years), and the consistent morphology of basal crocodylomorphs throughout time, making differentiation between species difficult without complete skeletons. Therefore, it is unlikely they represent the same taxon as the holotype of Hesperosuchus.

== Description ==
=== Stance and limbs ===
Hesperosuchus was relatively small, quadrupedal animal with erect limbs, and a digitigrade stance on both hands and feet, similar to other basal crocodylomorphs like Pseudhesperosuchus or Terrestrisuchus. The hind limbs of Hesperosuchus are large and strong, while the forelimbs were smaller and more slender. Although facultative bipedality is not outside the realms of possibility, the conclusion that it was a primarily bipedal animal was made with the much larger, misidentified dinosauromorph metatarsals alongside the holotype, and the omission of the enlarged wrist bones of crocodylomorphs in Colbert's original reconstruction. Hesperosuchus had five fingers on its forelimbs, and presumably the same on its hindlimbs. The caudal vertebrae were robust, and the tail likely served as counterbaIance. This, coupled with its long, gracile limbs and overall light weight, made Hesperosuchus very quick and able to move rapidly. This advantage of speed allowed for it to catch small prey and escape from larger predators.

=== Skull ===
The skull in the holotype is fragmentary, but enough is preserved to get an idea of its shape. It was tall and narrow, more closely resembling the skulls of theropod dinosaurs than modern crocodilians. The teeth were of lanceolate shape, and serrated on both the front and back edges; these varied in size throughout the mouth. The front of the lower jaw (dentary) was vertically expanded, with the first four teeth being higher than the rest behind them, and the fourth tooth was enlarged, likely an homologous feature with more derived crocodyliforms (including those of modern crocodilians).

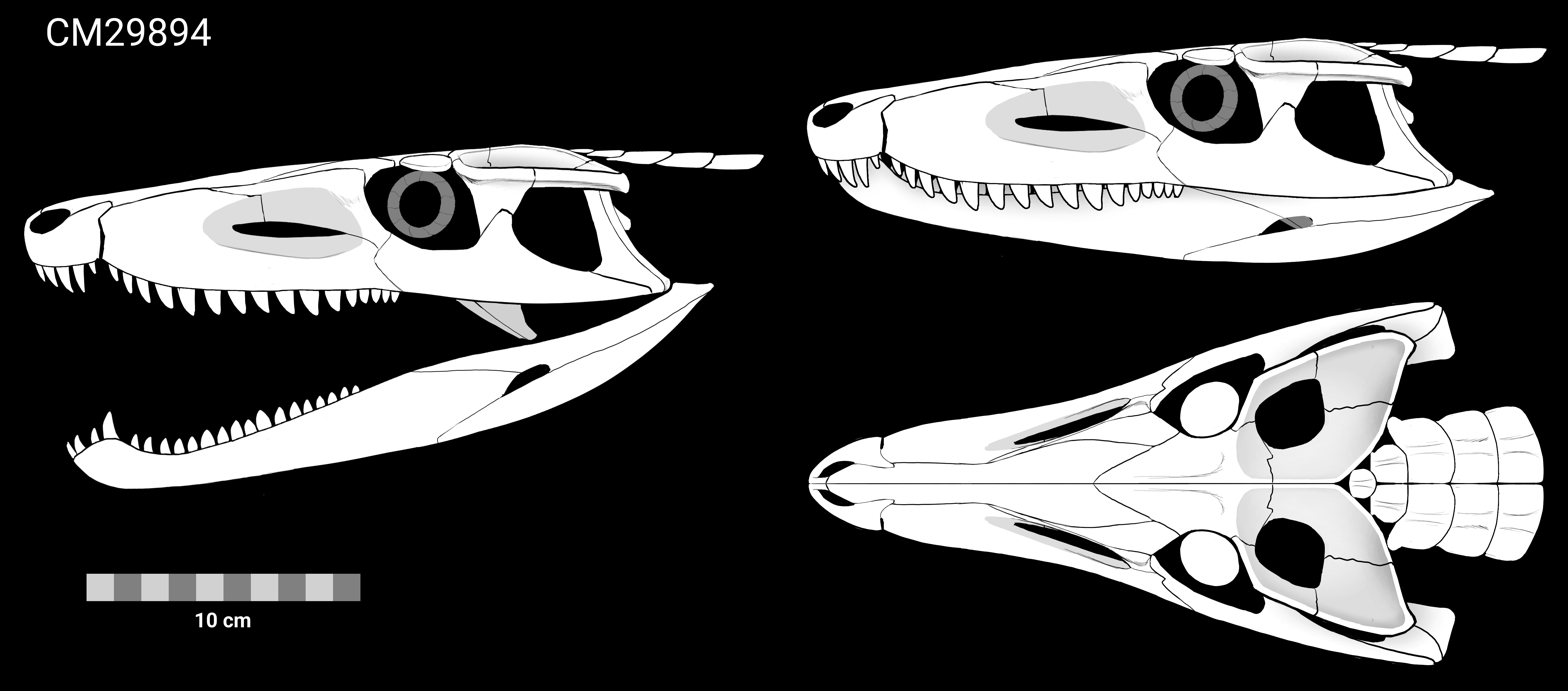
Skull diagram of CM 29894

CM 29894 (which, as explained above, might not belong to H. agilis) consists of a well preserved, complete, roughly triangular skull; showcasing a wide posterior half that tapers into a narrower snout. While the specimen is flattened, it is noticeable that the skull was relatively altirostral, with nearly vertical maxillary walls. it preserves 5 teeth in the premaxilla, and 16 in the maxilla. The expansion at the front of the dentary and the enlarged 4th tooth are evident, but the number of teeth in the lower jaw is unknown due to the occlusion of the upper skull in the specimen. The skull roof was posteriorly wide, with broad lateral expansions of the postorbital and squamosal bones like other crocodylomorphs. The antorbital fenestra was reduced, and housed in a larger, shallow depression on the sides of the skull called the antorbital fossa.

This specimen preserves two circular palpebral bones on top of each orbit. Unlike earlier relatives like Postosuchus, the palpebrals in CM 29894 weren't tightly sutured to the surrounding bones of the skull roof. The presence of said bone is very likely in other crocodylomorph relatives, but remains unconfirmed.

=== Soft tissue reconstruction ===
Ziphodont dentition and theropod-like pattern of linearly arranged jaw foramina of Hesperosuchus suggest a possible existence of lips that protected its teeth from the outside.

=== Osteoderms ===
Like most pseudosuchians and basal crurotarsans, Hesperosuchus had two paired rows of osteoderms along its back, with each roughly square osteoderm overlapping the one behind it. These possessed a straight, raised keel on its dorsal surface. In CM 29894 the first osteoderm was small, circular and unpaired, positioned behind the tip of the V-shaped occipital margin of the skull. The rest of the armor came in pairs, and increased in size along the neck until reaching an arrangement of one-pair-per-vertebra throughout the rest of the body, like many other armoured archosauriforms.

== Paleoecology ==
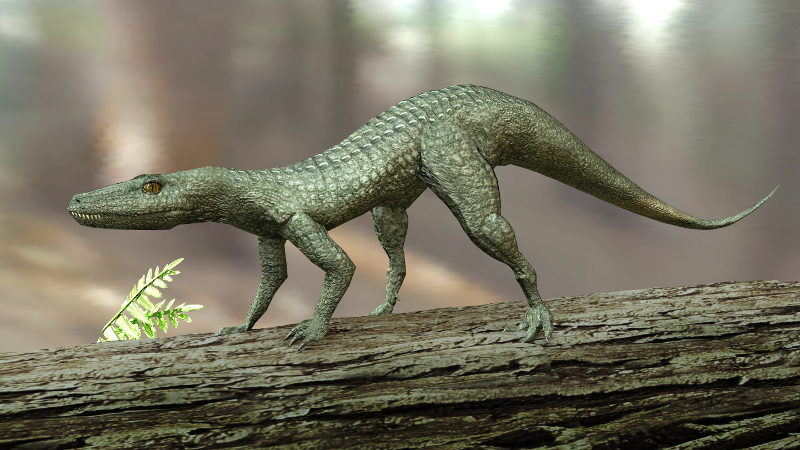
Restoration

Hesperosuchus was a terrestrial animal, where its speed and ability to run fast is the most advantageous as a fitness trait. Northern Arizona's landscape during the Triassic period was surrounded by numerous bodies of water like lakes and streams. This supports that Hesperosuchus likely lived close to water although being a full on land-dwelling animal. The ganoid scales found in the general area where Hesperosuchus was found belong to freshwater fish of the Triassic period, belonging to the genus Semionotus or Lepidotes, which lived in shallow lakes and streams. The phytosaur teeth and small stereospondyl vertebrae found near Hesperosuchus support the presence of lakes or streams crossing a flood plain. Also the many small teeth found, of which some belong to amphibians of the Triassic period, supports the occupying of near water habitats.

Hesperosuchus was a contemporary of Coelophysis, a primitive predatory theropod dinosaur. Coelophysis was long thought to have been a cannibal, based on the presence of putative juvenile Coelophysis bones in the gut regions of a few adults. However, in some of these cases, it was later found that the "juvenile Coelophysis" bones were actually those of a Hesperosuchus (or something very similar) instead.

== See also ==
- Pseudosuchia
- Ornithosuchia
- Crocodilia
- Archosauria
- Triassic
- Sphenosuchia
- Euparkeria
