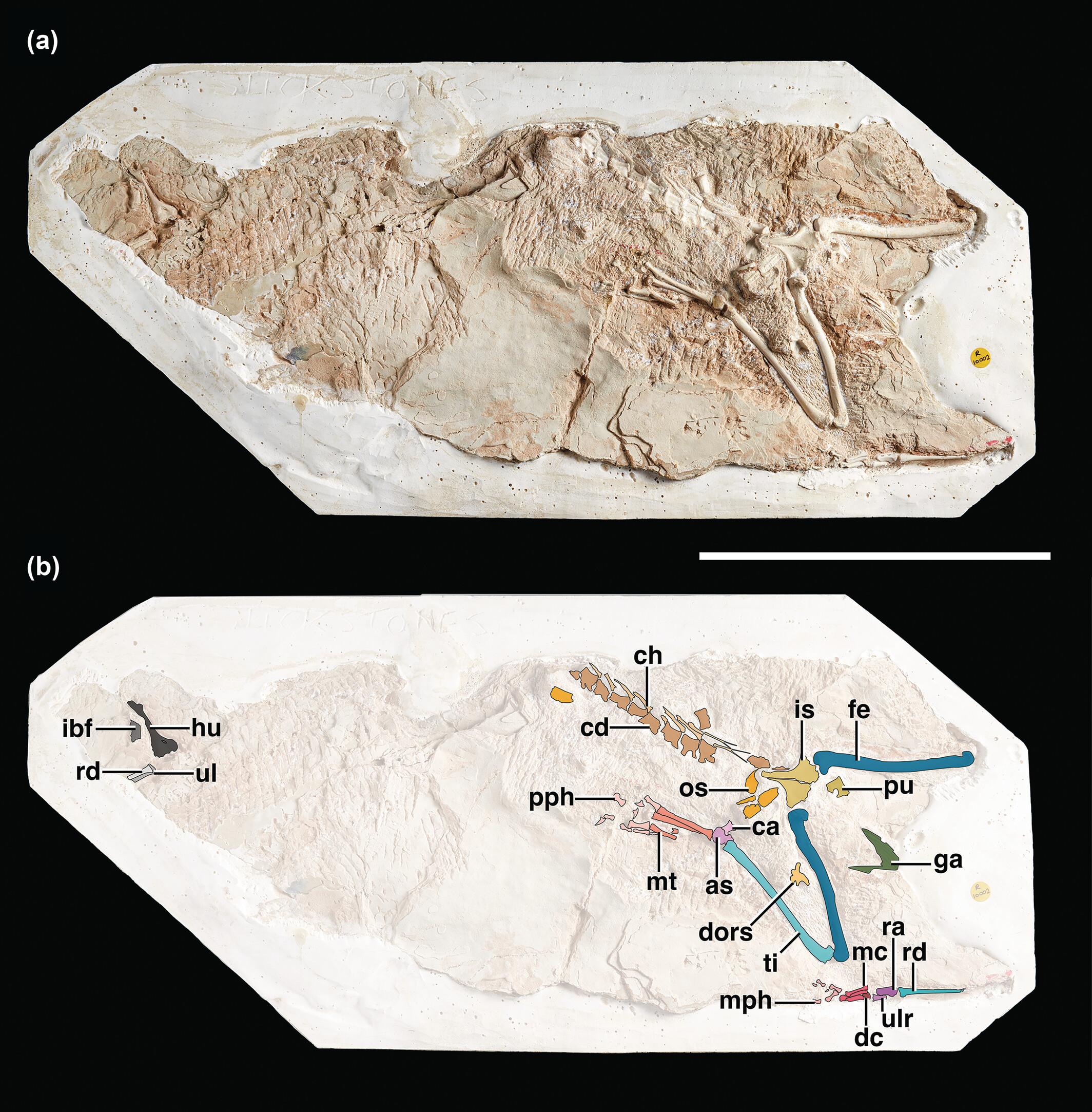

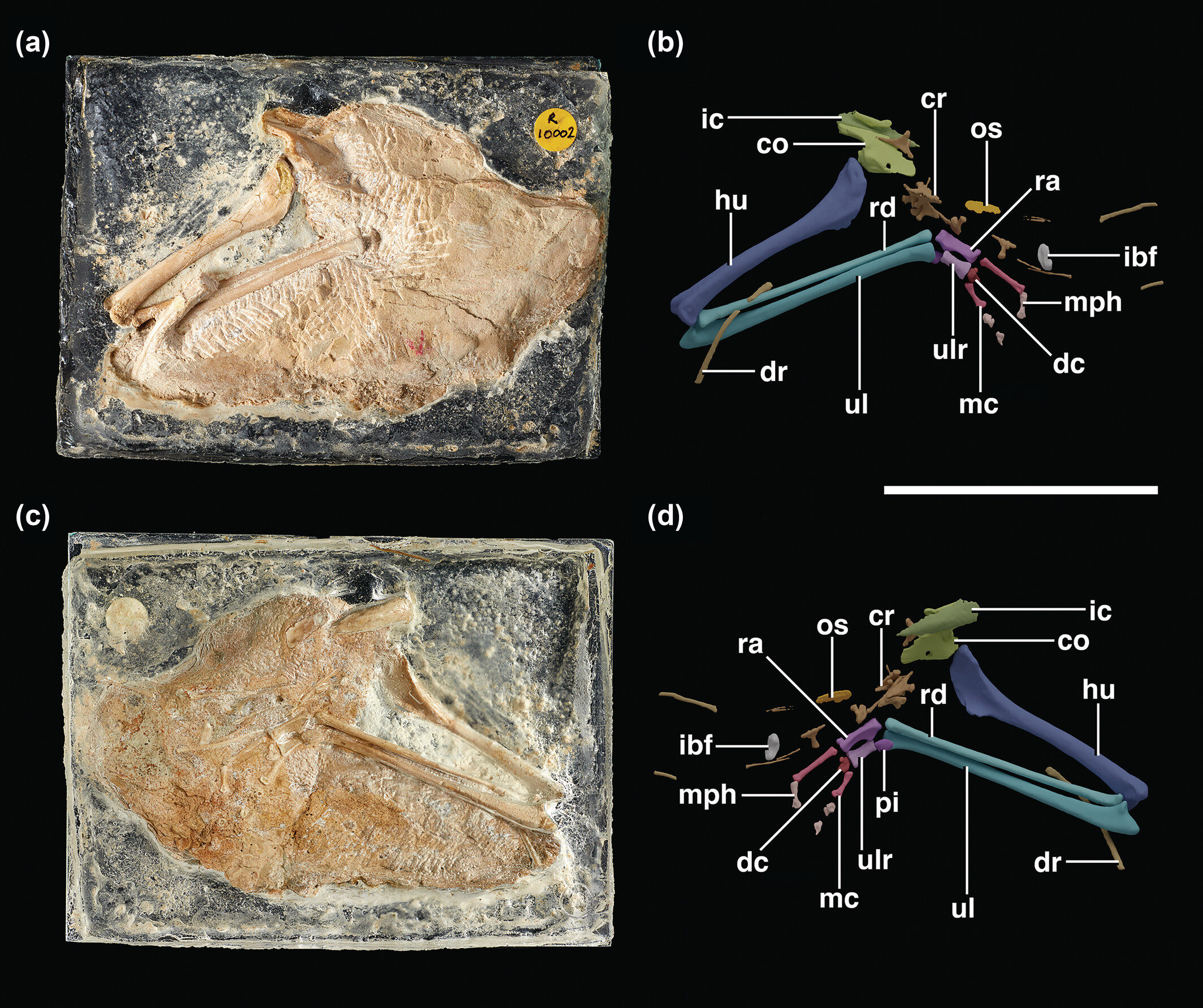
- Blocks A and B of NHMUK PV R 10002

Scientific classification
- Kingdom: Animalia
- Phylum: Chordata
- Class: Reptilia
- Clade: Pseudosuchia
- Clade: Crocodylomorpha
- Family: †Saltoposuchidae
- Genus: †Galahadosuchus; Bodenham et al., 2026
- Species: †G. jonesi

Binomial name
- †Galahadosuchus jonesi Bodenham et al., 2026

= Galahadosuchus =

Galahadosuchus Temporal range: Late Triassic Carnian–Rhaetian

Genus of reptile

Galahadosuchus is an extinct genus of saltoposuchid crocodylomorph from the Late Triassic fissure deposits of Cromhall Quarry in the United Kingdom. It is known from a partial postcranial skeleton including most of the hindlimbs, an almost complete forelimb and a series of tail vertebrae. Based on these remains Galahadosuchus was a gracile animal with long, slender limbs. Like many other early crocodylomorphs it is considered to have been a terrestrial quadruped, showing evidence of an erect, digitigrade stance and adaptations towards a cursorial lifestyle. Though very similar to the related Terrestrisuchus, some subtle anatomical differences might suggest that the two taxa differed slightly in their locomotion, with Galahadosuchus possibly having been a faster animal with more flexible hands. Only a single species has been described, Galahadosuchus jonesi.

== History and naming ==
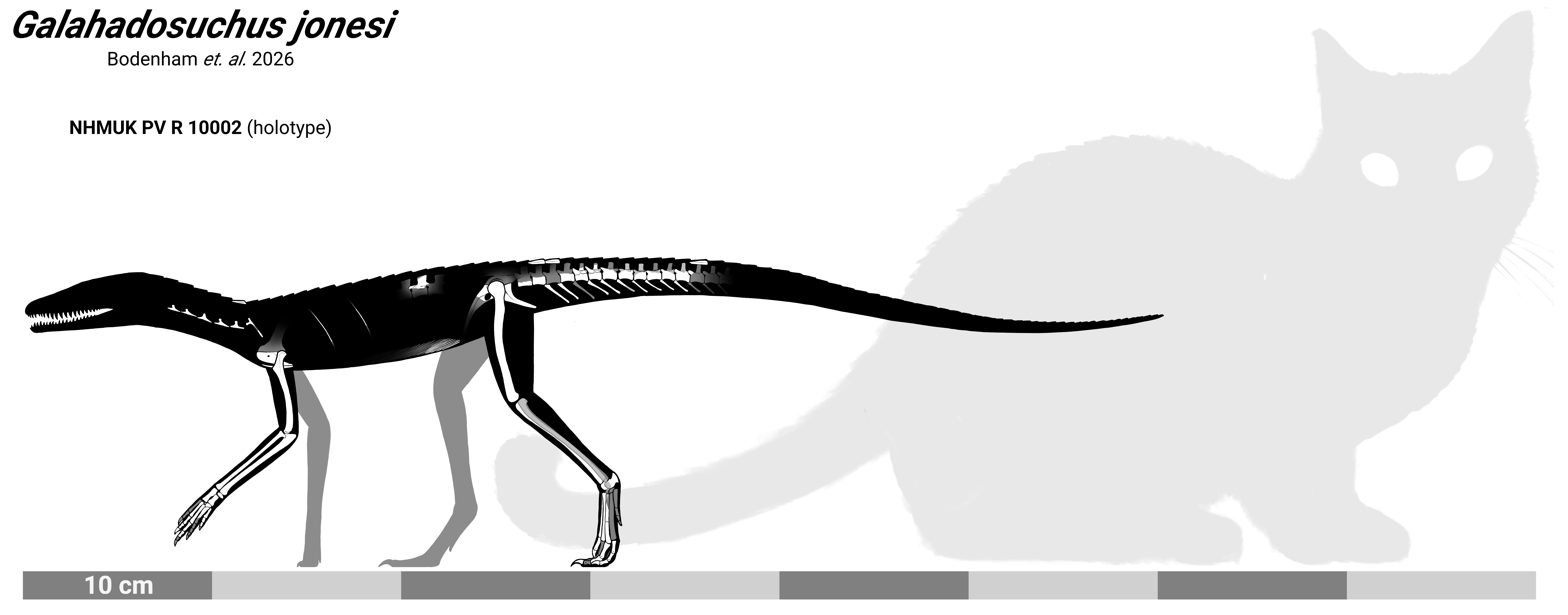
Skeletal reconstruction and size comparison, showcasing the known elements of the holotype

The holotype specimen of Galahadosuchus, NHMUK PV R 10002, was recovered by Ron Croucher in 1969 from site 1 of the fissure deposits at Cromhall Quarry in Gloucestershire, southwest England. The specimen is preserved across two slabs and consists of a partially articulated postcranial skeleton including parts of the tail and hindlimbs, a nearly complete right forelimb, several isolated elements such as osteoderms, ribs and non-caudal vertebrae as well as the remains of a rhynchocephalian reptile. The Cromhall Quarry, also known as Slickstones Quarry, is one of several Late Triassic to Early Jurassic fissure fill deposits in the Bristol Channel area that have previously yielded crocodylomorph remains including those of the saltoposuchid Terrestrisuchus (from the Pant-y-Ffynnon Quarry). Many of these remains have at times either been compared to Terrestrisuchus or assigned to the genus wholesale, though later revisions showed them to frequently be too fragmentary for such specific referrals. In one such case, then not mentioned by their inventory number, the specimen NHMUK PV R 10002 and some other disarticulated remains from other sites (numbered 1-5 and 7) in the Cromhall Quarry were referred to Terrestrisuchus by Fraser and colleagues in 2002, who regarded them to represent two different morphs of the genus, both of which were deemed different from the type material from Pant-y-Ffynnon.

While Fraser and colleagues did not describe the material nor provide a concrete reasoning for their assignments and distinctions, a brief description of the material was published by R. C. Allen in a PhD thesis in 2010 partially agreeing with their assertion. In this thesis Allen argued that while NHMUK PV R 10002 was referrable to Terrestrisuchus gracilis, the remains from the other Cromhall Quarry sites held at the Virginia Museum of Natural History were not. In 2023 and 2024, Spiekman and colleagues held that contrary to the works of Fraser et al. (2002) and Allen (2010), NHMUK PV R 10002 was not assignable to Terrestrisuchus, though the team deamed a full redescription to be beyond the scope of their work.

The name Galahadosuchus derives from Sir Galahad of Arthurian legend and is a play on words. As explained by Bodenham and colleagues, Galahad is renowned for being upright in a moral sense in the myth, while Galahadosuchus is also upright, albeit in relation to its posture. The ending of the genus name "suchus" is derived from the Greek word for crocodile as frequently used in the scientific names of fossil pseudosuchians. The species name "jonesi" was chosen in honor of David Rhys Jones, a teacher at the Ysgol Uwchradd Aberteifi school in Wales, who was an inspirational figure to lead author Ewan H. Bodenham, supporting student′s pursuit of science.

== Description ==
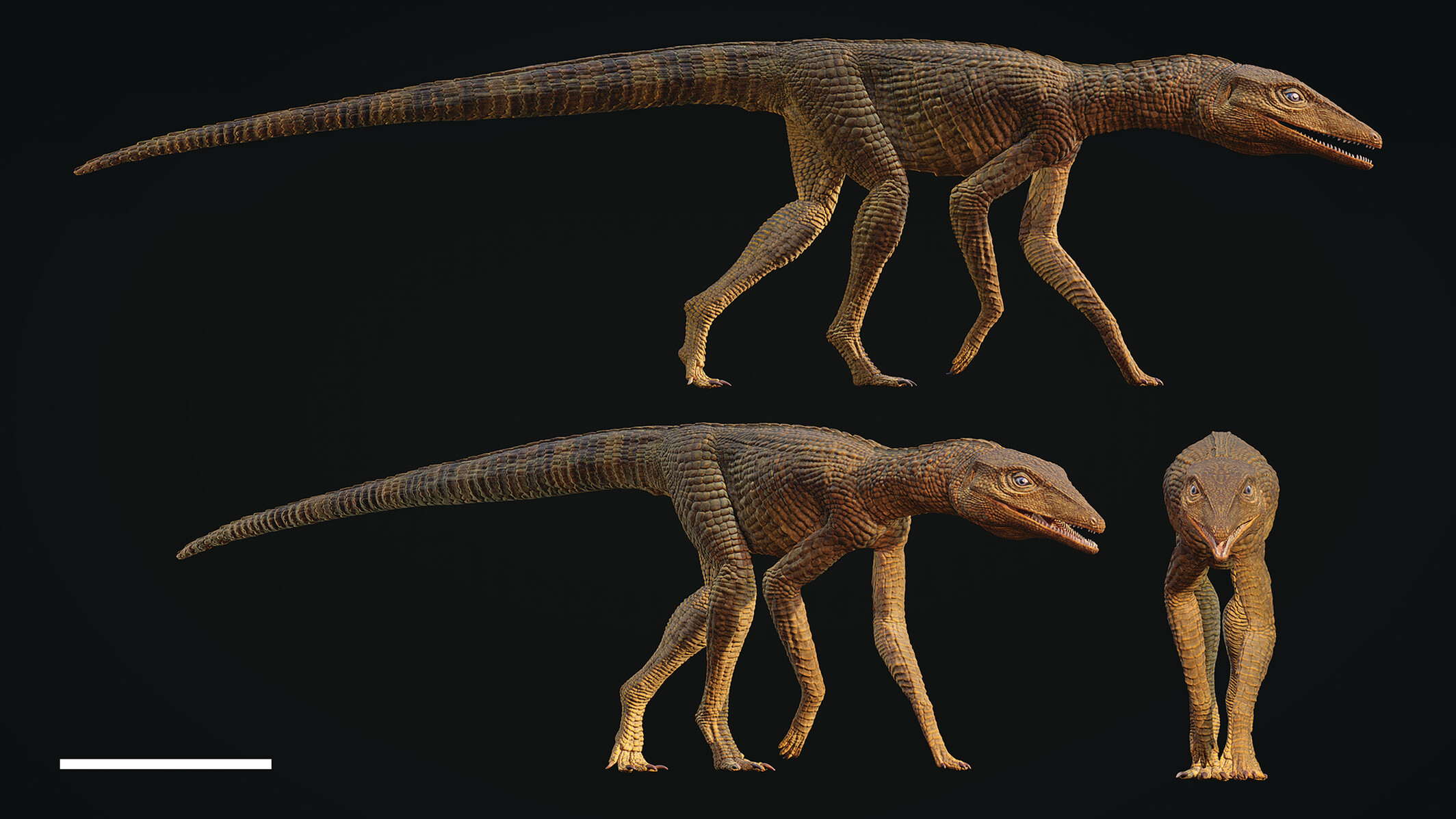
Live reconstruction of Galahadosuchus jonesi.

Galahadosuchus was a digitigrade quadrupedal crocodylomorph with long and slender limbs. Among the distinguishing features of this genus are the relatively short and stout ulnare and radiale, the proximal carpal bones, who′s with exceeds a quarter of their maximum length. Typically, the proximal carpal bones of early crocodylomorphs are described as long and slender, one other exception being Trialestes, although in this form only the radiale is described as shortened. Each bone is at most only a tenth the length of their respective limb bone pairing in the forearm, i.e. radius plus humerus for the radiale and ulna plus humerus for the ulnare. Here the ratio is again comparable to what is seen in Trialestes and even Terrestrisuchus, albeit only applying to the ulnare. Like in Trialestes the radiale is also marked by a deep concavity located at the posterior end of the bone but stretching across the entirety of the shaft.

As in most other early crocodylomorphs the back of Galahadosuchus was covered by what a double-row of paramedian osteoderms. The individual bony plates are elongated, 2.5 times longer than wide and therefore more elongated than in Saltoposuchus and Hesperosuchus (among others) but not as much as in Terrestrisuchus. However this information is limited to only a select few osteoderms and most of the armor of Galahadosuchus is unknown, which is significant since osteoderm proportions may vary in accordance with their position along the spinal column. Their shape is described as "leaf-shaped" or subrectangular, featuring a straight medial edge where each osteoderm meets its partner and a curved outer edge that flows into a spike-like process towards the front. The surface is ornamented by a pattern of shallow pits that surround a long keel that runs down the osteoderms midline. The sculpting is similar to Terrestrisuchus but markedly less developed than in other early crocodylomorphs. The underside of the osteoderms bears a groove stretching about a quarter of the length measured from the posterior end. This groove shows how the osteoderms articulated with each other, as the dorsal keel of the subsequent osteoderm slides into it to allow for an arrangement where each plate overlays the one behind it.

== Phylogeny ==
Both phylogenetic analysis run by Bodenham and colleagues recovered Galahadosuchus as a member of the family Saltoposuchidae and in both instances it was found to be the sister taxon of Terrestrisuchus from the nearby Pant-y-Ffynnon Quarry. Equal weighting of phylogenetic characters recovers a family resembling the results of Spiekman et al. (2023), whose dataset the analysis was based on. In the resulting tree, the immediate sister form to both Galahadosuchus and Terrestrisuchus is Litargosuchus, with Saltoposuchus as the family's basalmost member. Extended implied weighting meanwhile recovered different results based on the used k-value. A k-value of 13-15 results in the same topology as under equal weights, but a k-value of 3-12 changes the resulting tree in minor ways. While the close ties between Galahadosuchus and Terrestrisuchus are retained, Litargosuchus is instead recovered as a more derived crocodylomorph while Saltoposuchus is moved closer to the former within the family. Its place as basalmost saltoposuchid is taken by Hesperosuchus.

- - Suchia
    - Stagonolepis
    - - Gracilisuchus
      - - Saurosuchus
        - - Postosuchus
          - Crocodylomorpha
            - CM 73372
            - Carnufex
            - Redondavenator
            - Erpetosuchus
            - - - Trialestes
                - Pseudohesperosuchus
              - - Saltoposuchidae
                  - Saltoposuchus
                  - - Litargosuchus
                    - - Terrestrisuchus
                      - Galahadosuchus
                - - - Hesperosuchus
                    - - Dromicosuchus
                      - Kayentasuchus
                  - - Sphenosuchus
                    - - Dibothrosuchus
                      - - Junggarsuchus
                        - - - Almadasuchus
                            - - Macelognathus
                              - Hallopus
                          - Crocodyliformes

- - Suchia
    - Stagonolepis
    - - Gracilisuchus
      - - Saurosuchus
        - - Postosuchus
          - Crocodylomorpha
            - CM 73372
            - Carnufex
            - Redondavenator
            - Erpetosuchus
            - - - Trialestes
                - Pseudohesperosuchus
              - - Saltoposuchidae
                  - Hesperosuchus
                  - - Saltoposuchus
                    - - Terrestrisuchus
                      - Galahadosuchus
                - - - Dromicosuchus
                    - Kayentasuchus
                  - - Litargosuchus
                    - - Sphenosuchus
                      - - Dibothrosuchus
                        - - Junggarsuchus
                          - - - Almadasuchus
                              - - Macelognathus
                                - Hallopus
                            - Crocodyliformes

== Paleobiology ==
Like other small, slender early crocodylomorphs including the closely related Terrestrisuchus, Galahadosuchus has been interpreted as a terrestrial, possibly cursorial quadruped with an erect posture. The fact that the forelimbs appear to be load-bearing and were only slightly shorter than the hindlimbs compared to bipedal forms speaks for a quadrupedal stance, as does the fact that the forelimbs were digitigrade, with the elongated proximal carpals forming a single functional unit. The shape of the femur meanwhile, with its distinct medially directed head, indicates an erect stance, as this morphology restricts the hindlimbs movement to the parasagittal plane, therefore setting it apart from the more sprawling stance taken on by modern crocodilians.

However, while these factors broadly align with what is seen in other small early crocodylomorphs like Terrestrisuchus, there are subtle differences between Galahadosuchus and its closest relatives that may suggest slight differences in their respective locomotion. For example, the precise proportions between fore- and hindlimbs are not exactly one to one. When humerus and femur measurements were plotted in the dataset of McPhee et al., as had previously been done for Terrestrisuchus by Spiekman and colleagues, they were found to still cluster with other quadrupedal forms, but slightly closer to bipedal forms than Terrestrisuchus. The humerus does not contribute as much to the forelimb as in Terrestrisuchus and the ratio between forelimb length to hindlimb length, when factoring into the fact that the functional length of a digitigrade animal would include the metacarpals and metatarsals, shows that Galahadosuchus had slightly shorter forelimbs than Terrestrisuchus. The proximal carpals are relatively more robust and there may have been an additional bony distal carpal bone not seen in Terrestrisuchus, though the latter may have been caused by preservation. On the other hand, the fifth metacarpal of Galahadosuchus is not as well developed as its counterpart in Terrestrisuchus, instead bearing closer resemblance to the first digit. The ratio between the length of the femur and the metatarsals is greater than in Terrestrisuchus.

The exact implications of these differences is at least partially unclear, but do suggest that Terrestrisuchus and Galahadosuchus differed slightly in the way these animal moved. The fact that Galahadosuchus plots slightly closer to bipedal forms could be interpreted as a sign of being less quadrupedally adapted or perhaps even suggest that the animal was a facultative biped, however Bodenham and colleagues point out that there's no actual anatomical evidence for this idea and that the dataset suffers from its lack of small-bodied terrestrial forms that would allow for direct comparison. Similarly, the fact that the humerus does not contribute as much to the forelimbs as in Terrestrisuchus could be interpreted as a sign of the animal being less capable of terrestrial movement based on prior studies, but again the team that described Galahadosuchus raised the caveat that the used dataset might be influenced by the inclusion of modern crocodiles with their generally sprawling rather than erect posture. Furthermore the team highlights that the humerus′ contribution to the forelimbs is even inconsistent within Terrestrisuchus, suggesting that age and growth stage could be additional factors.

The elongated proximal carpals of early crocodylomorphs are thought to be an adaptation to bearing the animal′s weight, forming a single functional unit. Contrasting this, the shorter, more robust radiale and ulnare of Galahadosuchus might have had the opposite effect, making the hand more flexible than those of its relatives. The shortened first metacarpal seen in both Galahadosuchus and Terrestrisuchus likely means that the matching digit was likewise shorter, something which has been interpreted as a sign that this particular finger did not bear the animal′s weight when on the ground. The fact that the same shortening appears to be present in the fifth metacarpal would then suggest that neither the first nor last digit of the hands were actually weight-bearing, only the middle three. Finally the greater metatarsal to femur ratio may mean that Galahadosuchus was a faster runner than its sister taxon.
