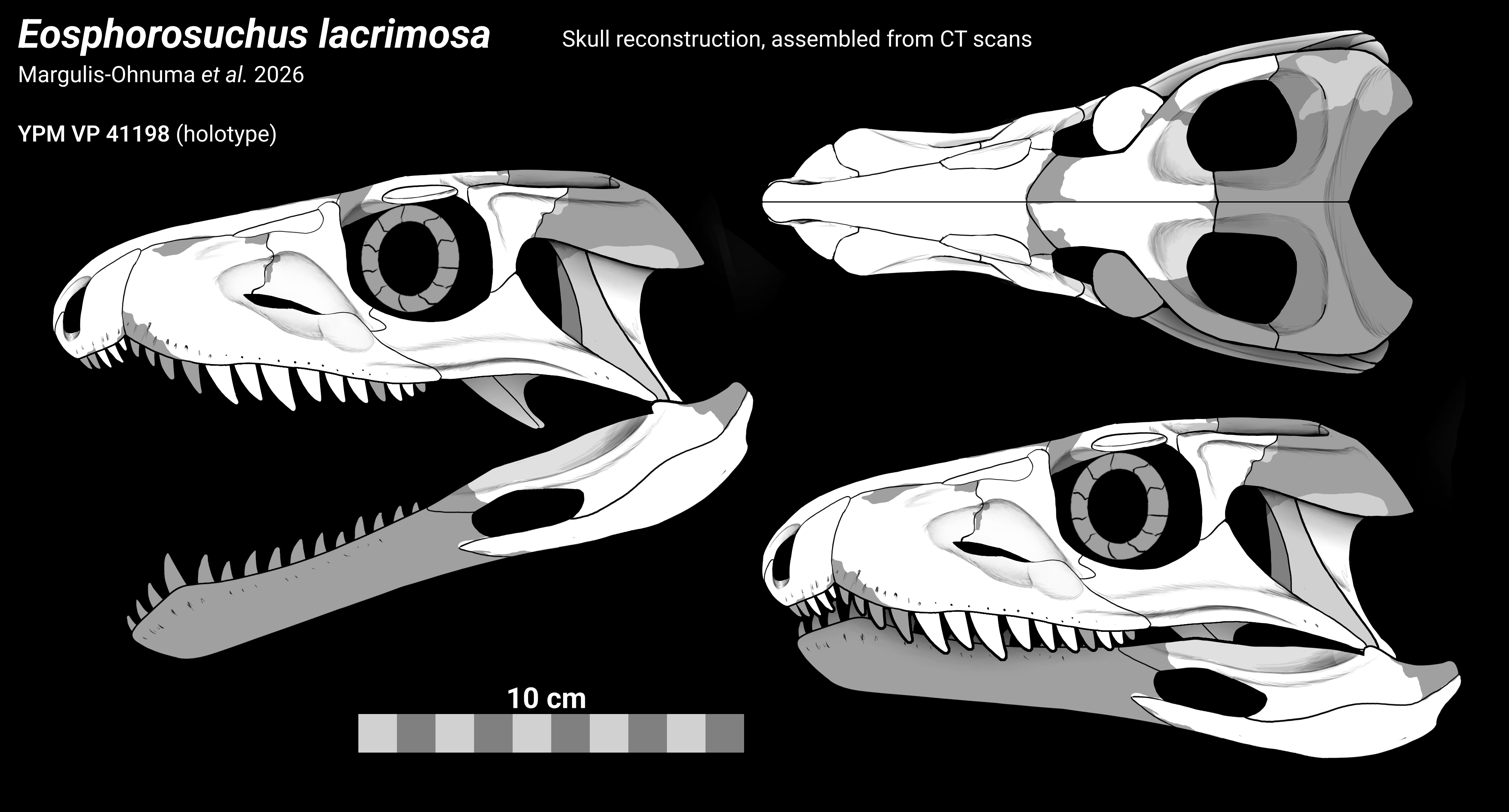

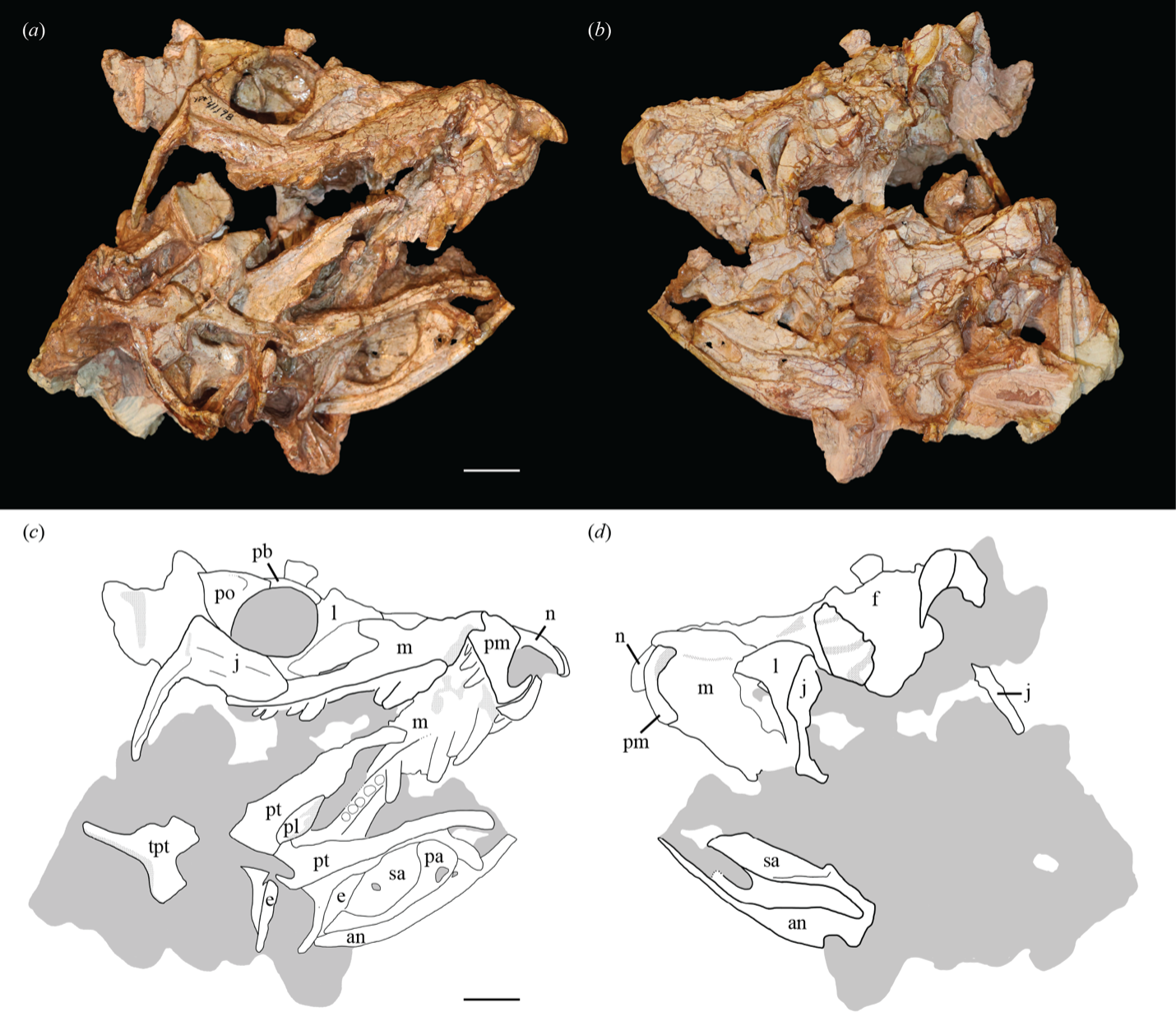
- Reconstructed skull of the holotype (top) and original specimen (bottom)

Scientific classification
- Kingdom: Animalia
- Phylum: Chordata
- Class: Reptilia
- Clade: Pseudosuchia
- Clade: Crocodylomorpha
- Genus: †Eosphorosuchus; Margulis-Ohnuma et al., 2026
- Species: †E. lacrimosa

Binomial name
- †Eosphorosuchus lacrimosa Margulis-Ohnuma et al., 2026

= Eosphorosuchus =

Eosphorosuchus Temporal range: Late Triassic, Rhaetian

Genus of extinct crocodylomorph

Eosphorosuchus (lit. 'Eosphoros crocodile') is an extinct genus of early crocodylomorph pseudosuchian known from the Late Triassic (Rhaetian age) Chinle Formation of Ghost Ranch, New Mexico, United States. The genus contains a single species, Eosphorosuchus lacrimosa, known from a partial skull and skeleton. It is characterized by its unusually short snout, with adaptations for a strong bite. One of the toe bones of this specimen is swollen where the animal was bitten on its foot, an injury from which it recovered before its death.

== Discovery and naming ==
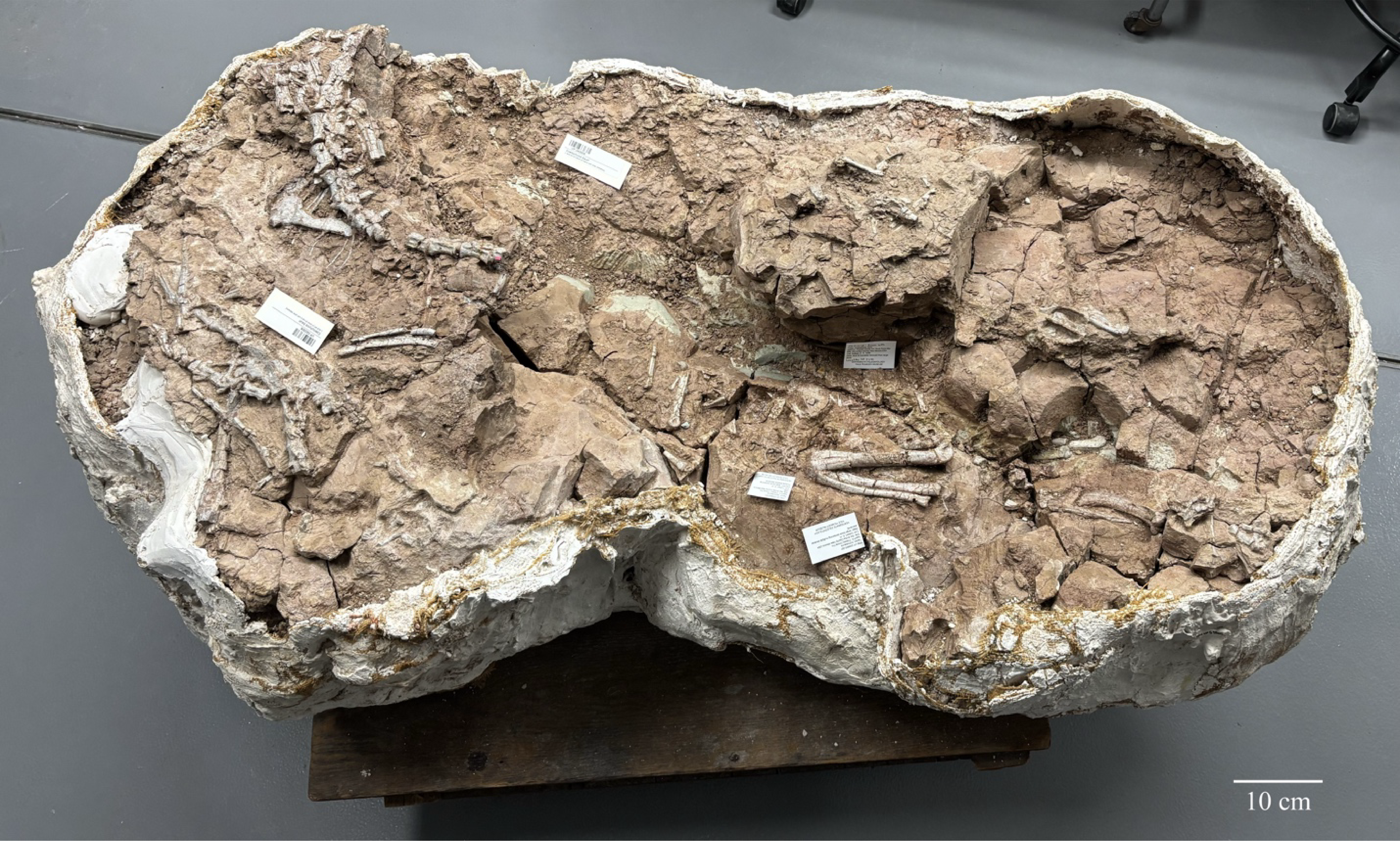
Original block from the Coelophysis Quarry that yielded the E. lacrimosa holotype

The Eosphorosuchus fossil material was discovered in the Coelophysis Quarry at Ghost Ranch, northern New Mexico, United States. This fossil site, representing outcrops of the Chinle Formation, preserves a mass burial of a coeval Triassic fauna, dominated by fossils of Coelophysis bauri. The block containing this specimen was collected by a team from the American Museum of Natural History in 1948. In the mid-1960s, John Ostrom acquired it for the Yale Peabody Museum (YPM), where it is now permanently accessioned as specimen YPM VP 41198. The specimen consists of the anterior (front) part of the skull, including the snout, skull roof, and palate, the posterior (rear) part of the left mandibular ramus (lower jaw), in addition to a cervical (neck) vertebra, both pubes, most of the left hindlimb, and three osteoderms. The specimen was initially regarded as belonging to Hesperosuchus agilis.

In 2026, Miranda Margulis-Ohnuma and colleagues described Eosphorosuchus lacrimosa as a new genus and species of crocodylomorph based on these fossil remains, establishing YPM VP 41198 as the holotype specimen. The generic name, Eosphorosuchus, references Eosphoros (lit. 'dawn bringer'), who, alongside Hesperos, is a Greek god of the planet Venus. This was chosen in allusion to the early ('dawn') evolution of crocodylomorphs, as well as the historical connection of the holotype with the closely related Hesperosuchus. This is combined with the Latinized Greek word soûkhos (suchus), derived from the Hellenized name of Sobek, the crocodile-headed deity of Ancient Egyptian myth. The specific name, lacrimosa, references the distinct lacrimal region of this species' skull.

== Description ==
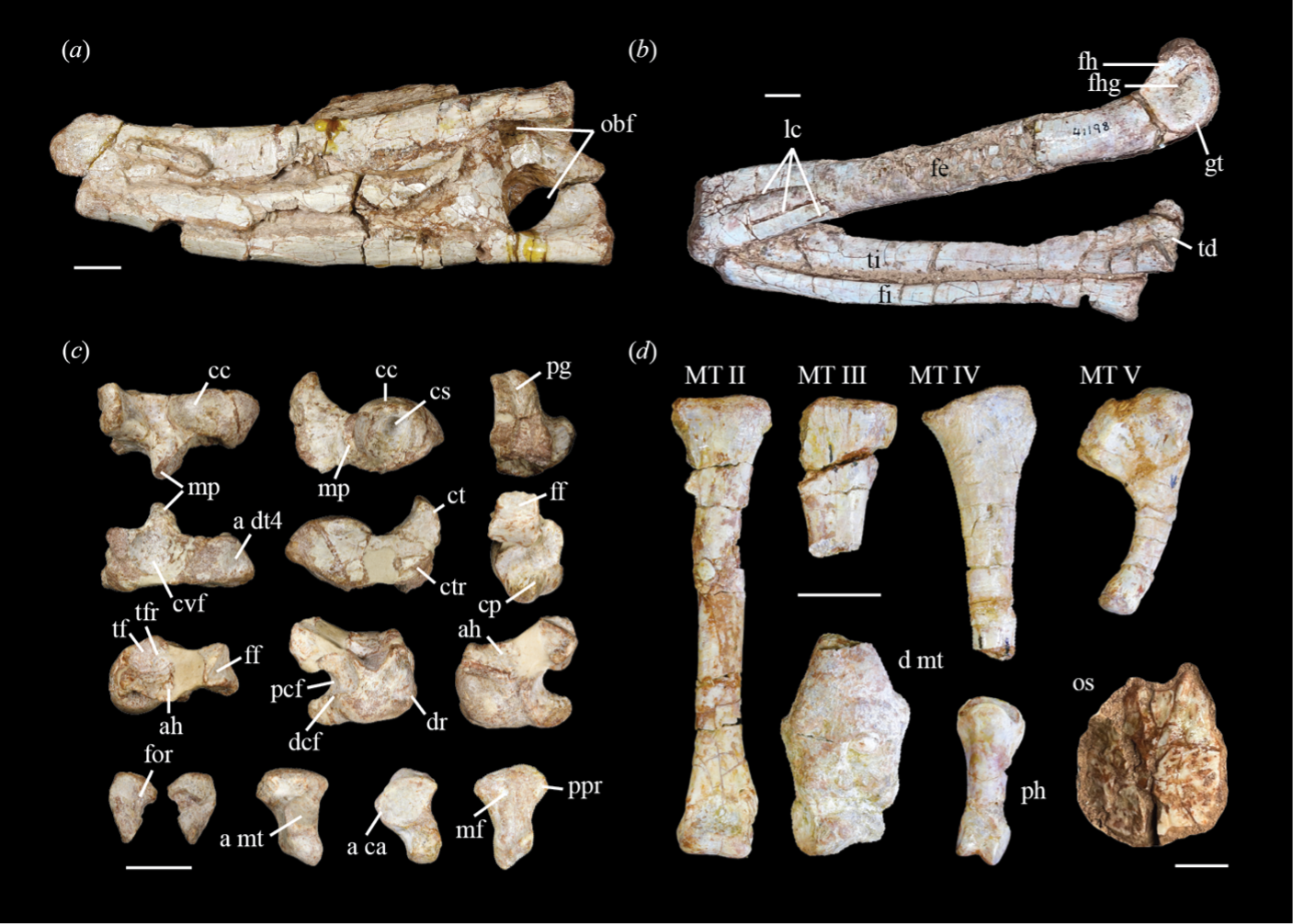
Postcranial bones of the holotype

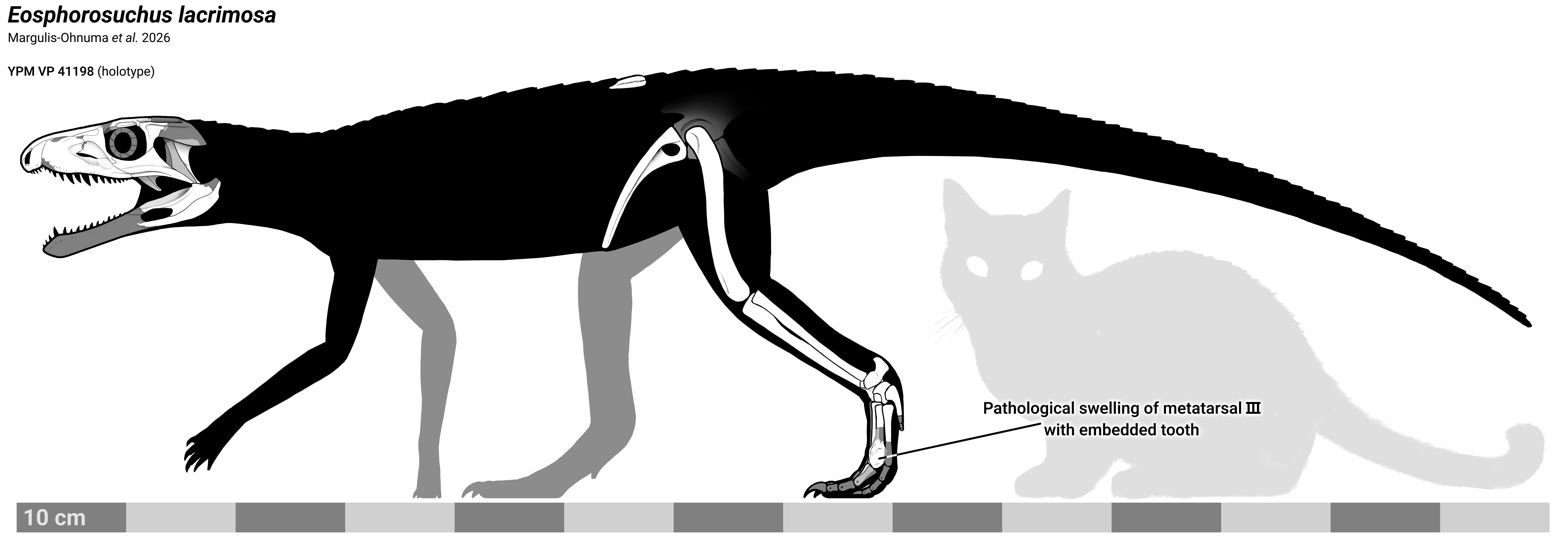
Skeletal reconstruction and size comparison of the holotype

The skull of Eosphorosuchus is fairly short and robust compared to other crocodylomorphs, being noticeably taller in relation to length than those of Dibothrosuchus or Terrestrisuchus. Many of the skull bones are broad and highly ossified, and there is direct evidence of specialization for a strong bite force, with both the reinforced postorbital bone and a large accommodation on its surangular, suggesting unusually well-developed mandibular adductor musculature. The antorbital fenestra is greatly reduced and nearly closed, likely for skull reinforcement. The orbit is large and circular, and the teeth are sharp and recurved.

The preserved hindlimb is long and gracile, as in other crocodylomorphs. Four of the five metatarsals are preserved. The outermost metatarsal, metatarsal 5, is shorter and possesses a hooked shape, which is usually seen in more basal pseudosuchians. The third metatarsal bears a pronounced pathological swelling of the bone associated with an embedded tooth fragment, indicating the animal received a bite on its left foot, leaving an injury which subsequently healed during its lifetime.

Three osteoderms are known from Eosphorosuchus. These are comparatively wider and more circular in shape than its relatives, and possess a midline keel.

== Classification ==
To test the affinities and relationships of Eosphorosuchus, Margulis-Ohnuma and colleagues (2026) included it in an expanded version of the phylogenetic matrix of Wang et al. (2025). They recovered it as an early-diverging member of the Crocodylomorpha, in an unresolved polytomy with several other basal crocodylomorphs, including UCMP 129470, a specimen historically referred to Sphenosuchus or Hesperosuchus but likely not belonging to either of these genera due to their more derived placements in the tree. These results are displayed in the cladogram below:

- Crocodylomorpha
  - †Gracilisuchus stipanicicorum
  - - †Postosuchus kirkpatricki
    - - †Eosphorosuchus lacrimosa
      - UCMP 129470 (†'Hesperosuchus agilis')
      - †Trialestes romeri
      - †Pseudhesperosuchus jachaleri
      - †Carnufex carolinensis
      - - - †Hesperosuchus agilis (AMNH FR 6758)
          - CM 29894 (†'Hesperosuchus agilis')
        - - †Dromicosuchus grallator
          - †Redondavenator quayensis
          - - - †Kayentasuchus walkeri
              - - †Saltoposuchus connectens
                - - †Litargosuchus leptorhynchus
                  - †Terrestrisuchus gracilis
            - - †Sphenosuchus acutus
              - - †Dibothrosuchus elaphros
                - - - †Junggarsuchus sloani
                    - †Phyllodontosuchus lufengensis
                  - - - †Hallopus victor
                      - - †Almadasuchus figarii
                        - †Macelognathus vagans
                    - - Crocodyliformes
