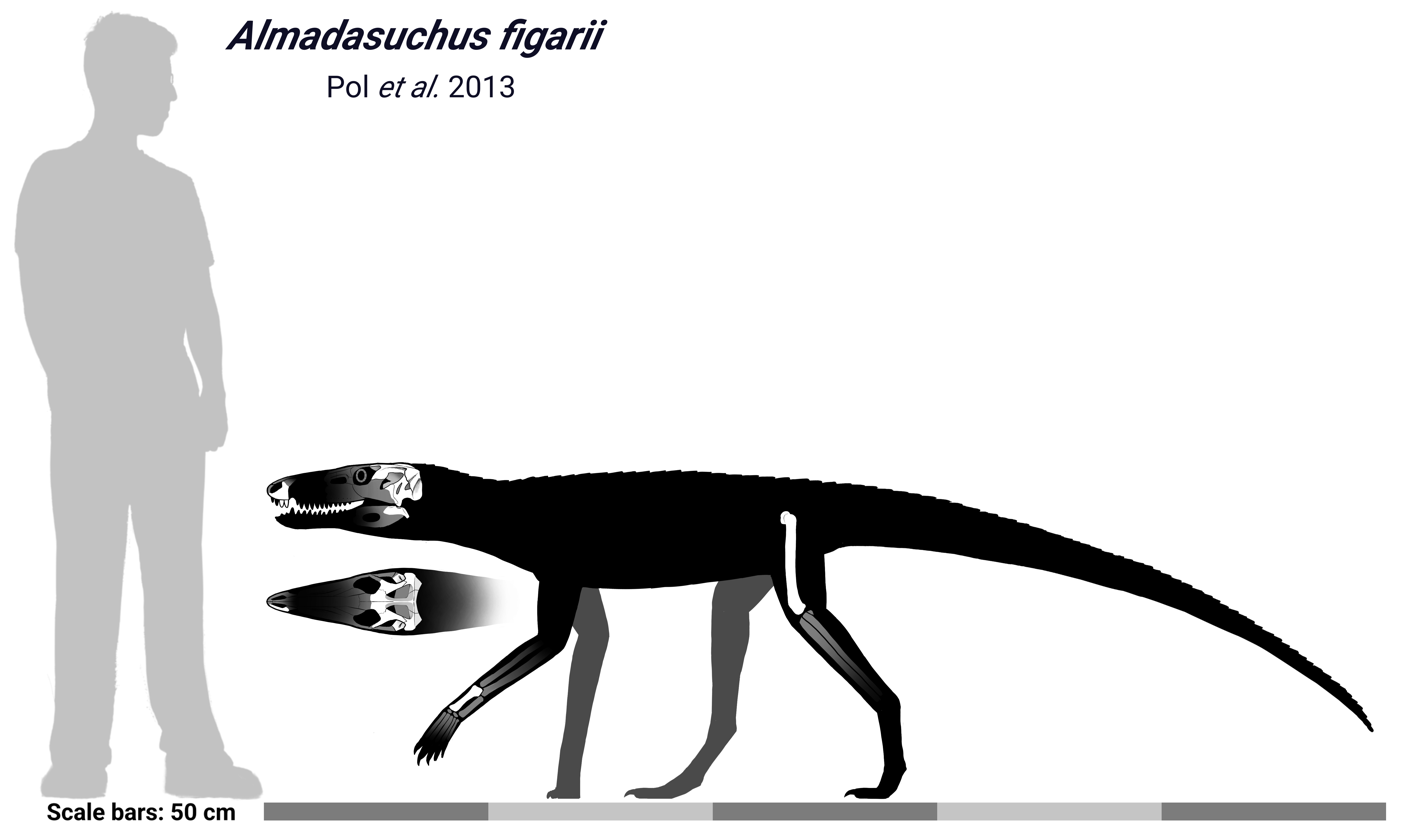
- Skeletal reconstruction of the known elements of the holotype (in white)

Scientific classification
- Kingdom: Animalia
- Phylum: Chordata
- Class: Reptilia
- Clade: Pseudosuchia
- Clade: Crocodylomorpha
- Family: †Hallopodidae
- Genus: †Almadasuchus; Pol et al. 2013

Type species
- †Almadasuchus figarii Pol et al. 2013

= Almadasuchus =

Almadasuchus Temporal range: ~157.387 Ma Oxfordian

Extinct genus of reptiles

Almadasuchus is an extinct genus of crocodylomorph known from the early Late Jurassic (early Oxfordian stage) Puesto Almada Member of the Cañadón Calcáreo Formation of Patagonia, Argentina. It contains a single species, Almadasuchus figarii. It is known from the holotype MPEF-PV 3838, a well-preserved posterior region of the skull as well as other skull and postcranial remains. Almadasuchus was recovered from Puesto Almada, 30 m above the fish beds, dated as Oxfordian in age.

== Description ==
According to a phylogenetic analysis that accompanied the first description of the species, A. figarii is the sister taxon or closest relative of the clade Crocodyliformes, a large group that originated in the Late Triassic and includes modern crocodilians. It is also a close relative of "sphenosuchians", a paraphyletic group of more basal non-crocodyliform crocodylomorphs. Almadasuchus is most closely related to the "sphenosuchian" Junggarsuchus from the Middle Jurassic of China. Almadasuchus is one of only four non-crocodyliform crocodylomorphs known from after the Early Jurassic, the others being Junggarsuchus and two "sphenosuchians" from the Late Jurassic Morrison Formation in the western United States, Hallopus and Macelognathus. Crocodyliforms appeared in the Late Triassic and began a major evolutionary radiation in the Jurassic, making Almadasuchus one of the last non-crocodyliform crocodylomorphs.

Almadasuchus is considered a transitional form between crocodyliforms and earlier archosaurs with respect to its braincase. In nearly all diapsid reptiles the braincase is weakly connected to other bones that make up the back of the skull, making this region flexible or kinetic. In crocodyliforms, the braincase is strongly sutured to a bone called the quadrate, making the skull completely immovable or akinetic. The quadrate of Almadasuchus is not completely fused to the braincase, but makes connections with two braincase bones, the basisphenoid and the exoccipital. These two attachment points probably made the skull of Almadasuchus completely akinetic. Jungarrsuchus, which is the second most closely related non-crocodyliform crocodylomorph to crocodyliforms, has a quadrate that only attaches to the exoccipital.

== Phylogeny ==
Below is a cladogram modified from Pol et al. (in press).

- Crocodylomorpha
  - Pseudhesperosuchus
  - - Dromicosuchus
    - Hesperosuchus
    - Kayentasuchus
    - Saltoposuchus
    - - Litargosuchus
      - Terrestrisuchus
    - - Sphenosuchus
      - - Dibothrosuchus
        - - Junggarsuchus
          - - Almadasuchus
            - Crocodyliformes
              - Protosuchus
              - - Orthosuchus
                - - Gobiosuchus
                  - - Sichuanosuchus
                    - - Zosuchus
                      - Mesoeucrocodylia
                        - - Hsisosuchus
                          - Notosuchia
                        - Neosuchia
