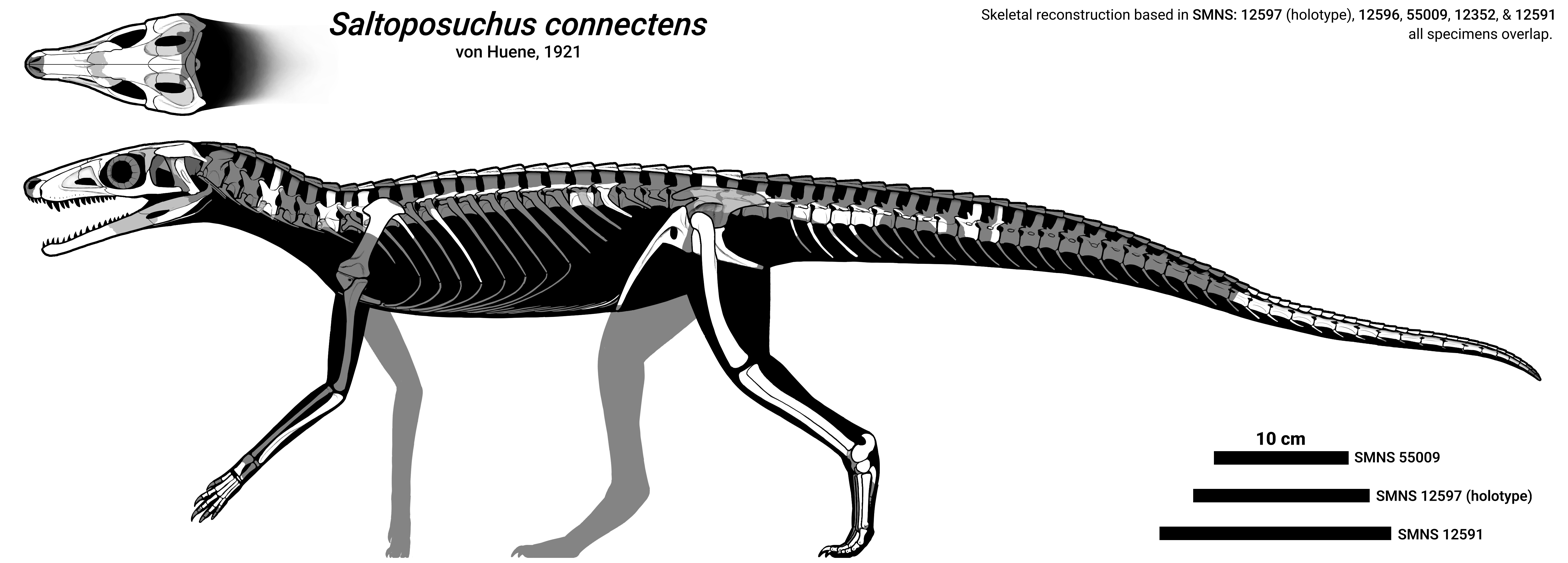
- Skeletal reconstruction
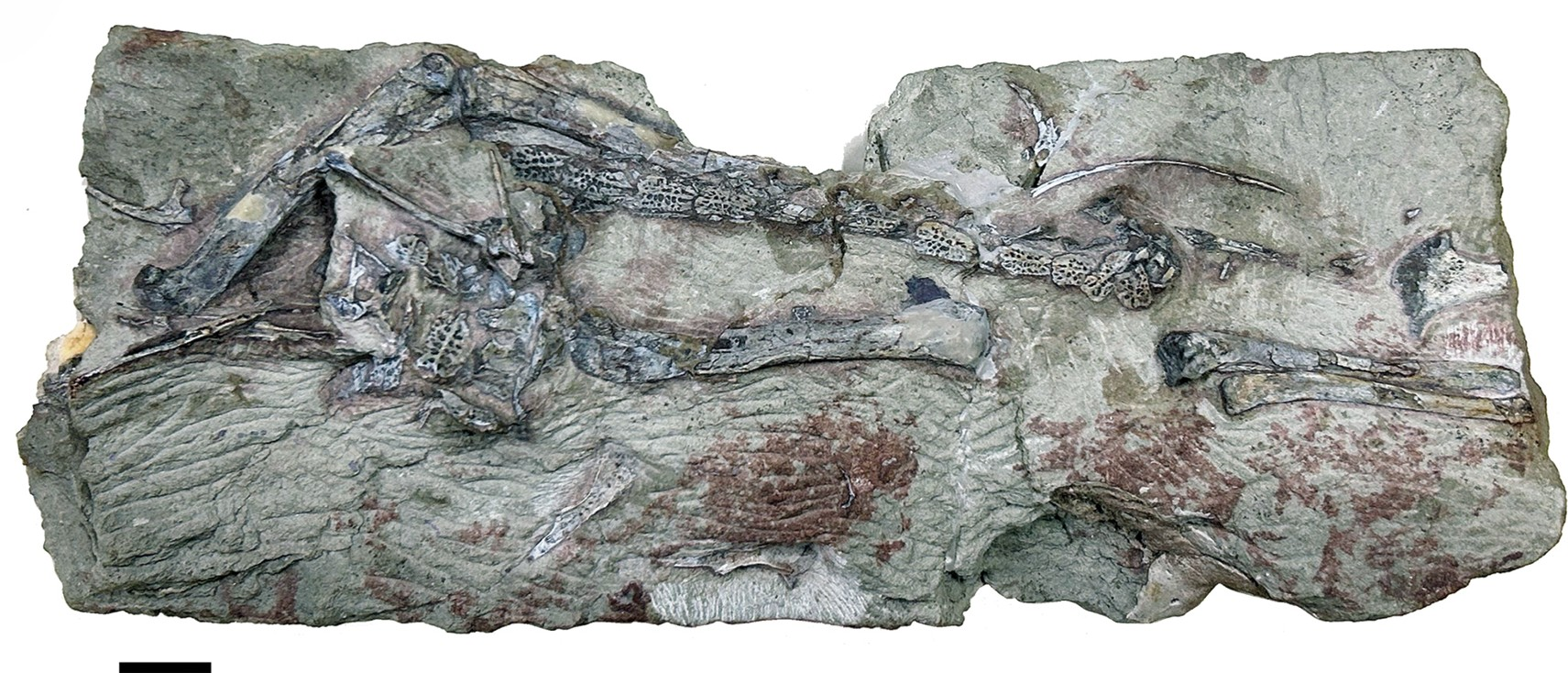
- One part of the holotype specimen

Scientific classification
- Kingdom: Animalia
- Phylum: Chordata
- Class: Reptilia
- Clade: Pseudosuchia
- Clade: Loricata
- Clade: Crocodylomorpha
- Family: †Saltoposuchidae; Crush, 1984
- Genus: †Saltoposuchus von Huene, 1921

Type species
- †Saltoposuchus connectens von Huene, 1921

= Saltoposuchus =

Saltoposuchus Temporal range: Late Triassic, 220 Ma

Extinct genus of reptiles

Saltoposuchus is an extinct genus of small, long-tailed crocodylomorph reptile (Sphenosuchia), from the Norian (Late Triassic) of Europe. The name translated means "leaping foot crocodile". It was commonly (and incorrectly) referred to in popular literature as the ancestor (or close ancestors) to dinosaurs; however, recent scientific research shows that this is not the case. It has been proposed that Terrestrisuchus was a juvenile junior synonym of Saltoposuchus, due to the similar anatomy and comparatively larger and more robust constitution of the latter, but several apparent anatomical differences between the two have been identified. All the known specimens come from juvenile individuals.

== Description and paleobiology ==
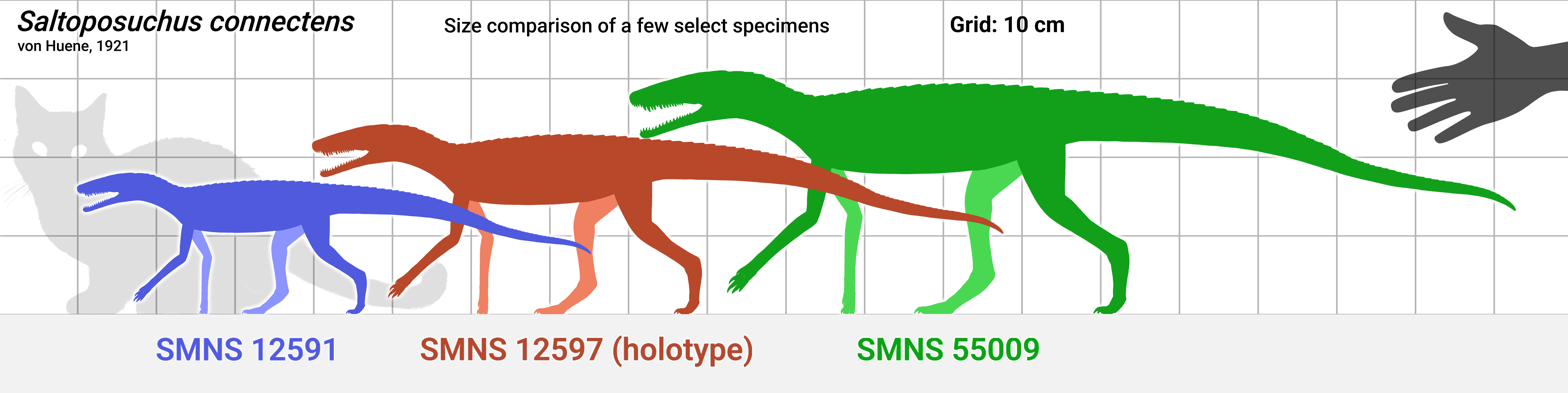
Size comparison of a few known specimens

Fossil evidence of Sphenosuchia and early crocodylomorphs lead paleontologists to conclude that Saltoposuchus is a terrestrial animal. As a monophyletic group of crocodylomorphs, Saltoposuchidae has many key morphological traits shared with most crocodylomorphs.

=== Skull ===
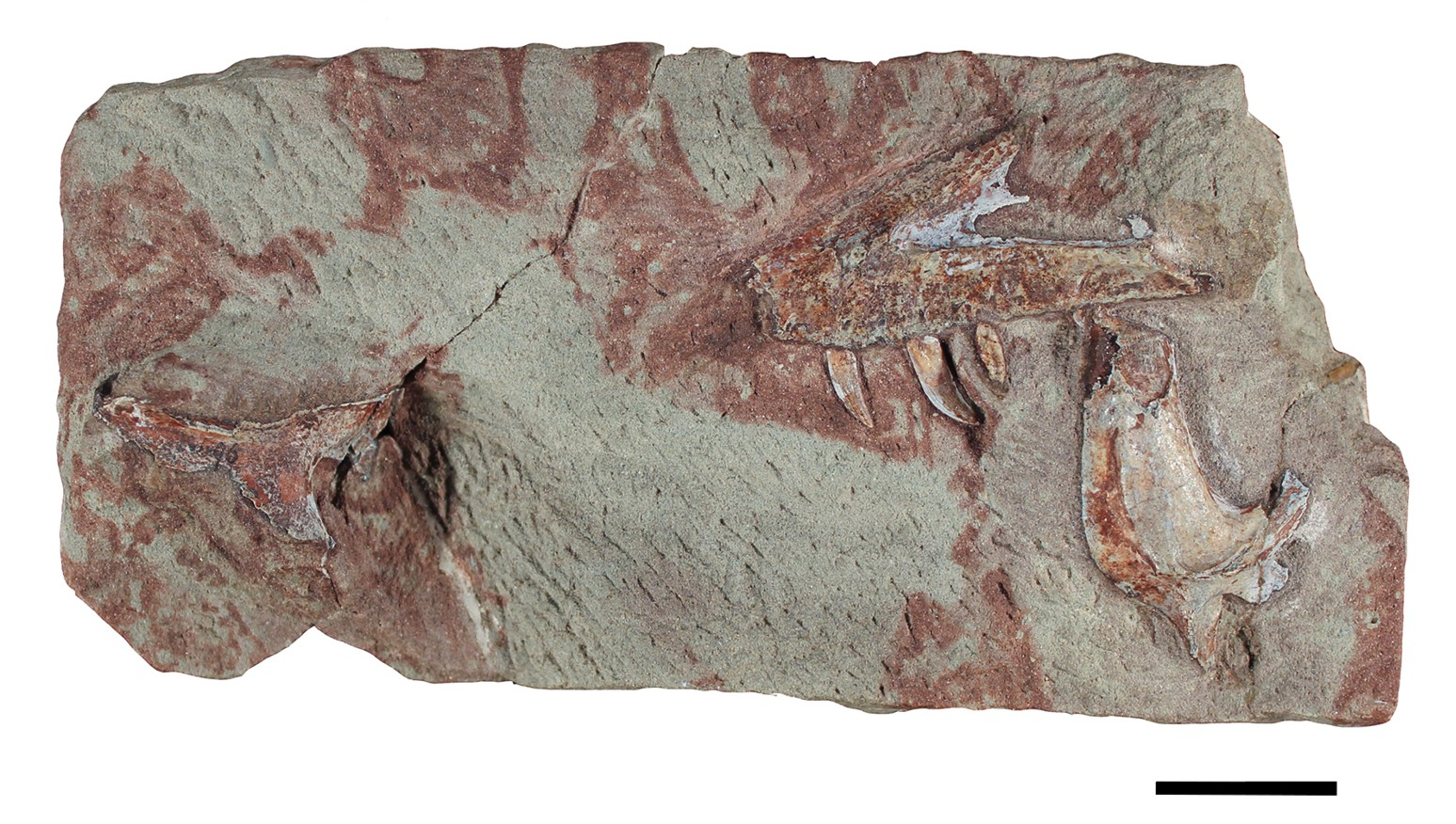
Skull bones of Saltoposuchus specimen SMNS 12596

Much like other crocodylomorphs, Saltoposuchus skulls had a (reduced) antorbital fenestra, a large, overhanging squamosal bone, and a medially shifted, forwards sloping quadrate and quadratojugal. Saltoposuchus has a long pointed skull and sharp, flattened teeth adapted for carnivory. In sphenosuchians, the quadrate head makes contact with the prootic and squamosal bones.

=== Skeleton ===
Saltoposuchus has a long backward pointing spine at the coracoid. Another key feature of Saltoposuchus includes a non-perforated acetabulum (hip joint), which is a defining characteristic of all dinosaurs. Saltoposuchus was considered to be bipedal based on its skeletal constitution, but this is due to the misidentification of an ulna as an overly elongated Metatarsal (and thus, hindlimb), and the forelimbs being reconstructed as too short on its original description. Saltoposuchus had a double row of bony scutes along its back, which can be seen on modern crocodilians today. These were arranged in a single pair per vertebra in the dorsal region, and roughly in 2 pairs per vertebra in the preserved segment of tail. Like with other sphenosuchians and early crocodylomorphs, Saltoposuchus had fully erect slender limbs, a slender body, and long legs. Saltoposuchus was likely fast and nimble. Molnar et al. concluded that the average mediolateral range of motion in the early crocodylomorphs was greater than dorsoventral range of motion, and dorsoventral stiffness was estimated to be higher than mediolateral stiffness. In the wrists of Saltoposuchus, the radiale and ulnare are elongated into rod shaped elements instead of being button-shaped, which is a shared characteristic among crocodylomorphs.

== Discovery ==
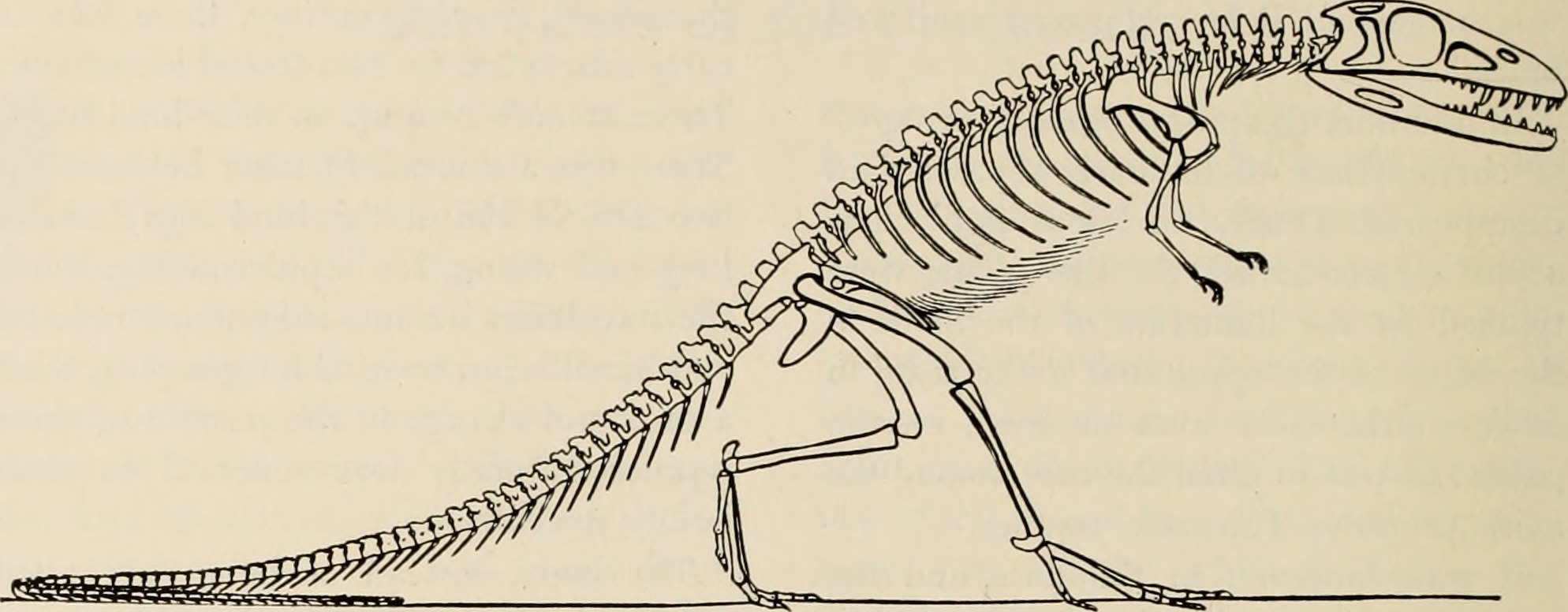
Outdated skeletal reconstruction of Saltoposuchus from 1921

Saltoposuchus connectens and Saltoposuchus longipes were discovered and named by German paleontologist Friedrich von Huene in 1921. Both species were found in the Burrer Quarry, Pfaffenhofen, which is an Alaunian terrestrial sandstone/marl in the Löwenstein Formation of south-west Germany. The Löwenstein Formation has been dated back to 215.6 - 212.0 Ma, which dates back to the Late Triassic Period. Fossils have also been found in the Trossingen Formation (also located in Germany), and the Lossiemouth Sandstone formation. Both species were found to be synonymous in a 2023 study

== Geographical/historical information ==
Fossils found in Germany indicate that Saltoposuchus existed in Europe, or more appropriately, Laurasia. The Mesozoic Era has been regarded as "The Age of Reptiles" so Saltoposuchus lived among many different species including the earliest species of pterosaurs and other bipedal reptilians. Archosaurs, the ancestor to Crocodylomorpha, made its first appearance in the middle of the Triassic era. This is also the period in which the earliest mammals started appearing. Therapsids dominated the Early - Middle Triassic Period, but as time went on, therapsids started becoming extinct and archosaurs became the dominant group of reptiles. After the Permian–Triassic extinction event wiped out 90% of species in the world, conifer forests started to recover, species started occupying and thriving in newly found ecological niches, Pangaea started splitting into Laurasia and Gondwana, and the air was very arid with hot summers and cold winters. After marine life had been wiped out by the mass extinction event, the Triassic waters were populated with very few families of fish. The Triassic Period showed the first development of modern stony corals and a time of modest reef building activity in the shallower waters of the Tethys near the coasts of Pangaea. During the Mesozoic Era, early mammals, reptilian species, and other insects populated the land. Arthropods that had survived the mass extinction and were existing during this time include spiders, scorpions, millipedes, centipedes, and a newer group of beetles.

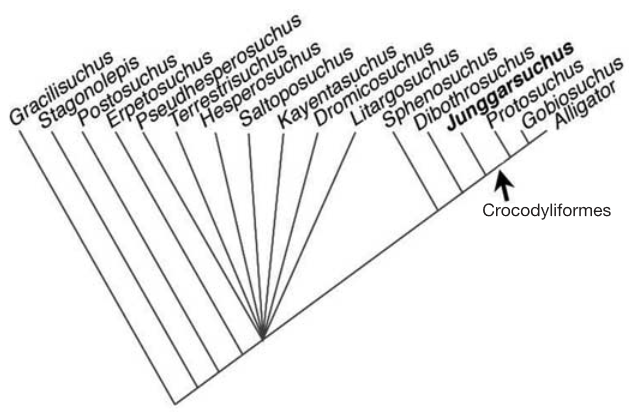
Cladogram of crocodylomorphs including Saltoposuchus and sister taxa

=== Related species ===
Sister groups to Saltoposuchus include Gracilisuchus, Hesperosuchus, Dromicosuchus, Dibothrosuchus, Terrestrisuchus, Litargosuchus, Kayentasuchus. These genera are known the Late Triassic to the Early Jurassic. All of these genera are part of the Sphenosuchia clade, have similar morphology. Sphenosuchia are ancestors to crocodyliformes, which constitute modern crocodilians.
