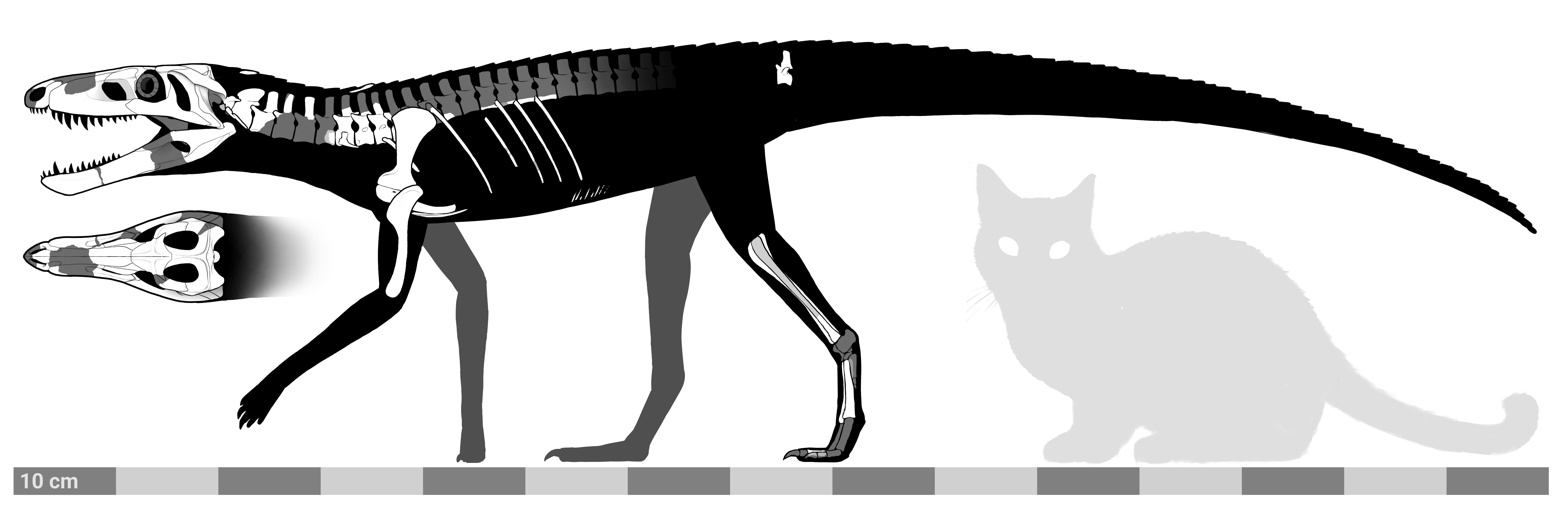
- Skeletal diagram of Sphenosuchus

Scientific classification
- Kingdom: Animalia
- Phylum: Chordata
- Class: Reptilia
- Clade: Pseudosuchia
- Clade: Crocodylomorpha
- Informal group: †Sphenosuchia von Huene, 1942

Genera
- See below

Synonyms
- Pedeticosauria Walker, 1968

= Sphenosuchia =

Sphenosuchia Temporal range: Late Triassic - Late Jurassic, 228–152 Ma
- Life restoration of Hesperosuchus agilis

Suborder of reptiles

Sphenosuchia is a grouping of basal crocodylomorphs that first appeared in the Triassic and persisted into the Jurassic. Most were small, gracile animals with an erect limb posture. Although sometimes recovered as a monophyletic group, they are now generally thought to represent various early offshoots of the lineage leading to Crocodyliformes, with some sphenosuchians more closely related to crocodyliforms than to other "sphenosuchians", rendering the group paraphyletic.

== Stratigraphic range ==
The earliest known members of the group (i.e. Hesperosuchus) are early Norian in age, found in the Blue Mesa Member of the Chinle Formation. Only one sphenosuchian is currently known from the Middle Jurassic, Junggarsuchus, from the Junggar Basin (Shishugou Formation) of China during either the Bathonian or the Callovian (~165 Ma) age, and the Hallopodidae are known from the Late Jurassic of North America.

== Phylogeny ==
The monophyly of the group is debated, although several synapomorphies characterize the clade, including extremely slender limbs, a compact carpus and an elongate coracoid process.

In 2002, Clark and Sues found a possible sphenosuchian clade of Dibothrosuchus, Sphenosuchus, and possibly Hesperosuchus and Saltoposuchus, with several other genera in unresolved positions (Kayentasuchus, Litargosuchus, Pseudhesperosuchus, and Terrestrisuchus). More recently, however, Clark et al. (2004) argued for the paraphyly of the group, contending that morphological characters were secondarily lost in more highly derived crocodylomorphs. Further analysis and study is required before the group's monophyly is resolved with certainty — a perfect phylogenetic analysis is, at present, impossible due to a paucity of fossil remains demonstrating phylogenetically informative characters.

Below is a cladogram modified from Nesbitt (2011). Sphenosuchians are marked by the green bracket.

- Crocodylomorpha
  - CM 73372
  - - Hesperosuchus
    - Dromicosuchus
    - - Sphenosuchus
      - - Dibothrosuchus
        - Terrestrisuchus
        - - Litargosuchus
          - - Kayentasuchus
            - Crocodyliformes
              - Orthosuchus
              - Protosuchus
              - Alligator

=== Genera ===
Genus	Status	Age	Location	Unit	Notes	Images
Dibothrosuchus	Valid	Early Jurassic	China	Lower Lufeng Series		
Dromicosuchus	Valid	Late Triassic	USA	Newark Supergroup		
Dyoplax	Valid	Late Triassic (Carnian)	Germany	Schilfsandstein Formation	A possible sphenosuchian; alternatively, it could be an erpetosuchid.	
Hesperosuchus	Valid	Late Triassic (Carnian)	USA	Chinle Formation		
Junggarsuchus	Valid	Middle Jurassic	China	Shishugou Formation		
Kayentasuchus	Valid	Early Jurassic (Sinemurian - Pliensbachian)	USA	Kayenta Formation		
Litargosuchus	Valid	Early Jurassic	South Africa	Elliot Formation		
Parrishia	Nomen dubium	Late Triassic	USA	Dockum Group	An indeterminate sphenosuchian known only from undiagnostic vertebrae	
Phyllodontosuchus	Valid	Early Jurassic	China	Lower Lufeng Series		
Pseudhesperosuchus	Valid	Late Triassic (Norian)	Argentina	Los Colorados Formation		
Redondavenator	Valid	Late Triassic	USA	Redonda Formation		
Saltoposuchus	Valid	Late Triassic (Norian)	Germany Switzerland UK	Löwenstein Formation Trossingen Formation Lossiemouth Sandstone		
Sphenosuchus	Valid	Early Jurassic	South Africa	Elliot Formation		
Terrestrisuchus	Valid.	Late Triassic	UK			
Trialestes	Valid	Late Triassic	Argentina	Ischigualasto Formation		
