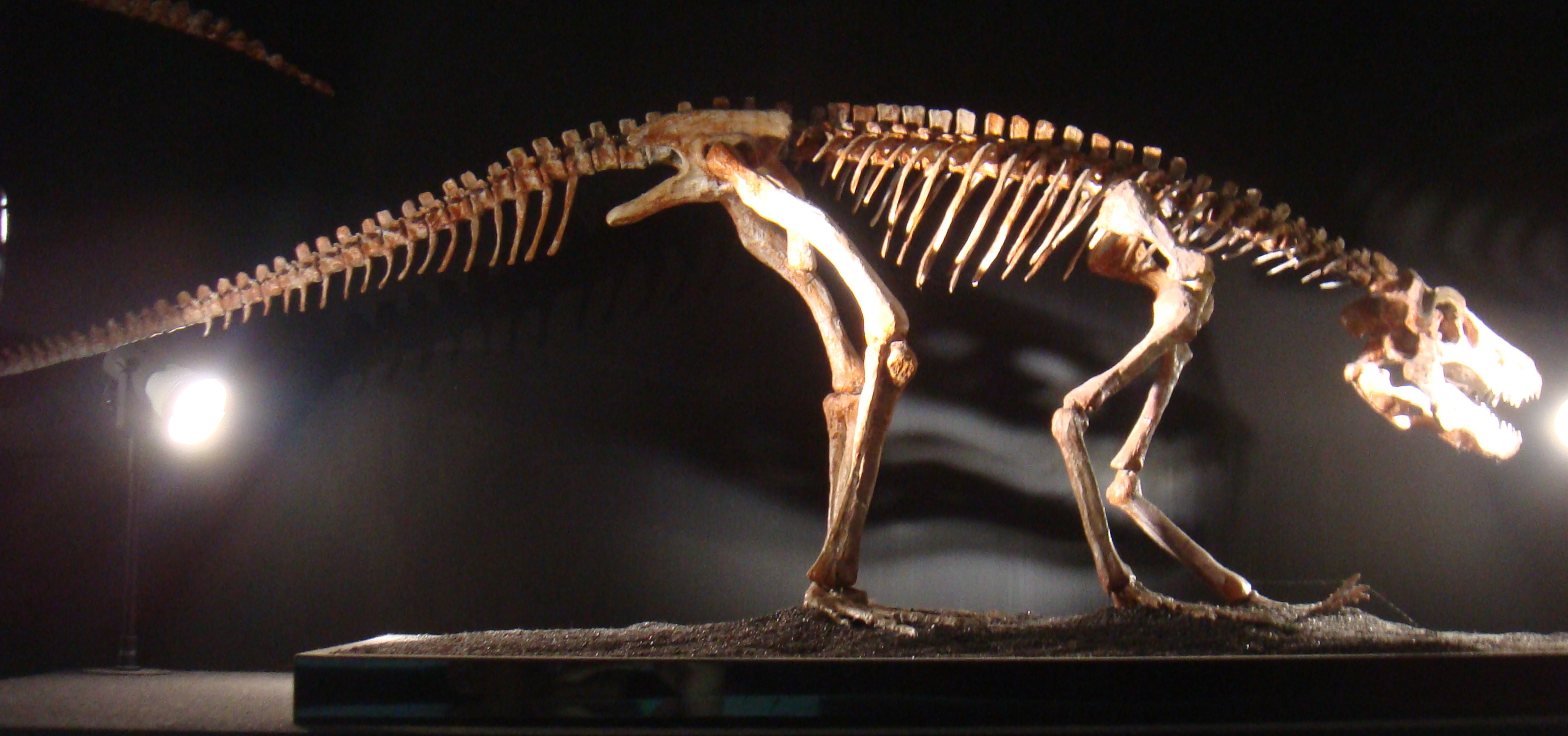
- Restored skeleton

Scientific classification
- Kingdom: Animalia
- Phylum: Chordata
- Class: Reptilia
- Clade: Pseudosuchia
- Clade: Crocodylomorpha
- Genus: †Pseudhesperosuchus; Bonaparte 1969

Species
- P. jachaleri Bonaparte 1969 (type)

= Pseudhesperosuchus =

Pseudhesperosuchus Temporal range: Norian

Extinct genus of reptiles

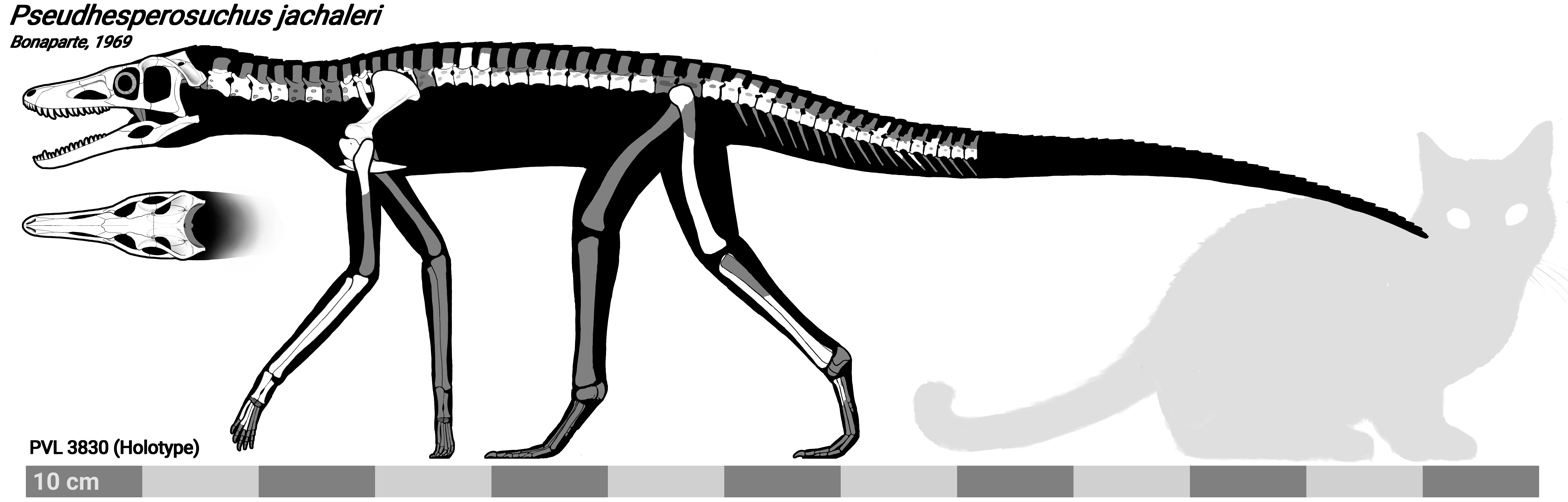
Skeletal diagram, showcasing known elements in white

Pseudhesperosuchus (meaning "false Hesperosuchus") is a genus of sphenosuchian, a type of basal crocodylomorph, the clade that comprises the crocodilians and their closest kin. It is known from a partial skeleton and skull found in rocks of the Late Triassic (Norian-age) Los Colorados Formation of the Ischigualasto-Villa Unión Basin in northwestern Argentina.

== History and description ==
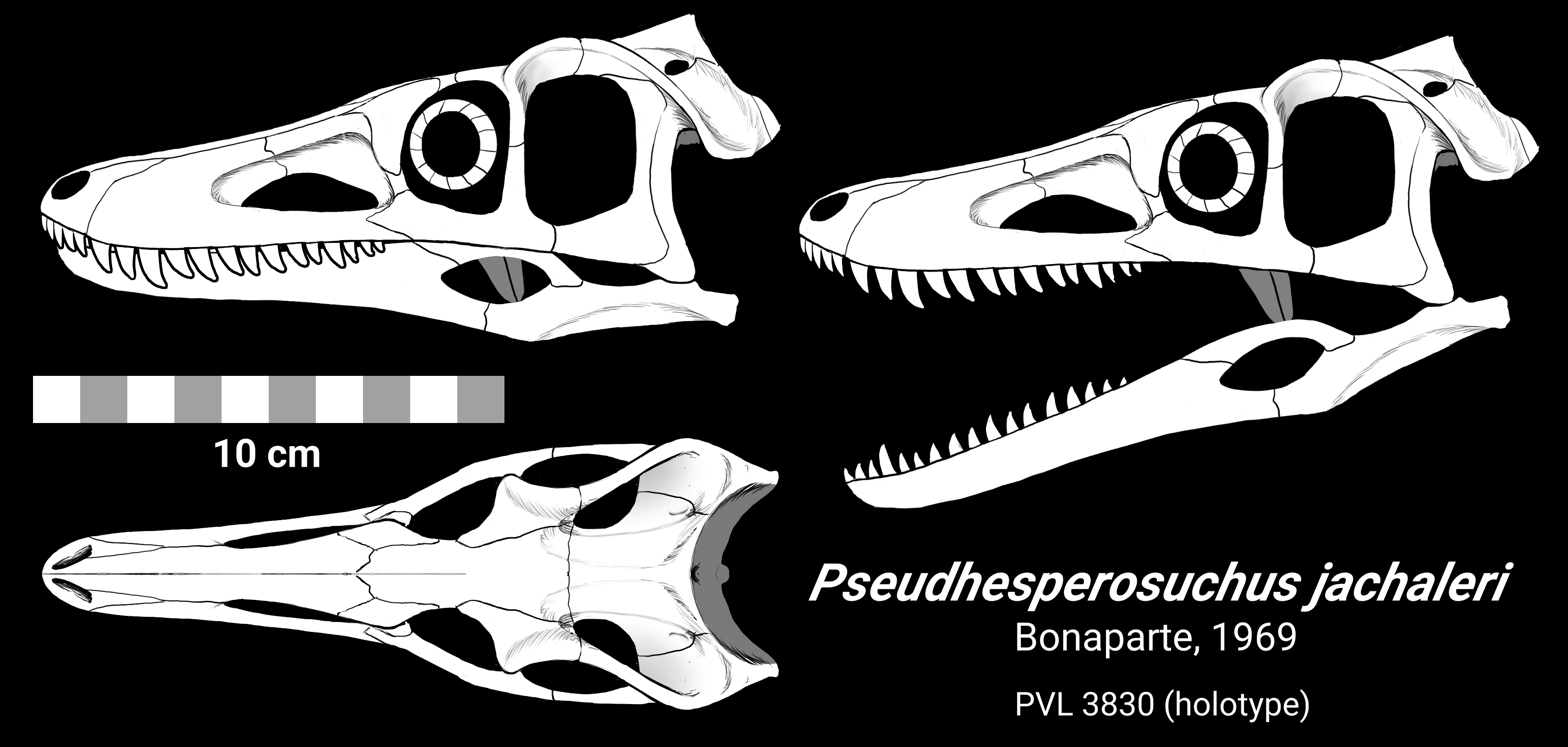
Skull diagram reconstruction, in lateral and dorsal view

Pseudhesperosuchus is based on PVL 3830. This specimen consists of a skull and lower jaws, most of the vertebral column, the shoulder girdle, and parts of the arms and legs. The genus was named by José Bonaparte in 1969, and the holotype was recently redescribed in more detail, which identified the type specimen as inmature due to open neurocentral sutures on its cervical vertebra. The type species is P. jachaleri. The skull, though nearly complete, is poorly preserved, some of its bones and sutures have been misidentified over the years, and additional artificial fenestrae made during preparation have been identified. A 2002 phylogenetic analysis of sphenosuchians performed by James Clark and Hans–Dieter Sues found Pseudhesperosuchus to have an unresolved position along with several other sphenosuchians, neither closer to true crocodiles or to Sphenosuchus. The genus is sometimes misspelled Pseudohesperosuchus, as in Carroll (1988).
