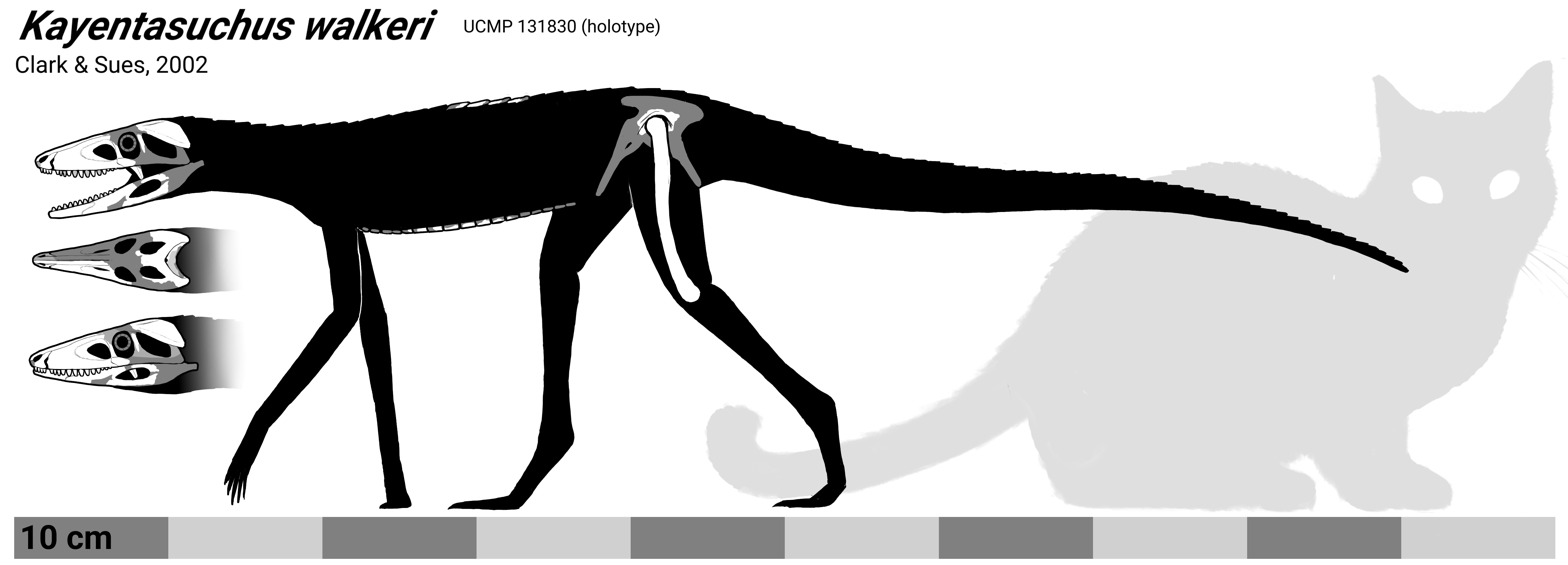
- Skeletal diagram of 𝘒𝘢𝘺𝘦𝘯𝘵𝘢𝘴𝘶𝘤𝘩𝘶𝘴 𝘸𝘢𝘭𝘬𝘦𝘳𝘪, preserved bones in white

Scientific classification
- Kingdom: Animalia
- Phylum: Chordata
- Class: Reptilia
- Clade: Archosauria
- Clade: Pseudosuchia
- Clade: Crocodylomorpha
- Genus: †Kayentasuchus; Clark and Sues, 2002

Type species
- †K. walkeri Clark and Sues, 2002

= Kayentasuchus =

Kayentasuchus Temporal range: Early Jurassic

Extinct genus of reptiles

Kayentasuchus (meaning "Kayenta Formation crocodile") is a genus of sphenosuchian, a type of basal crocodylomorph, the clade that comprises the crocodilians and their closest kin. It is known from a single skeleton found in rocks of the Sinemurian-Pliensbachian-age Lower Jurassic Kayenta Formation, northeastern Arizona.

== History and description ==
Kayentasuchus is based on UCMP 131830, a fragmentary skeleton. UCMP 131830 was known for many years before its description as the "Kayenta Form". It was found in 1983 by James M. Clark. The location was at Willow Springs, 50 kilometres (31 mi) northeast of Flagstaff. The specimen was found in a channel sandstone about halfway up the formation, in the "silty facies". Specimens of the turtle Kayentachelys, the dinosaur Scutellosaurus, and tritylodonts were found in the immediate vicinity a few meters below it.

Kayentasuchus was named in 2002 by Clark and Hans-Dieter Sues. The type species is K. walkeri in memory of Alick Walker, a well-known paleontologist. Most parts of the skeleton are represented, but are fragmentary, and only the skull, lower jaw, pelvis, thigh bone, and bony scutes received detailed description. Kayentasuchus had a tall, narrow snout and a flattened "skull table" at the back of the skull as in more derived crocodyliforms. The lower jaw was slender at the tip and curved upward. The teeth were nearly conical, but had distinct unserrated anterior and posterior edges. Each side of the tip of the upper jaw had four teeth, while the maxillae (main tooth-bearing bone of the upper jaw) and dentaries (tooth-bearing bone of the lower jaw) had twelve or thirteen each. The thigh bones were slender, and there were bony scutes on both the back and belly. The scutes on the upper surface were arranged in two rows running the length of the animal. Clark and Sues performed a phylogenetic analysis and found Kayentasuchus to have an unresolved position along with several other sphenosuchians, neither closer to true crocodiles or to Sphenosuchus.
