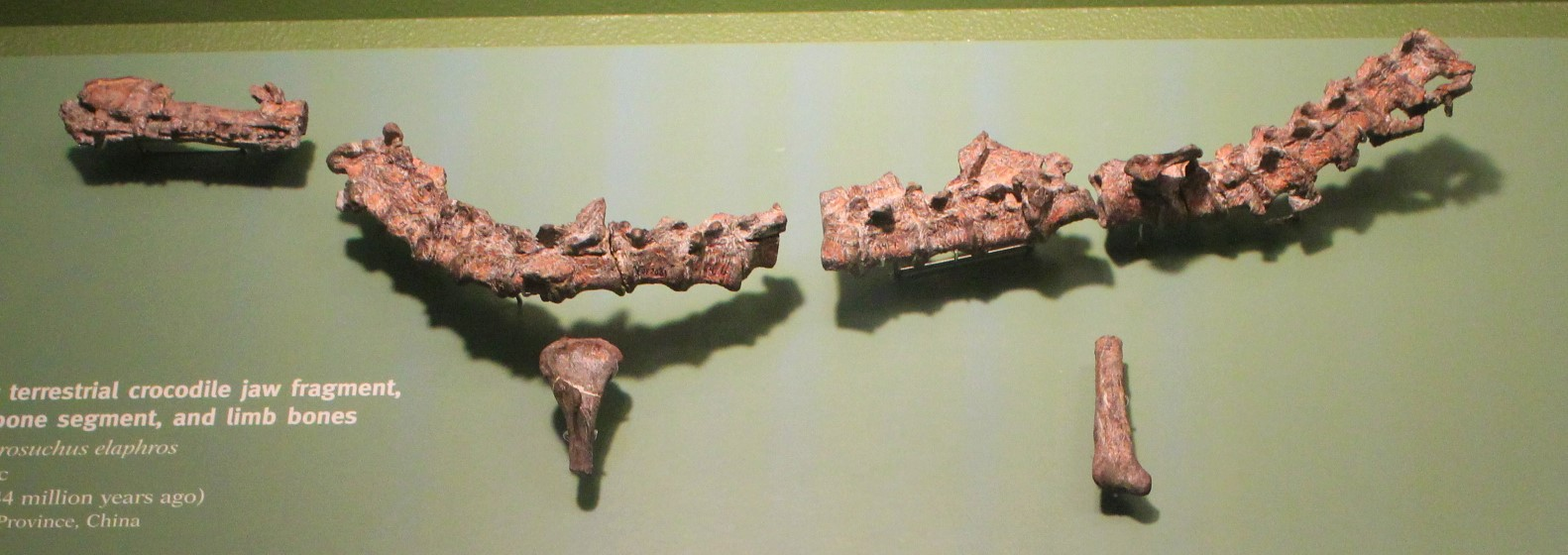
- Vertebrae and limb bones of Dibothrosuchus elaphros in the Field Museum of Natural History
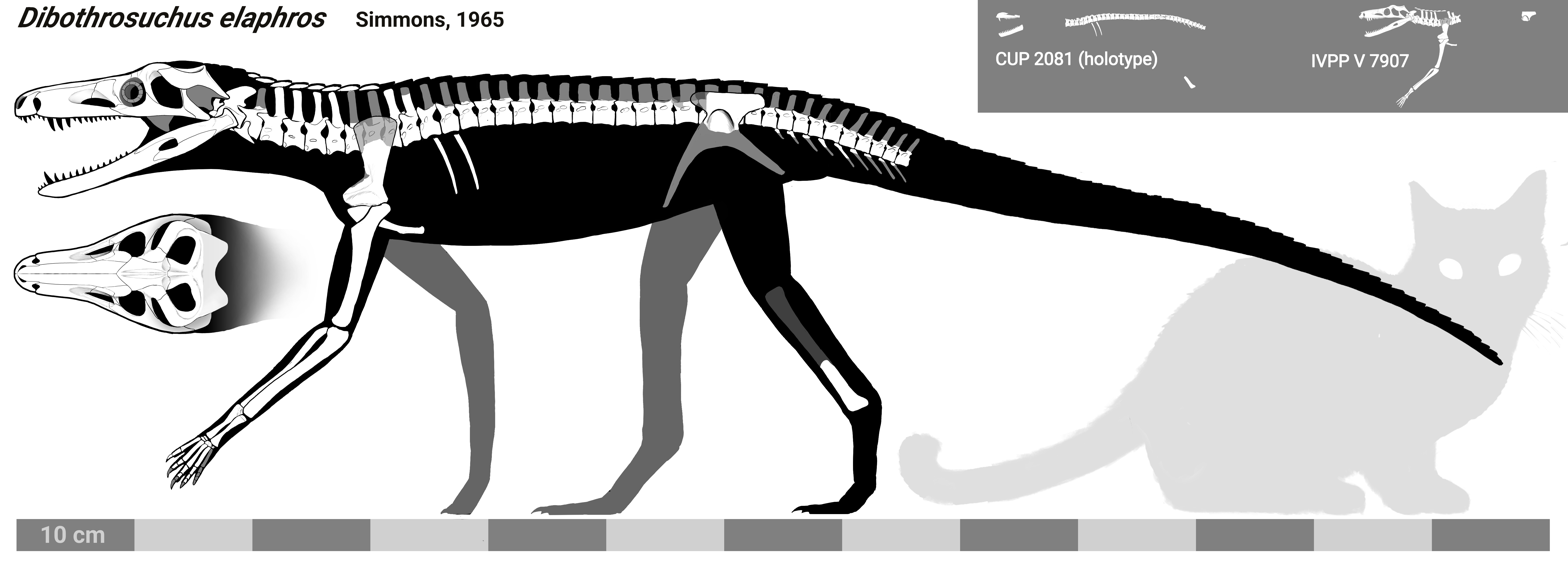
- Skeletal diagram showcasing what is preserved from the holotype, and a referred specimen (known bones in white)

Scientific classification
- Kingdom: Animalia
- Phylum: Chordata
- Class: Reptilia
- Clade: Archosauria
- Clade: Pseudosuchia
- Clade: Crocodylomorpha
- Genus: †Dibothrosuchus; Simmons, 1965

Type species
- †D. elaphros Simmons, 1965

= Dibothrosuchus =

Dibothrosuchus Temporal range: Lower Pliensbachian ~186 Ma

Extinct genus of reptiles

Dibothrosuchus is a genus of sphenosuchian, a type of basal crocodylomorph, the clade that comprises the crocodilians and their closest kin. It is known from several partial skeletons and skulls. These fossils were found in Lower Jurassic (Lower Pliensbachian, circa 186 million years old) rocks of Yunnan, China. Dibothrosuchus was a small terrestrial crocodylomorph that probably had a keen sense of hearing, and thus was probably a vocal animal like modern crocodilians.

== History and description ==
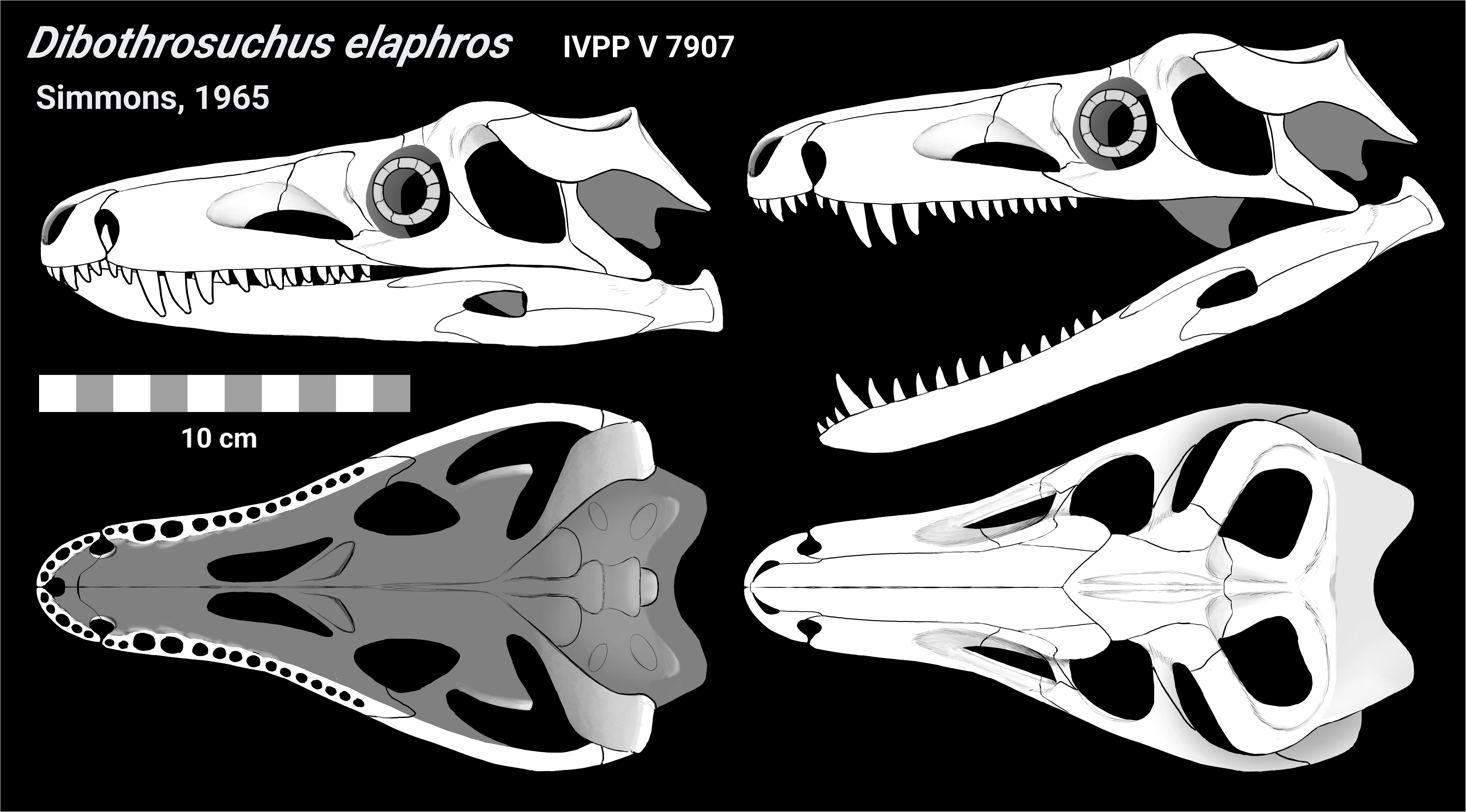
Diagram of the skull

Dibothrosuchus was named in 1965 by D.J. Simmons based on a partial skull and skeleton collected by Father Oehler of Fu Jen Catholic University from mudstones near Huangchiatien. The type species is D. elaphros. Additional remains of this genus were recovered in 1985 by a joint Chinese-US expedition. Fossils of Dibothrosuchus come from the Zhangjiawa Formation, being originally assigned to the Reds Beds of the Lufeng Formation, thus being geologically younger than other crocodylomorphs from the region. At least three partial skeletons and two skulls are known, along with isolated bones. Dibothrosuchus was first described as an ornithosuchid thecodont, but it was later reclassified as a sphenosuchid sphenosuchian. A second species, D. xingsuensis, was named by Wu in 1986. After reexamination of the holotype Wu and Chatterjee found D. xingsuensis to be a synonym of D. elaphros, leaving only one species in the genus.

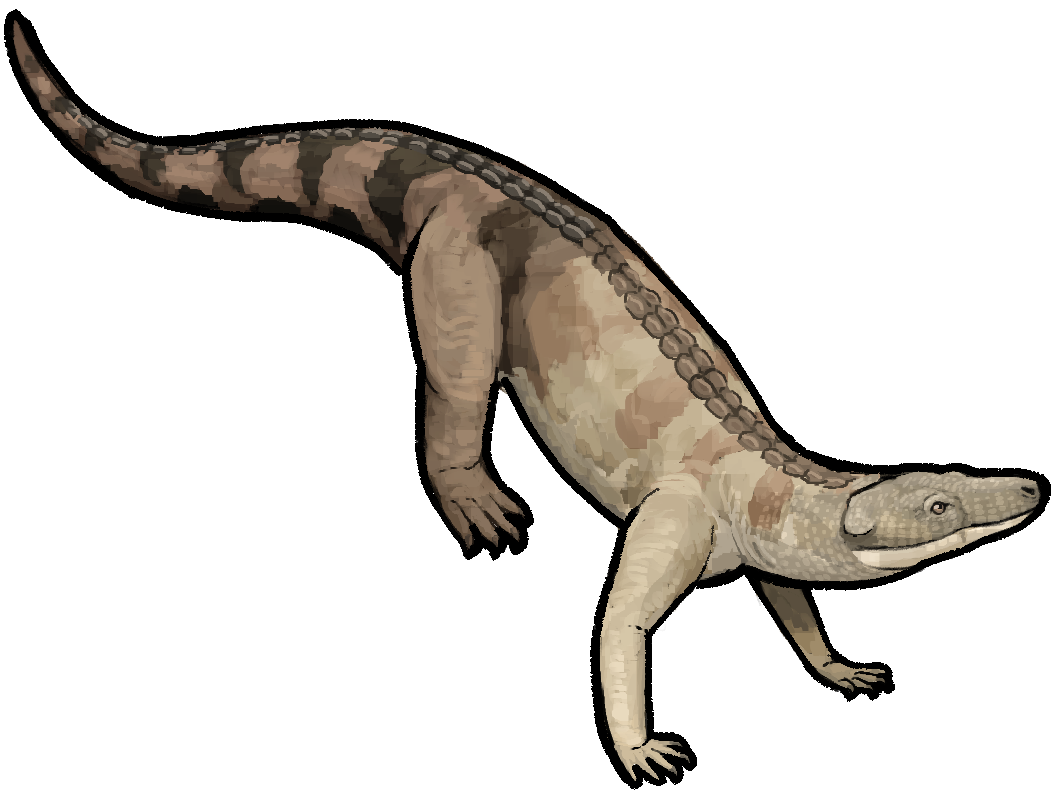
Life restoration of D. elaphros

Dibothrosuchus was not a large animal. From the tip of the snout to the occipital condyle, the skull of IVPP V 7907 is only 164 millimetres (6.5 in) long, and the body length of the individual is estimated as 1.3 metres (4.3 ft). In general form, Dibothrosuchus was a slender, long-tailed and long-limbed quadruped with a pointed snout. Unlike modern crocodilians, it was a terrestrial animal. The upper jaws had five small teeth per premaxilla (snout-tip bones) and seventeen per maxilla, with a small hole between the maxilla and premaxilla for an enlarged tooth in the lower jaw to fit. At least eleven teeth were present on each side of the lower jaw. Several small ridges were present on the top of the skull. The various parts of the skull that supported hearing were well-developed, indicating that Dibothrosuchus had a keen sense of hearing and was probably a vocal animal that could communicate with others of the same genus, like modern crocodilians. Two rows of armor plates ran along the midline of the spine.
