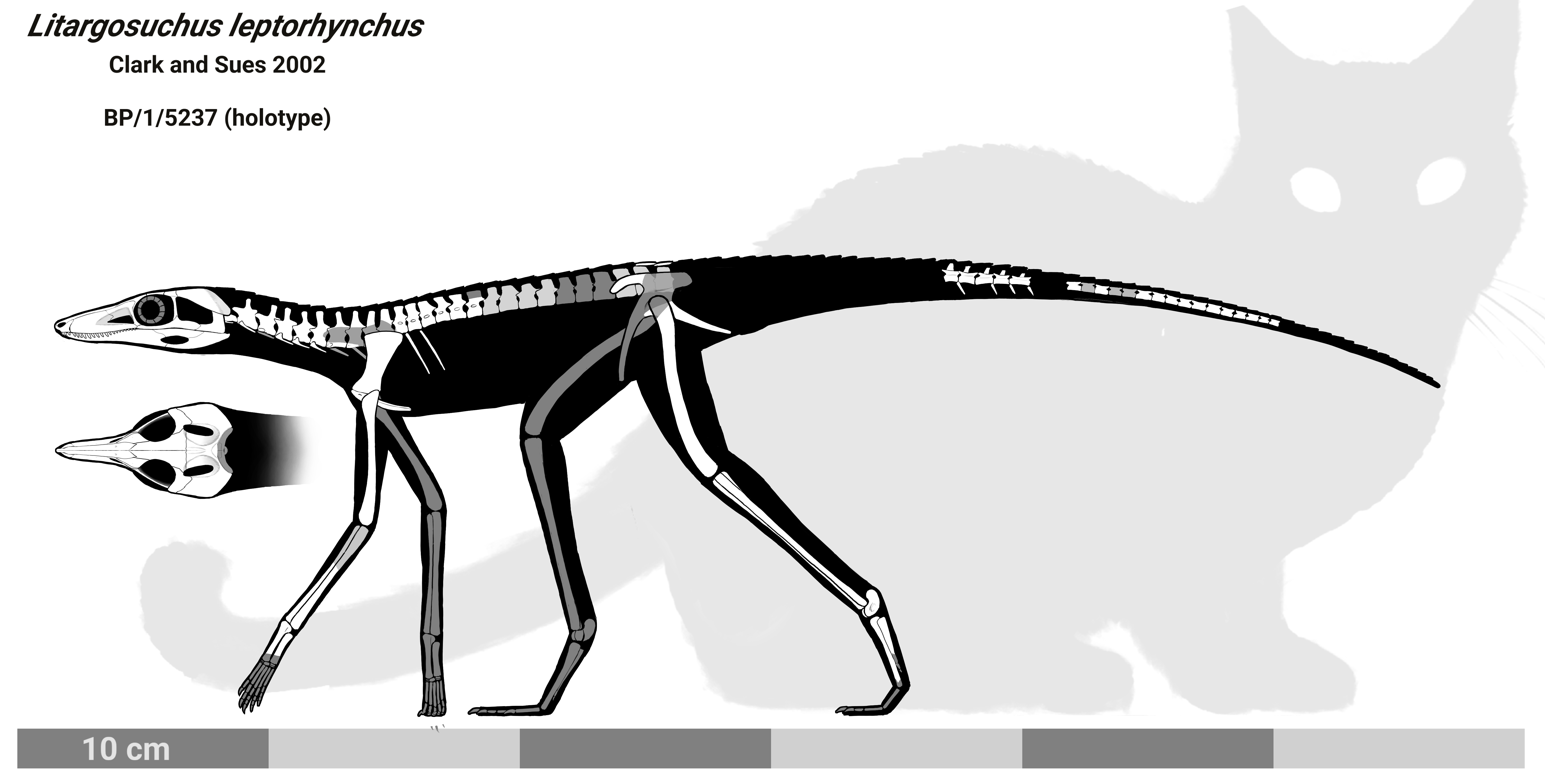
- Skeletal diagram of Litargosuchus
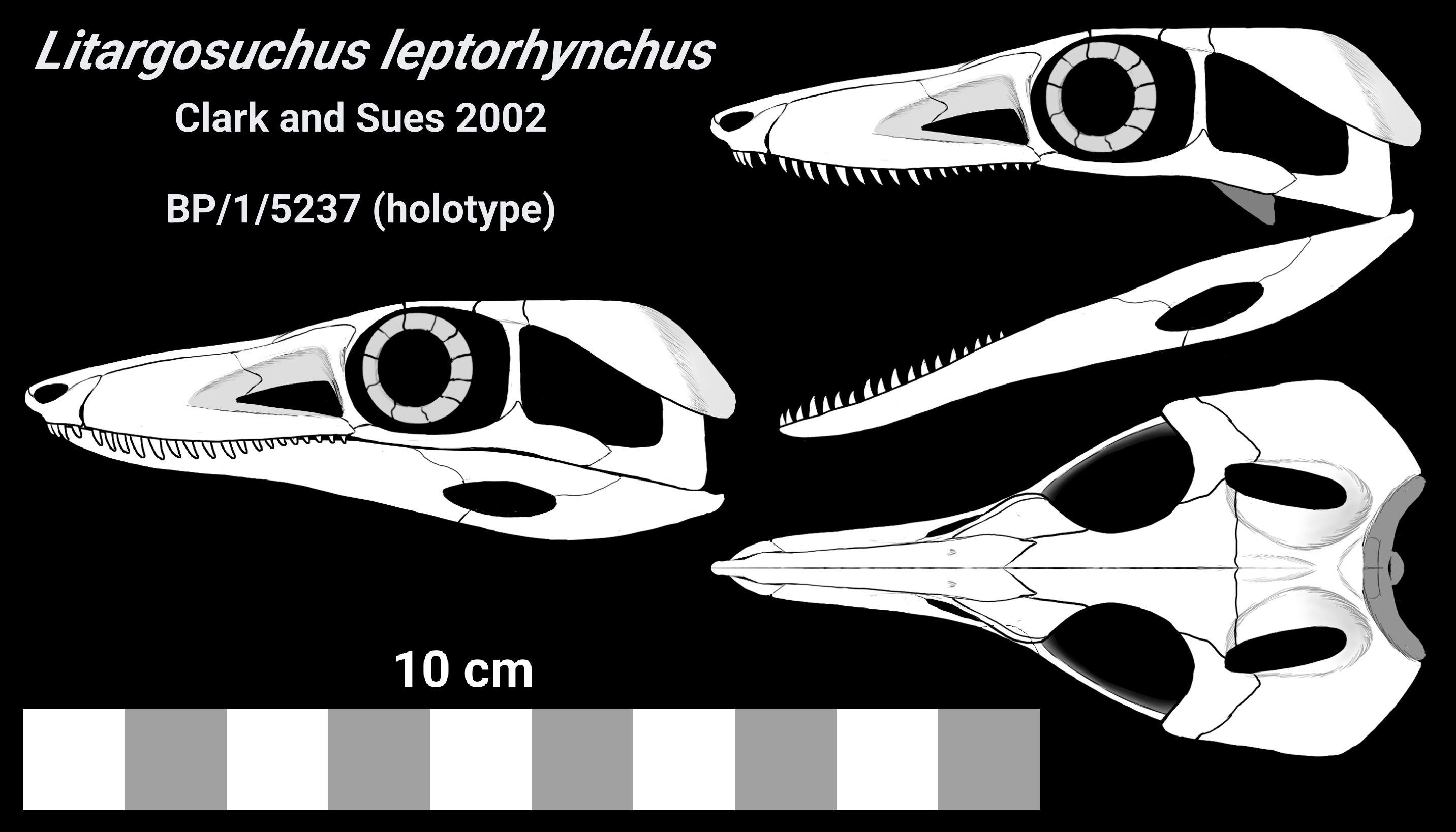
- Restoration of the skull

Scientific classification
- Kingdom: Animalia
- Phylum: Chordata
- Class: Reptilia
- Clade: Pseudosuchia
- Clade: Crocodylomorpha
- Family: †Saltoposuchidae
- Genus: †Litargosuchus; Clark and Sues 2002

Type species
- †L. leptorhynchus Clark and Sues 2002

= Litargosuchus =

Litargosuchus Temporal range: Early Jurassic

Extinct genus of reptiles from the early Jurassic of South Africa

Litargosuchus is a sphenosuchian crocodylomorph, a basal member of the crocodylomorph clade from the Early Jurassic of South Africa. Its genus name Litargosuchus is derived from Greek meaning "fast running crocodile" and its species name leptorhynchus refers to its gracile snout. Litargosuchus, along with all of South Africa's crocodylomorph taxa, are confined to the upper Elliot Formation (UEF) in South Africa.

== History of discovery ==
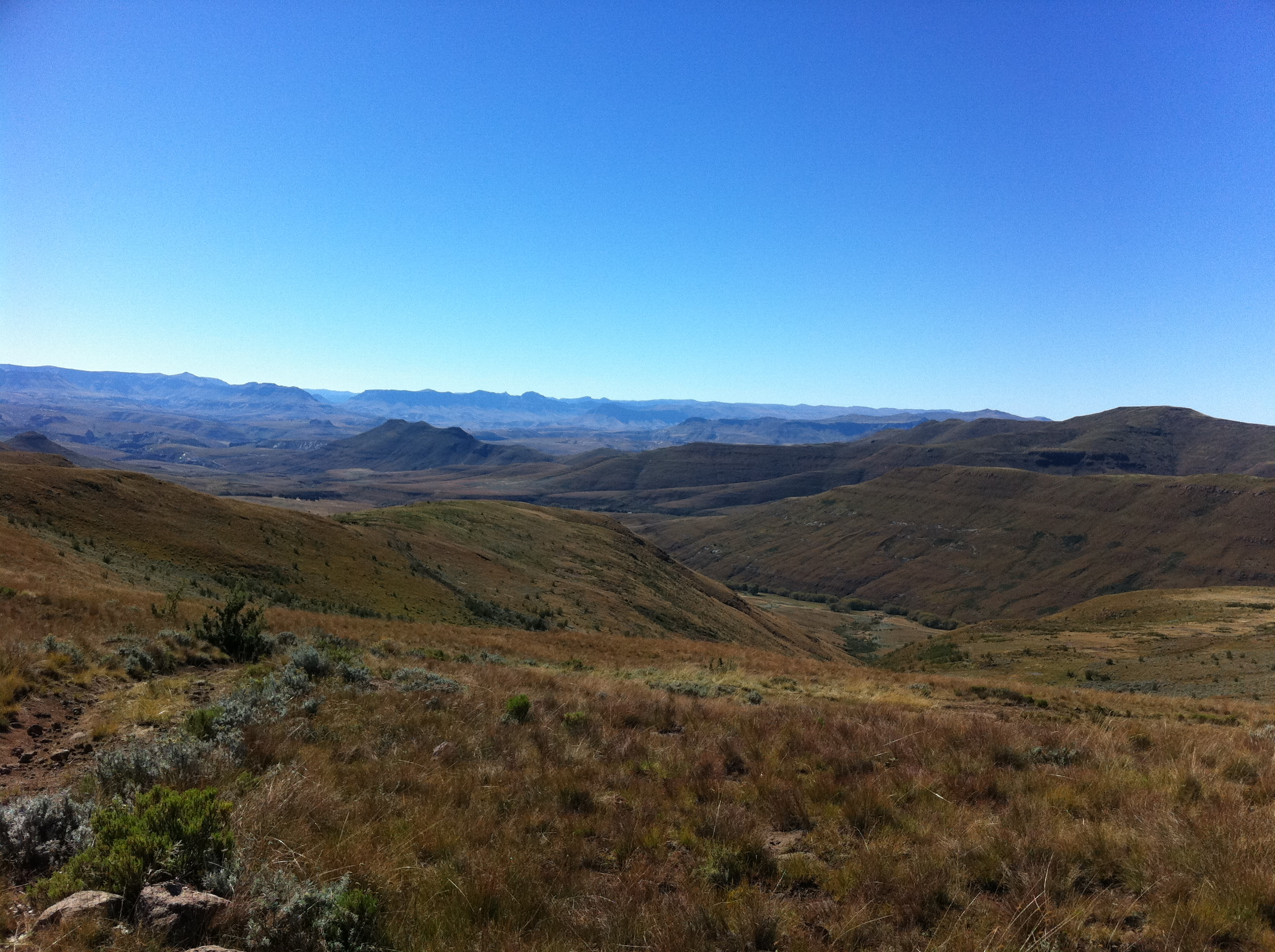
Landscape outside Barkly East, Eastern Cape, South Africa

In 1988 James Kitching found the holotype fossil of Litargosuchus in a field expedition in Eagles Crag, a farm near Barkly East in the Eastern Cape. The material recovered consisted of a near-complete skull with its mandible and several bones belonging to the postcranial skeleton. At the time, Kitching was the director of the Evolutionary Studies Institute (previously the Bernard Price Institute) of the University of the Witwatersrand in Johannesburg. Kitching brought the holotype fossil back to the institute where he described it with fellow researcher, Christopher Gow. Together Kitching and Gow misidentified this new species of sphenosuchian crocodylomorph and assigned the fossils to an existing crocodylomorph species, Pedeticosaurus leviseuri. Over a decade later in 2002, two researchers visiting from abroad, Jim Clark and Hans-Dieter Sues, re-described the fossils. After their analysis, Clark and Sues discovered that the fossils belonged to a new species of sphenosuchian crocodylomorph and coined the current name for the species. The Litargosuchus fossil is monotypic and is the only known fossil of this species that has been found to date.

The skull material of the Litargosuchus holotype was lost and no new fossils have yet been yielded from the Elliot Formation. However, new Litargosuchus fossils may be found in the future. A dedicated research lab based at the Evolutionary Studies Institute has led several field expeditions to localities where Elliot Formation rocks are exposed with the hope of finding more fossil material. Jonah Choiniere, an old PhD student of Clark, leads this research lab. The remains of the holotype currently remain stored at the Evolutionary Studies Institute.

== Description ==
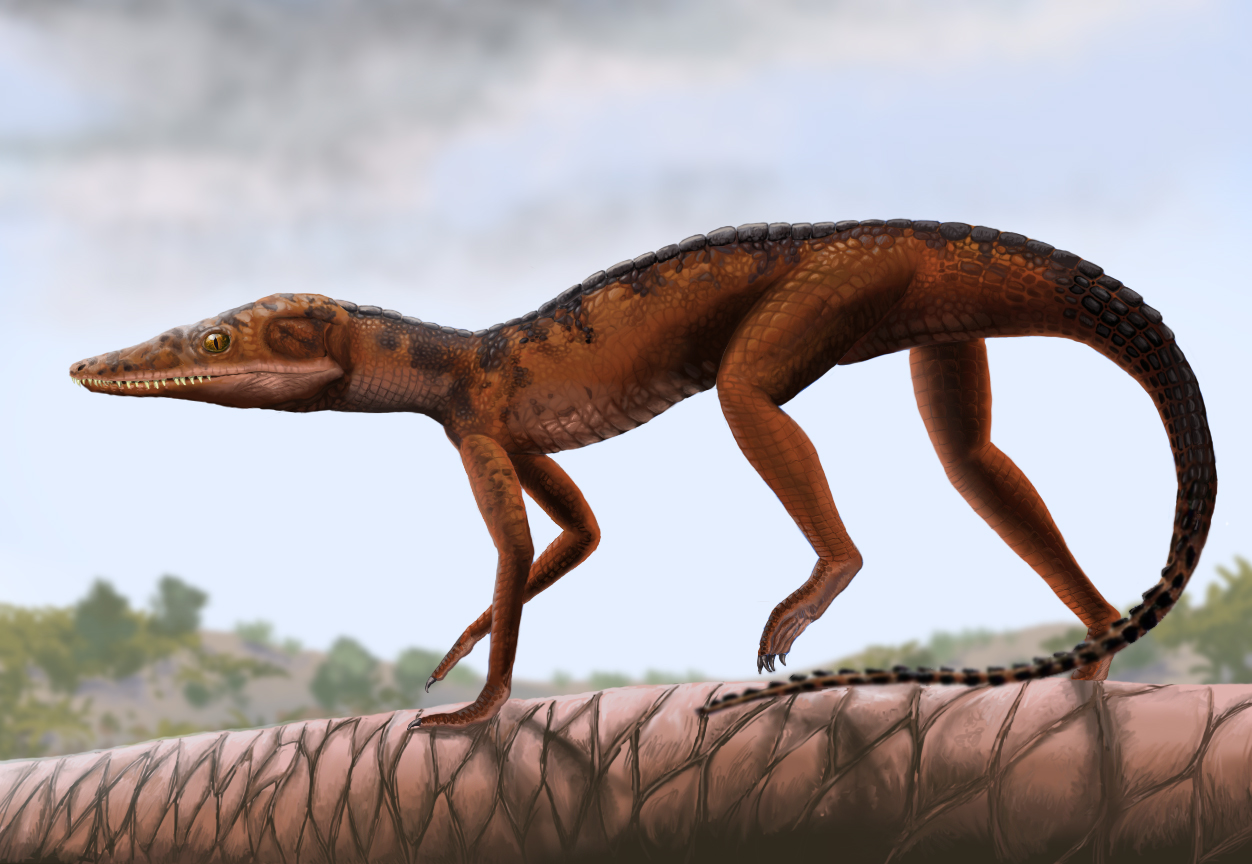
Life restoration

Litargosuchus was a small, gracile non-crocodyliform spheosuchid crocodylomorph restricted to the Sinemurian of the lower Jurassic. Unlike modern crocodiles, Litargosuchus was a cursorial, terrestrial predator. It had unusually elongated limbs with its hind limbs slightly longer than its front. All sphenosuchian crocodylomorphs were lightly built, but Litargosuchus was especially so. It is thought that Litargosuchus pursued its prey much like a wolf; however, Litargosuchus were likely solitary. A cursorial body type is a key character trait of sphenosuchid crocodylomorphs.

== Specimens ==
The holotype specimen, BP/1/5237 is the only documented Litargosuchus specimen recovered to date.

== Classification ==
See Sphenosuchia for details on sphenosuchian phylogeny

Litargosuchus is currently positioned within Sphenosuchidae, a basal clade of non-crocodyliform crocodylomorphs. However, phylogenetic relationships within the Sphenosuchia are poorly understood so its status within this clade is uncertain. In addition, only one specimen of Litargosuchus is known to science, which means that there is no other comparative fossil data with members of its own species. However, it is accepted as a member of the greater crown archosaur clade.
