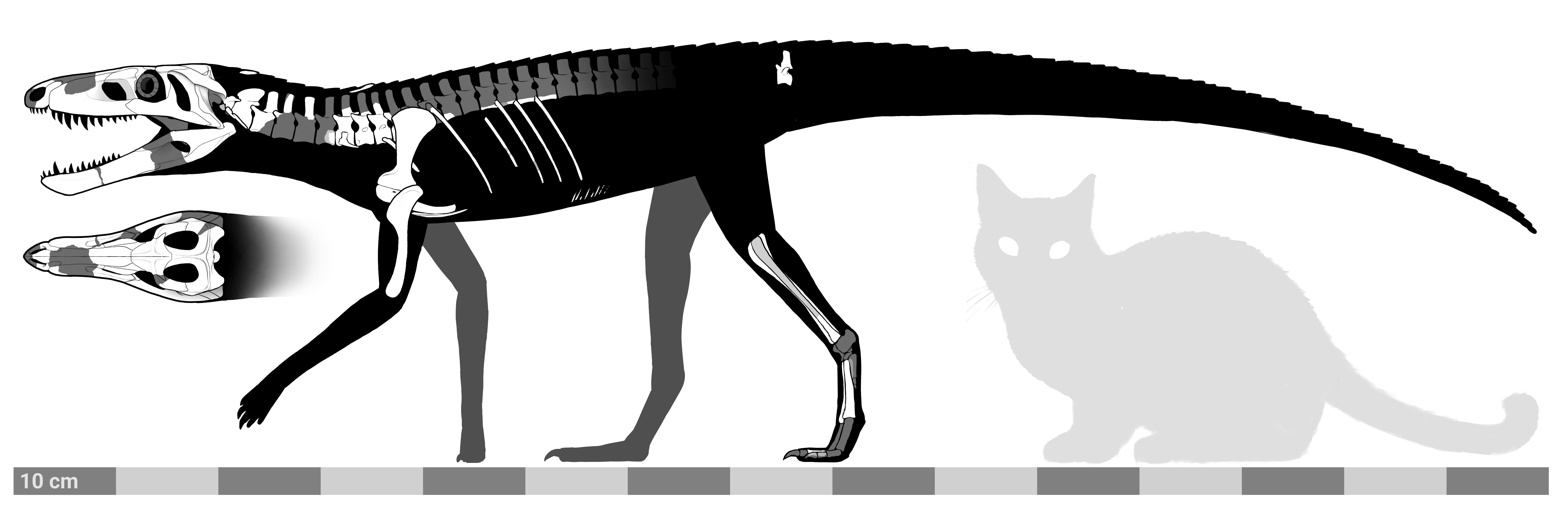
- Skeletal diagram showcasing what is preserved of the holotype
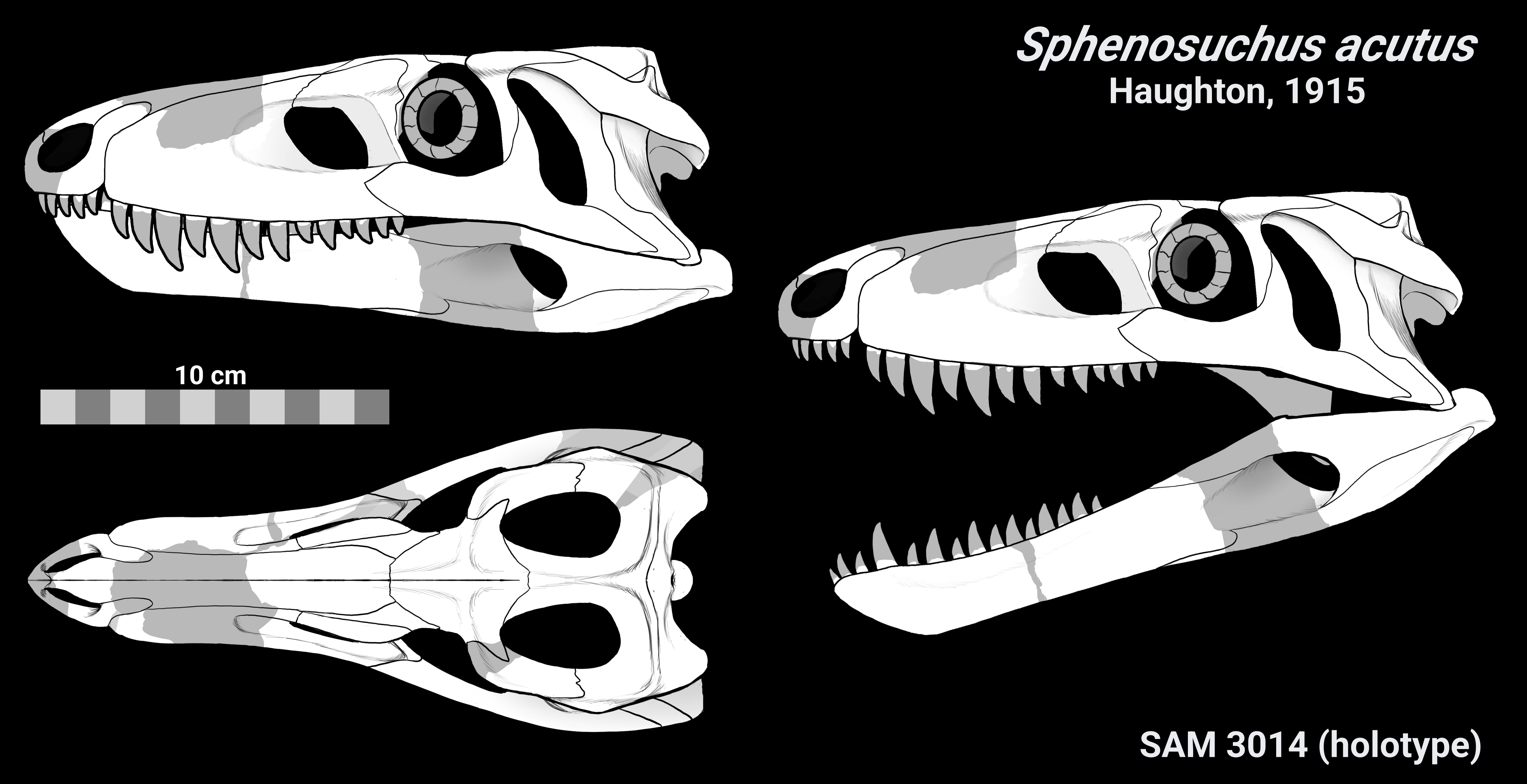
- Diagram of the skull

Scientific classification
- Kingdom: Animalia
- Phylum: Chordata
- Class: Reptilia
- Clade: Archosauria
- Clade: Pseudosuchia
- Clade: Crocodylomorpha
- Genus: †Sphenosuchus; Haughton, 1915
- Species: †S. acutus

Binomial name
- †Sphenosuchus acutus Haughton, 1915

= Sphenosuchus =

Sphenosuchus Temporal range: Early Jurassic ~195 Ma

Extinct genus of reptiles from the early Jurassic of South Africa

Sphenosuchus ("wedge crocodile") is an extinct genus of crocodylomorph from the Early Jurassic Elliot Formation of South Africa, discovered and described early in the 20th century. The skull is preserved very well but other than elements of the forelimb and isolated parts of the hind limb, the Sphenosuchus material is incomplete. It was probably quadrupedal, but may have been a facultative biped.

Sphenosuchus was first thoroughly described in 1972 by the British palaeontologist Alick Walker, in a paper in the journal Nature. Walker suggested, based on detailed (but still preliminary at that time) studies of the skull of Sphenosuchus and modern birds, that crocodylomorphs and birds might share an immediate common ancestor. Walker recanted his hypothesis in 1985, but restated and elaborated on it (in essence 'de-recanting') in a monograph published in 1990, which provided the most comprehensive description and discussion of Sphenosuchus yet published.

Broom believed, in 1927, with the evidence present in the specimens, that Sphenosuchus is a pseudosuchian which is well along the line that leads to the true crocodiles.

In a paper published by Friedrich von Huene, he emphasizes Sphenosuchus as a very important stage of crocodile evolution.

== Species ==
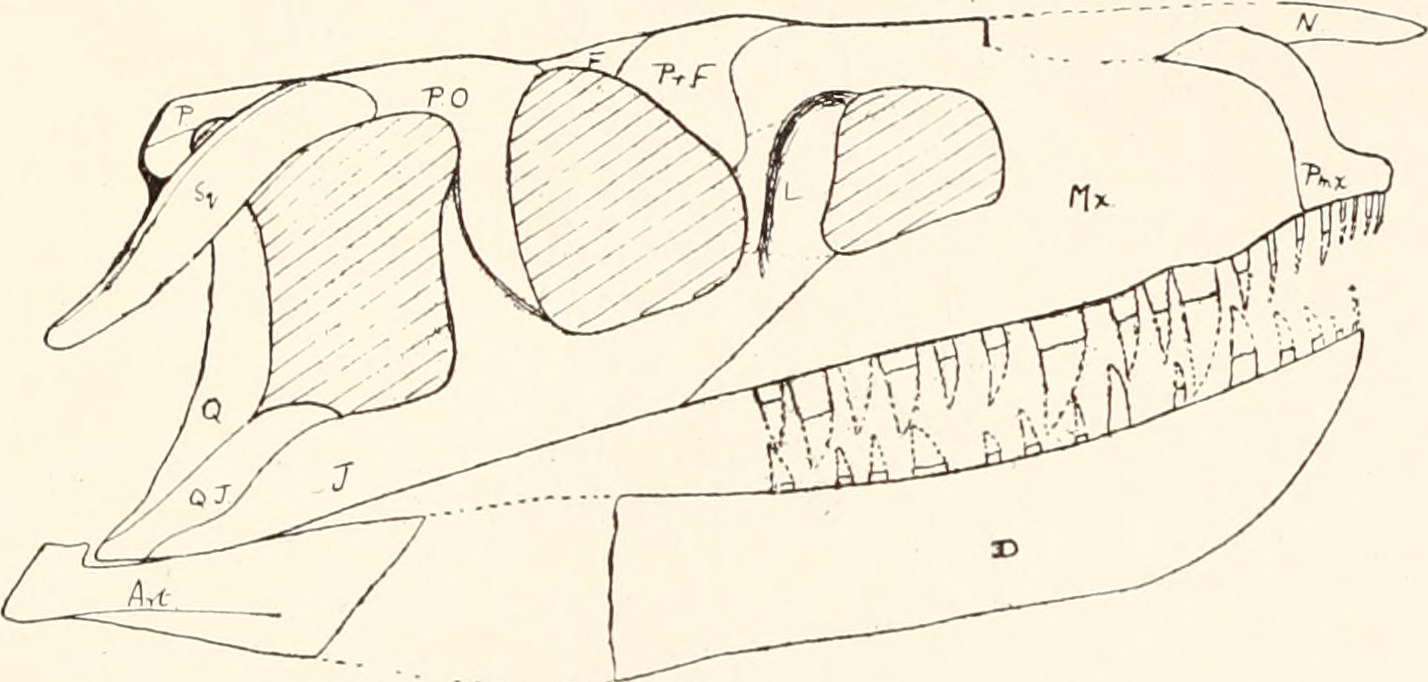
Sideview of Sphenosuchus acutus skull as portrayed by the South African Museum

The type species, Sphenosuchus acutus is the only described species in this genus.

== Description ==
Out of the early crocodylomorphs, Sphenosuchus was one of the largest. The skull was 192 millimetres (7.6 in) in the length and the body an estimated total length of 1.4 metres (4 ft 7 in). This genus is considered to have been carnivorous and cursorial. The found specimen consists of a nearly perfect but slightly crushed skull, a shoulder girdle, and a few limb bones so most of the known features come from the skull. The primary head of the quadrate meets the prootic and squamosal. The quadrate and pterygoid are not fused to the braincase and the basipterygoid articulation is free. The dentary is not gracile and has anterior swelling. The parietals are fused together. The post temporal fenestrae are known for the Sphenosuchus with the sizes being very variable among early archosaurs but rather small in size for Sphenosuchus Has a scapula blade in a triangular shape. No clavicles present. Metatarsal I is reduced, II and IV are symmetrical and III is the longest. The nasals are long and narrow and pass from near the plane passing through the front of the orbits to the extreme anterior points of the snout. The frontals are large relatively and help to form a small part of the upper orbital margin and a large portion of the upper temporal fossa. The jugal is a large bone forming the whole of the lower orbital and almost all of the lower temporal bar. The parietal is a good sized element forming nearly the entire intertemporal region along with the majority of the occiput. There is no parietal foramen present. The dentary is slender and moderate in length, it appears to have roughly fourteen teeth with a third of them being larger than the others. Overall the skull is similar to those of crocodiles however it is slightly deeper.

From one of the forelimbs it appears that Sphenosuchus has a carpus with the radius and ulna elongated and metacarpal like in structure.

== Specimens ==
A new specimen of Hesperosuchus agilis was found from the Upper Triassic of New Mexico. According to Colbert Hesperosuchus is in a close relationship with Sphenosuchus and this assessment has been widely accepted since. There are several physical similarities between the two. The maxilla of the specimen lacks a lateral lamina that would conceal the medial wall of the fossa in lateral view similar to Sphenosuchus. The quadrate is similar as well in that it has a distinct lateral ridge along the anterior margin.

Another new specimen of an early crocodylomorph was found in Arizona at the Petrified Forest National Park from the Upper Triassic. A major synapomorphy shared by the specimen and Sphenosuchus is the swelling of the anterior end of the dentary. Parrish and his team constructed 27 parsimonious trees and in every one the new specimen was placed as the sister group to Sphenosuchus. The specimen was rather incomplete therefore if more of the fossil is to be found this could be subject to revision. Also there is a slight issue with the synapomorphy that relates the two so closely. The swelling of the denture could be in part an ontogenetic feature. However the lack of this feature in the other specimens up for debate to be related to the specimen suggests that is in fact phylogenetically significant.

== Classification ==
In Alick Walker's first paper looking at the origin of birds and crocodiles it is suggested that they could in fact have a close common ancestor with Sphenosuchus. The evidence being similarities in several features including: quadrate articulation, inner ear regions, pneumatic spaces connected with the middle ear, the palatal structure, occiput and odd basipterygoid process, and the upper temporal bar positioning in the skull. According to these findings Walker thought that the conclusion that birds and crocodiles could be more closely related than previously thought could not be ignored.

In 1990 Walker revised his previous work with a new, more comprehensive paper regarding Sphenosuchus and the relationship with modern crocodiles and birds. Several homologies were discussed. Main cavities in the crocodilian skull are also present in Sphenosuchus, sometimes in a less clearly defined state. Certain pneumatic spaces in the Sphenosuchus skulls are not found in modern crocodiles but are of closer resemblance to cavities in the bird skull. The otic capsule of Sphenosuchus closely resembles those of birds and crocodiles. Modern crocodiles' heads are in the same morphological position as in Sphenosuchus although reduced in comparison. Due to these homologies Walker concludes that the most important steps of crocodylomorph evolution, especially the skull, took place in Sphenosuchia and therefore they should be included in the same taxon as Protosuchia.

In 1995 Johann Welman published a paper "Euparkeria and the origin of birds". where he argues that while Sphenosuchus had been thought to potentially be related to birds he finds the brain case structures of Sphenosuchus to be too specialized to be the sister group of birds. Another feature he found to be different was the eustachian system. Crocodiles and Sphenosuchus have a median eustachian system while birds do not. The internal carotid arteries in birds run on the lateral sides of the basiparaspehnoid while in Sphenosuchus arteries are more or less parallel in ventral view. Also in Sphenosuchus the facial nerve exits anteriorly to the otic capsule which is much more derived than birds; birds facial nerve passes between the two parts of the otic capsules.

Welman finds that the evidence he presented makes it clear that crocodilomorphs are too specialized in a number of key characteristics to be closely related to birds.
