= Pant-y-Ffynnon Quarry =

Stone quarry in Wales

Pant-y-Ffynnon Quarry fissure fills
- Stratigraphic range: Rhaetian, ~215–201 Ma
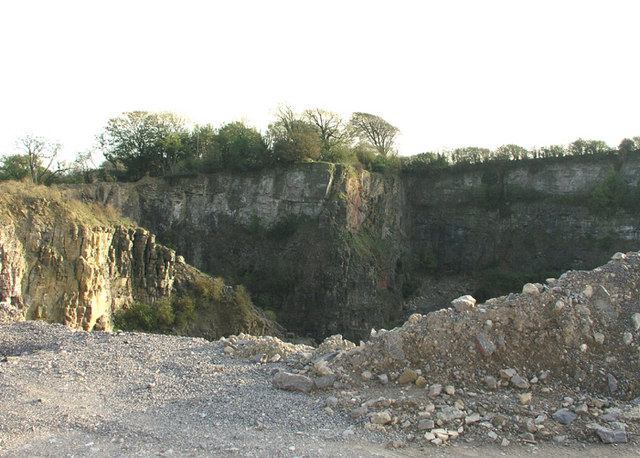
- The Pant-y-Ffynnon Quarry in 2006
- Type: Fissure fill
- Overlies: Friars Point Limestone Formation

Lithology
- Primary: Breccia

Location
- Coordinates: 51.458°N 03.374°W
- Region: South Wales
- Country: Wales
- Pant-y-Ffynnon Quarry (Wales)

Pant-y-Ffynnon Quarry is a stone quarry in the Vale of Glamorgan, Wales, around 3 kilometers east of Cowbridge and is part of the Black Mountain mountain range. It contains fissure fill deposits dating to the Late Triassic (Rhaetian), hosted within karsts of Carboniferous aged limestone, primarily the Friars Point Limestone Formation. Remains of numerous small vertebrates, notably archosaurs, are known from the fissure fills in the quarry, similar to other Late Triassic-Early Jurassic fissure fill deposits known from Southwest England and southern Wales.

== History ==
The quarry was likely in use since at least the 1910s, and the first fossil specimens discovered at the quarry were collected by palaeontologists Kenneth Kermack and Pamela Robinson of University College London between 1951 and 1952, and were first presented at a talk in 1953 and later written on briefly in 1956.

The quarry was abandoned during the 1960s and few fossil discoveries have been made there since. Much of the remains discovered between 1951 and 1952 were left undescribed until the 21st century, with most only initially being briefly described upon discovery.

== Vertebrate paleofauna ==
Taxon	Species	Presence	Notes	Images
Aenigmaspina	A. pantyffynnonensis	Geographically present in Pantyffynnon	Remains include osteoderms, vertebrae, ribs and a scapula clustered tightly together, as well as more pieces from the forelimb and additional vertebrae that likely belong to this individual. Nicknamed 'Edgar'.	
Clevosaurus	C. cambrica, C. sp.	Geographically present in Pantyffynnon	Partial cranial and post-cranial remains from several specimens, with bite marks belonging to Terrestrisuchus present.	
Crinoidea	Indeterminate	Geographically present in Pantyffynnon	Reworked from older Carboniferous sediments.	
Crocodylomorpha	Indeterminate	Geographically present in Pantyffynnon	Isolated bones associated with the holotype of Pendraig. Likely the same animal as Terrestrisuchus	
Diphydontosaurus	D. sp.	Geographically present in Pantyffynnon	Left dentary.	
Kuehneosaurus	K. sp.	Geographically present in Pantyffynnon	Indeterminate remains, with Keeble et al. (2018) unable to source this specimen.	
Lepidosauria	Indeterminate	Geographically present in Pantyffynnon	Indeterminate remains.	
Pantydraco	P. caducus	Geographically present in Pantyffynnon	Remains include a skull, a partial jawbone, and vertebrae of the cervix, an incomplete right pelvic bone, and partial forelimbs.	
Pendraig	P. milnerae	Geographically present in Pantyffynnon	Remains include a partial pelvis, vertebrae and a left femur that is from the same individual was found disarticulated from the main block.	
Rhynchocephalia	Indeterminate	Geographically present in Pantyffynnon	Represented by one or two indeterminate species.	
Terrestrisuchus	T. gracilis, T. sp.?	Geographically present in Pantyffynnon	Several well-preserved articulated partial skeletons and various isolated bones.	
