= Aenigmaspina =

Aenigmaspina Temporal range: Late Triassic, ~Rhaetian

Scientific classification
- Kingdom: Animalia
- Phylum: Chordata
- Class: Reptilia
- Clade: Archosauria
- Clade: Pseudosuchia
- Family: †Ornithosuchidae (?)
- Genus: †Aenigmaspina; Patrick et al. 2019
- Species: †A. pantyffynnonensis

Binomial name
- †Aenigmaspina pantyffynnonensis Patrick et al. 2019

Extinct genus of reptiles

Aenigmaspina (from Latin aenigma and spina, meaning "enigmatic spine") is an extinct genus of enigmatic pseudosuchian (=crurotarsan) archosaur from the Late Triassic of the United Kingdom. Its fossils are known from the Pant-y-ffynnon Quarry in South Wales, of which its type and only known species is named after, A. pantyffynnonensis. Aenigmaspina is characterised by the unusual spines on its vertebrae, which are broad and flat on top with a unique 'Y' shape. Although parts of its skeleton is relatively well known, the affinities of Aenigmaspina to other pseudosuchians are unclear, although it is possibly related to families Ornithosuchidae, Erpetosuchidae or Gracilisuchidae.

== Description ==
Aenigmaspina was a small (<1 m long) archosaur with a slender skeleton and build. It is mostly known from the front half of its body, including its vertebral column, ribs, shoulder and parts of the forelimb, as well as possibly pieces of skull and pelvis that may belong to it.

The vertebrae of Aenigmaspina are its most distinctive feature. These are characterised by their spine tables, where the tops of the neural spines split into a broad 'V' shape with a deep groove between them. In the cervicals of the neck, each leaf of the table is angled up at 45° and forms a roughly rectangular shape from above, while those of the dorsals are flatter and the table is more shield-shaped, with a straight front edge and pointed at the back. These Y-shaped neural spines are only found in the cervicals and first four dorsals, behind them the neural spines are only slightly expanded at their tips and became more slender down the spine.

Nine osteoderms are known, forming a single row running down the spine that split into two long pointed spines at the back with smooth, thin surfaces. The osteoderms of other archosaurs are usually found in a paired row, and the symmetrical shape with two pointed spines (as well as furrows and notches on the midline of some) suggests they are actually fused pairs of osteoderms. The osteoderms also sport keels on their underside that lock neatly into the furrow in their vertebrae, which could suggest the osteoderms were restricted to the neck and front-most section of the back as the Y-shaped spine tables are not found past the 4th dorsal vertebra. This would be unusual, but not completely unprecedented as some pseudosuchians (particularly ornithosuchids) are known to have only had osteoderms in front of the hips, although not to the extent in Aenigmaspina.

The scapula is very long and slender with little curve along its length, suggesting a tall, narrow body shape. The glenoid (shoulder joint) faces down and slightly back, suggesting upright forelimbs. The humerus and ulna are both very long and slender, and the ulna is noticeably longer than the humerus. They are similarly proportioned to those of the contemporary long-legged crocodylomorph Terrestrisuchus but differs in having a rounded deltopectoral crest at the very top of the humerus. A pelvis that may belong to Aenigmaspina is lightly built, with slender pubes and ischia and an ilium with a long, pointed backwards process and deep hip socket (acetabulum).

If the few known skull elements are correctly referred to Aenigmaspina, the parietal bone suggests that the roof of its skull may have been flat and roughly textured.

== History of discovery ==
Aenigmaspina was collected from Pant-y-ffynnon quarry in South Wales, a quarry of Carboniferous limestone that contains fissures filled with Triassic-Early Jurassic aged sediment, from which Aenigmaspina and other Triassic-aged reptiles are known from. The exact age of the fissures is uncertain, but a latest Triassic Rhaetian age has been suggested based on biostratigraphy between the Pant-y-ffynnon fissures and other similar sites. The specimens were collected by palaeontologists Kenneth Kermack and Pamela Robinson of University College London between 1951 and 1952, along with four other species of reptile, and were first presented at a talk in 1953 and later written on briefly in 1956 where the specimen was informally nicknamed 'Edgar'. The specimen would eventually be fully described and formally named as part of a thesis by Erin Patrick and published in 2019.

At least one individual of Aenigmaspina is definitively known. This individual, 'Edgar', consists of a pair of split blocks (the holotype NHMUK P9/3a) that together contain osteoderms, vertebrae, ribs and a scapula clustered tightly together, as well as more pieces from the forelimb and additional vertebrae that likely belong to this individual. The specimen was found tightly curled up, possibly because the animal died in a burrow before being preserved. This specimen was CT scanned to examine details of the bones more closely without risking further damage to the fossil. Other isolated pieces, including pieces of skull and a pelvis, may belong to Aenigmaspina, however, because they are labelled similarly to fossils of other species from Pant-y-ffynnon their identity cannot be confirmed in isolation. Nonetheless, they do show similarities in both size and form (i.e. slender limbed), although some must come from at least one other individual based on duplicated bones from the forelimb.

A single vertebra from a quarry in Cromhall in South Gloucestershire, England closely matches the cervicals of Aenigmaspina, including what appears to be the Y-shaped spine table.

The generic name, from the Latin aenigma for "enigma" or "puzzle" and spina for "spine", was chosen to refer to the difficulty of identifying the fossil pieces belonging to it and its uncertain evolutionary relationships, and also for its uniquely characteristic spine tables on its vertebrae. The species name is from the Pant-y-ffynnon (Welsh 'spring in a hollow') quarry, where it was found. The specimens of Aenigmaspina are all stored in the Natural History Museum, London, UK.

== Classification ==
The affinities of Aenigmaspina to other archosaurs is, as the name suggests, enigmatic. It has been identified as a crurotarsan (pseudosuchian) archosaur from its short cervicals, short cervical ribs, and broad spine tables with associated osteoderms, as opposed to an avemetatarsalian. However, it does not preserve any unique traits (autapomorphies) that would ally it with any known major group of pseudosuchians. Despite this, it has been determined to unlikely be a phytosaur, aetosaur, 'rauisuchian' or a crocodylomorph, as it either shares no traits with them or is much smaller than would be expected for these forms.

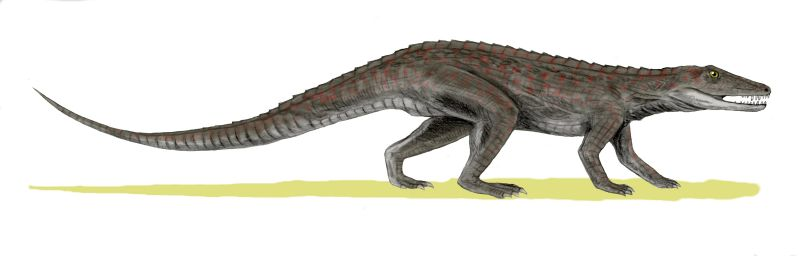
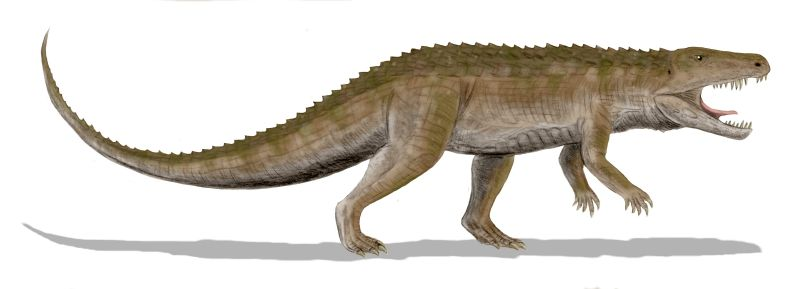
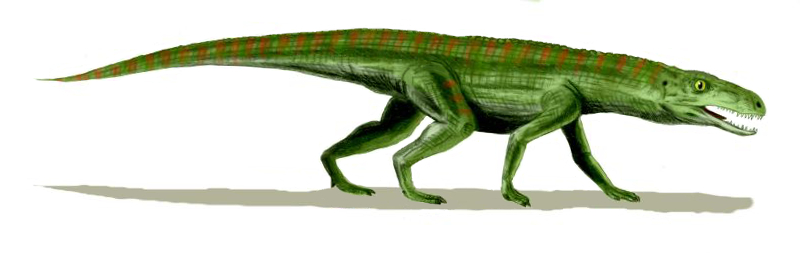
Possible relatives of Aenigmaspina could be Erpetosuchus, Ornithosuchus and Gracilisuchus.

Its relationships were tested using two phylogenetic analyses, one based on Ezcurra (2016) and another from Ezcurra et al. (2017), however this resulted in similarly unclear results, and only showed weak affinities to the basal pseudosuchian Ornithosuchidae in the former and surprisingly to the non-archosaur archosauromorph Proterochampsia in the latter. Indeed, even after the trees were modified by removing unstable taxa, Aenigmaspina remained paired with the proterochampsian Rhadinosuchus despite being removed from all other proterochampsians and allied with Ornithosuchidae (shown in the cladogram below).

- Ornithosuchidae
  - - Rhadinosuchus
    - Aenigmaspina
  - - Ornithosuchus
    - - Riojasuchus
      - Venaticosuchus

A relationship amongst proterochampsians is unlikely, as the only similarity they share is a rough skull roof, and proterochampsians lack the characteristic spine tables and often have much thicker, sculpted osteoderms. The relationship to ornithosuchids is more plausible, as they share some characteristic features, but not all. However, it is also equally plausible that Aenigmaspina is related erpetosuchids, a group of small pseudosuchians with similarly enigmatic and variable affinities, as they both share broad spine tables, although none are as prominently Y-shaped like in Aenigmaspina. Erpetosuchid osteoderms are also typically thicker and more ornamented than the thin, smooth ones of Aenigmaspina. Gracilisuchids are another small group it could belong to, however they can only be compared to by their osteoderms and vertebrae, both of which differ from Aenigmaspina (particularly the neural spines, which are uniquely trapezoid-shaped in gracilisuchids, unlike the rectangular spines of Aenigmaspina). However, osteoderm texture is known to vary throughout Pseudosuchia, so this trait may not be significant. The relationships of Aenigmaspina are likely to remain unresolved until more fossils (particularly from the skull) are found.

== Palaeoecology ==
In the Late Triassic, the Pant-y-ffynnon Quarry was part of an ancient island as part of a palaeo-archipelago across southern Wales and England to Bristol. The island was a forested karstic environment, riddled with fissures and caves in the limestone, to which long limbed, agile reptiles like Aenigmaspina may have been well suited for. Other archosaurs that coexisted with Aenigmaspina were the small, fast-running predatory crocodylomorph Terrestrisuchus, the herbivorous sauropodomorph dinosaur Pantydraco, and the coelophysoid theropod Pendraig. Rhynchocephalians (relatives of modern tuataras) are abundant, known from at least three species including Clevosaurus cambrica, Diphydontosaurus and one or two unnamed species.
