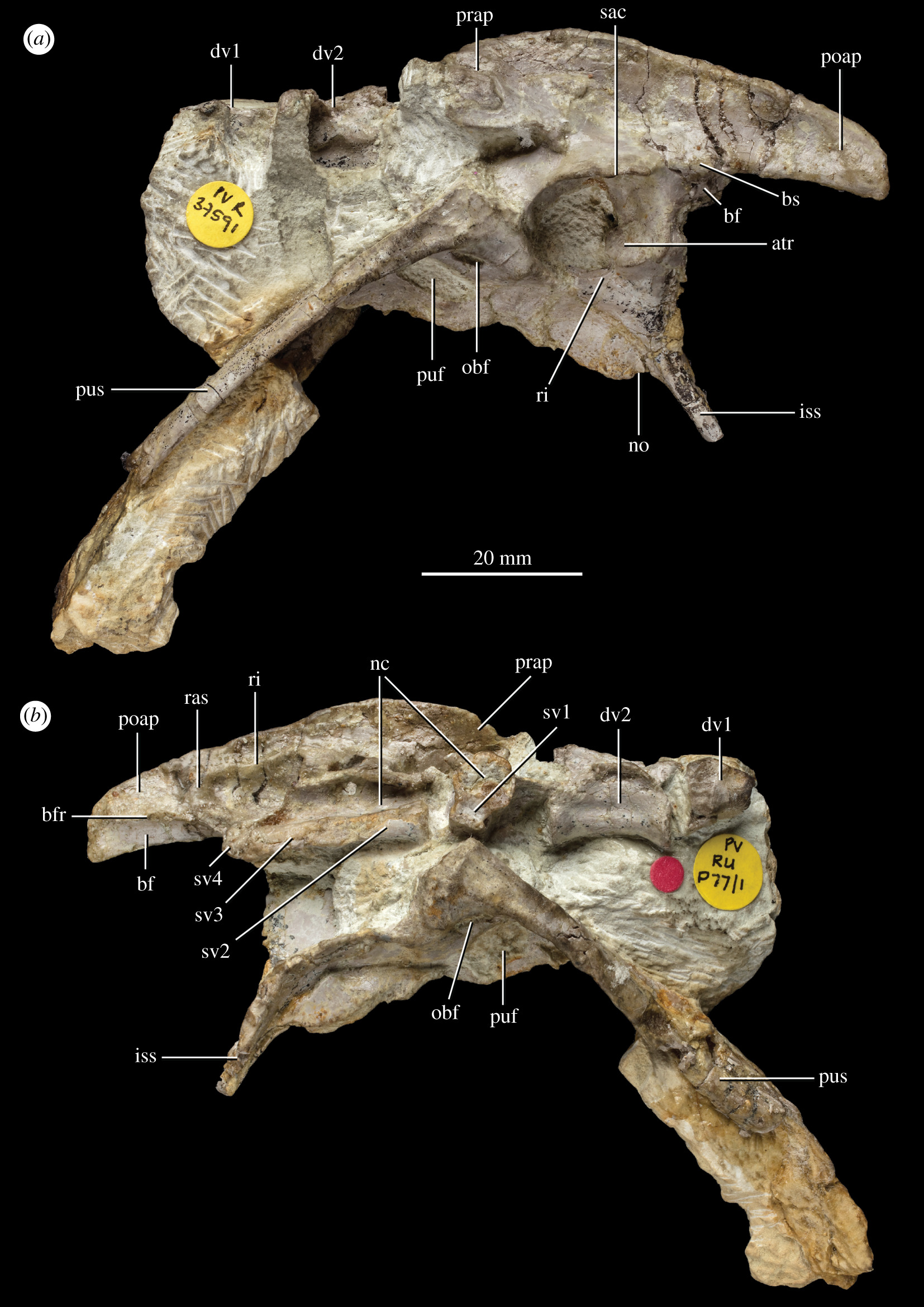
- Holotype pelvis of Pendraig milnerae

Scientific classification
- Kingdom: Animalia
- Phylum: Chordata
- Class: Reptilia
- Clade: Dinosauria
- Clade: Saurischia
- Clade: Theropoda
- Superfamily: †Coelophysoidea
- Genus: †Pendraig; Spiekman et al., 2021
- Species: †P. milnerae

Binomial name
- †Pendraig milnerae Spiekman et al., 2021

= Pendraig =

Pendraig Temporal range: Late Triassic, ~215–201 Ma

Extinct genus of dinosaurs

Pendraig (meaning "chief dragon" in Middle Welsh) is a genus of coelophysoid theropod dinosaur from South Wales. It contains one species, Pendraig milnerae, named after Angela Milner. The specimen was discovered in the Pant-y-Ffynnon quarry. In life it would have measured 1 m (3.3 ft) in length.

== History ==
The holotype of Pendraig were found in the Pant-y-ffynnon Quarry in Wales in 1952 by Kenneth Alexander Kermack and Pamela Lamplugh Robinson along with the holotypes of Pantydraco and Terrestrisuchus, and were subsequently lost in the collections of the Natural History Museum, London. The fossils were originally thought to belong to a "coelurosaur" (in the outdated sense of the word) and even subsequently classified as a species of "Syntarsus" (now Megapnosaurus or Coelophysis). Recently Angela Milner and Susannah Maidment rediscovered the fossils stored with some crocodile bones (likely Terrestrisuchus). The fossils were named as representing a new genus of theropod in 2021.

== Description ==
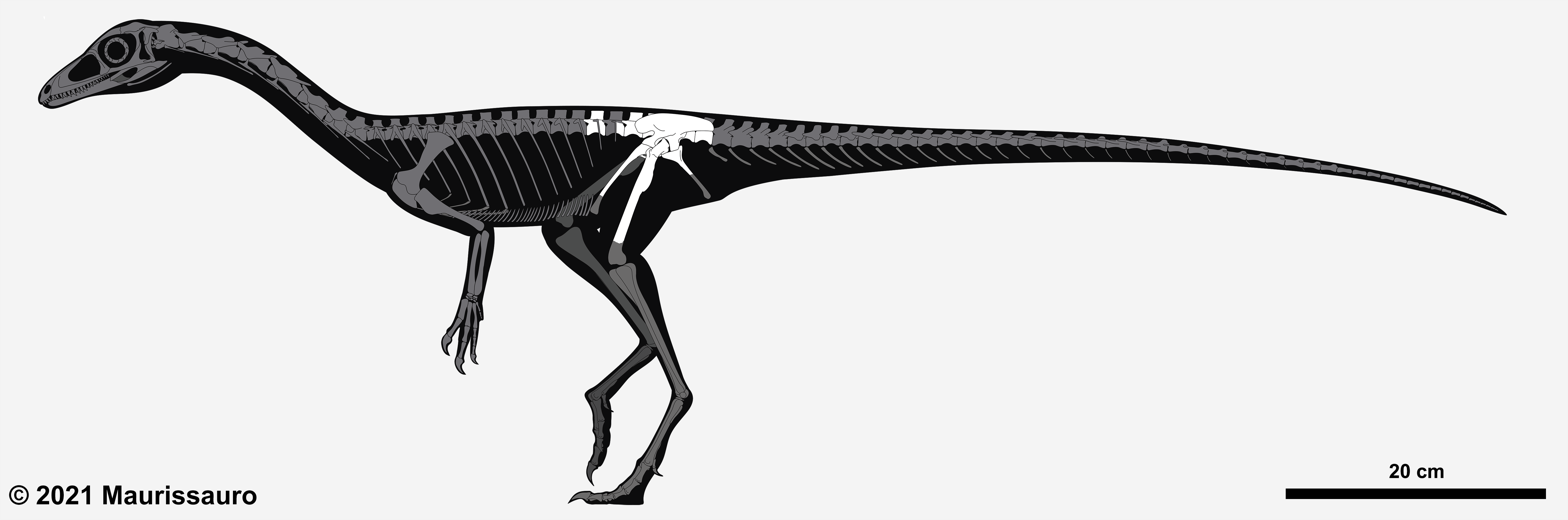
Skeletal reconstruction of Pendraig milnerae. Known skeletal elements represented in white and unknown in gray.

The holotype specimen consists of NHMUK PV R 37591, "An articulated vertebral series and pelvic girdle comprising the two posteriormost dorsal vertebrae missing most of the neural spines, the three anteriormost sacral vertebrae and a small fragment of the centrum of the fourth sacral, a complete left ilium, a largely complete left pubis missing the distal end, a left ischium missing most of the distal portion, a largely complete right pubis missing the distal end, and a right ischium missing most of the dorsal and distal portions" a left femur that is from the same individual was found disarticulated from the main block.

== Classification ==
Spiekman et al. recover Pendraig as a coelophysoid theropod, in a polytomy with Powellvenator, Lucianovenator, and the clade comprising "Syntarsus" kayentakatae and Coelophysidae. Their analysis is shown below:

- Coelophysoidea
  - Panguraptor
  - - Lucianovenator
    - Pendraig
    - Powellvenator
    - - "Syntarsus" kayentakatae
      - Coelophysidae

== Paleoecology ==
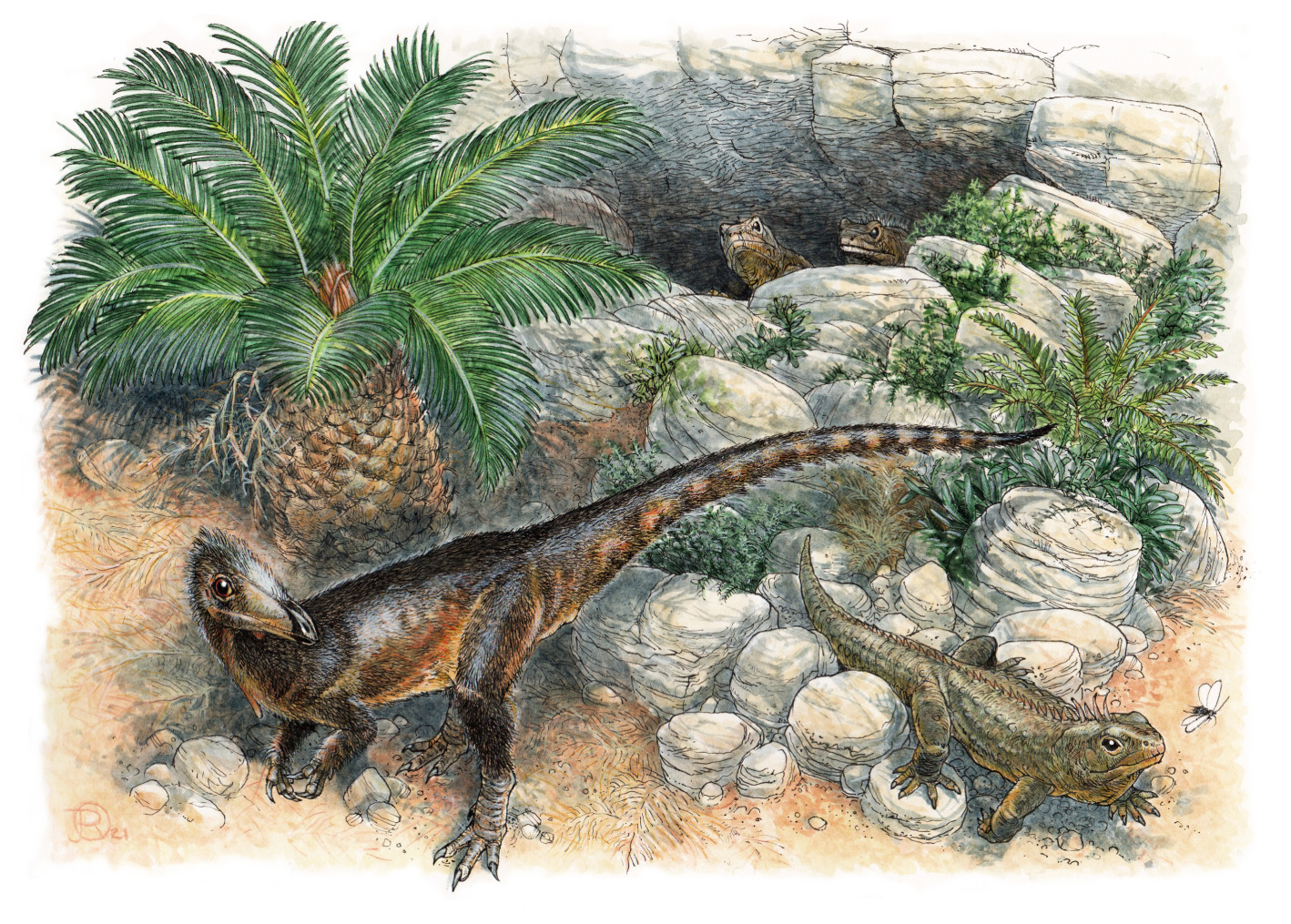
Life reconstruction of Pendraig milnerae with three Clevosaurus cambrica

During the Late Triassic, the areas of southwestern Britain Pendraig was found and lived in consisted of a series of islands made from Carboniferous Limestone that had been folded and pushed upwards. The environment would have been dry forests described as similar to the Cayman Islands. Other taxa known from the Pant-y-Ffynnon quarry that would have lived alongside Pendraig include the engimatic pseudosuchian Aenigmaspina, the basal crocodylomorph Terrestrisuchus, the sauropodomorphs Thecodontosaurus and Pantydraco, the rhynchocephalians Clevosaurus and Diphydontosaurus, and the gliding reptile Kuehneosaurus. Based on similar patterns on island ecosystems like Cayman Islands and Aldabra, it is likely there were large densities of these species due to a lack of known large predators and competition from other animals.

Due to its island habitat, the small size of Pendraig may result from insular dwarfism, where animals on islands get smaller to conserve resources. However, due to the specimen being sub-adult, it may or may not be the case.

== See also ==
- Palaeontology of Wales
