= Nicholas Dyer =

Kenyan wildlife photographer (born 1963)

Nicholas Dyer (born 5 April 1963) is a Kenyan wildlife photographer, author and conservationist, known for his work on painted wolves (African wild dogs). He is a Trustee of the Painted Wolf Foundation, a Fellow of the Royal Geographical Society in London and a member of The Explorers Club in New York.

== Background ==
Dyer was raised in Kenya, and spent the first part of his career in the City of London, first as a fund manager, and then running an investment marketing business. In 2012, Dyer returned to Africa and began a new career as a wildlife photographer and conservationist.

== Photographer and author ==
Having spent six years following the painted wolves of Mana Pools National Park on foot, Dyer worked with Peter Blinston to write the coffee table book, Painted Wolves: A Wild Dog's Life which provided insight into the lives of the painted wolves and what is being done to save them. All the photographs in the book were taken by Nicholas Dyer who followed the packs on foot for six years. The book charted the lives of three packs of painted wolves living on the floodplains of the Zambezi River. These were the same packs featured by the BBC in their 2018 Dynasties series, narrated by Sir David Attenborough.

In 2018, he was Highly Commended in the 2018 Natural History Museum's Wildlife Photographer of the Year competition, with his photograph Ahead in the Game. The photograph documented a behaviour that had never before been recorded: painted wolves predating on baboons.

== Conservation ==
Dyer founded the Painted Wolf Foundation, which raises awareness of this highly endangered species and supports conservation efforts on the ground. All profits from Painted Wolves: A Wild Dog's Life go to support the Painted Wolf Foundation. In addition, Dyer writes articles and gives talks about the species around the world and ongoing efforts to conserve them.

== Publications ==
- Painted Wolves: A Wild Dog's Life (2018)
