= Chitake River =

River in Mana Pools National Park, Zimbabwe

Chitake

Physical characteristics
- Source
  - location: Zambezi Escarpment, Zimbabwe
  - coordinates: 16°10′30″S 29°35′13″E
- Mouth: Rukomechi River
  - location: Mana Pools National Park, Zimbabwe
  - coordinates: 16°04′32″S 29°24′46″E

The Chitake River flows through the Mana Pools National Park, Zimbabwe, and has its source in the Zambezi Escarpment. The source is a perennial spring at the foothills. The river flows for 1 kilometre within the canyon walls and discharges into the Rukomechi River.

There are four undeveloped camping sites are available for guests.

There is a major fossil site on the Chitake River, where large numbers of Syntarsus rhodesiensis have been found.
