= St. George Dinosaur Discovery Site =

Dinosaur fossil trackway

Coordinates: 37°6′4.21″N 113°32′5.86″W

Grallator footprints made by a trackmaker similar to Coelophysis rhodesiensis, found at the St. George Dinosaur Discovery Site.

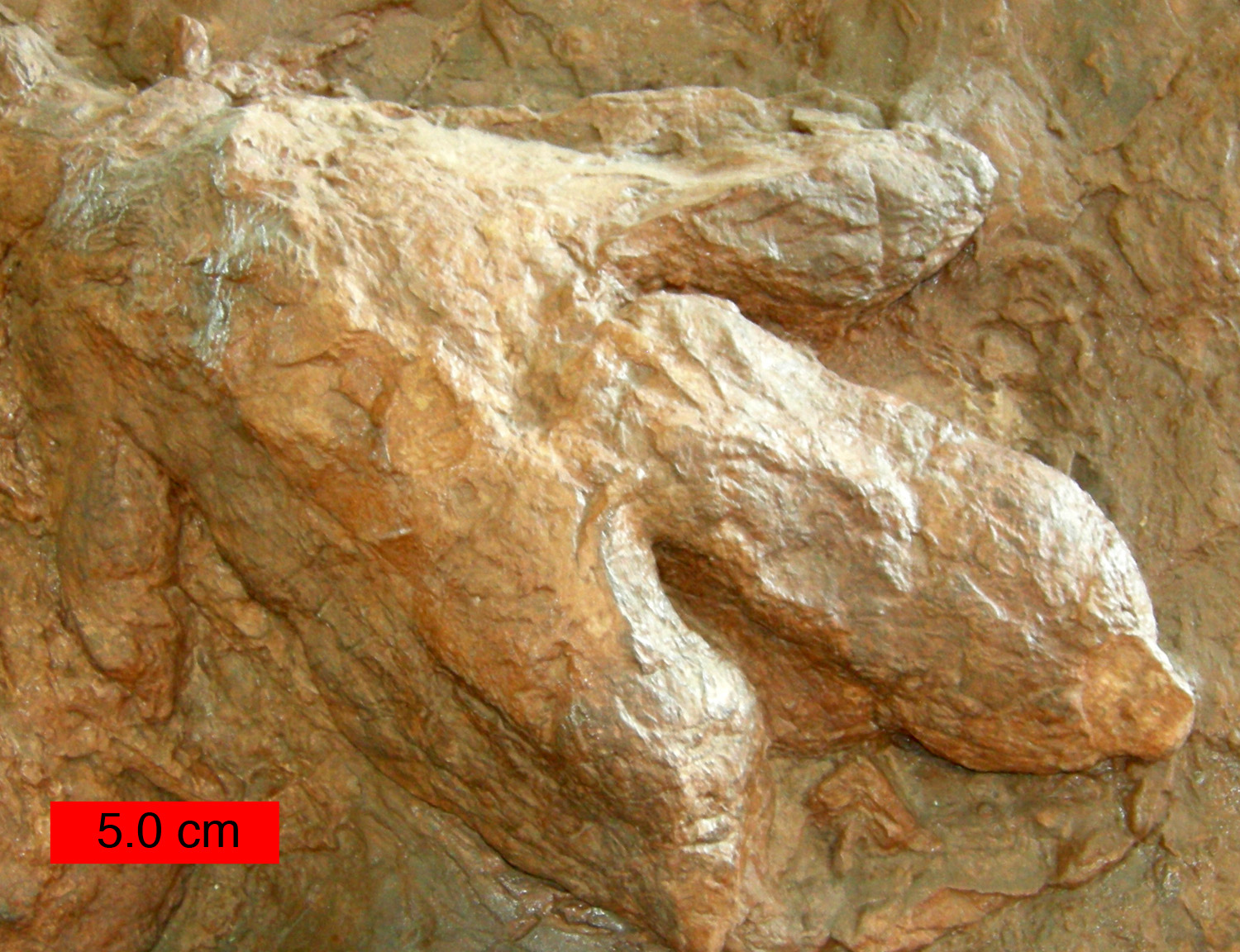
Gigandipus footprint at the site

The St. George Dinosaur Discovery Site is a fossil site and museum at Johnson Farm in Saint George, Utah. The museum preserves thousands of dinosaur footprints right at the original site of discovery.

The site was discovered by accident on February 26, 2000 by Dr. Sheldon Johnson, a retired optometrist and resident of St. George. He was in the process of excavating his property when he stumbled upon a large, naturally cut rock. The rock exposed a natural dinosaur footprint, which Johnson originally thought to be a complete dinosaur fossil due to the quality of the preservation.

Realizing that these dinosaur tracks would be best served if they were maintained for scientific and educational purposes, Dr. Johnson and his wife, LaVerna, worked to set aside the land and its fossils. Eventually the Johnsons donated the tracks that had been found and arranged for the land to be cared for by the City of St. George. They worked with scientists, local businesses, and government officials on the local, state, and national levels to create the museum which opened in 2005 and is here today. They set up the foundation that continues to preserve the site as a creative learning environment.

The best preserved and most numerous tracks today form the in-place trackway and exhibits of the St. George Dinosaur Discovery Site. Many other fossils including bones of dinosaurs and fish, shells of small aquatic animals, and leaves and seeds of plants, have joined the footprints, enabling palaeontologists to reconstruct the nearly 200 million-year-old ecosystem preserved here with unprecedented clarity, an extreme rarity for rocks of any period.

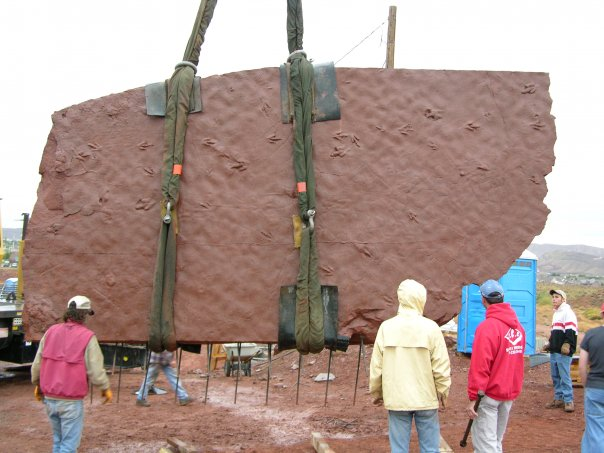
Large 26.5 ton Grallator track block

== See also ==
- Moenave Formation
- Paleontology in Utah
