= Syntarsus =

Syntarsus is a generic name that has been used for the following taxa:

- Syntarsus a junior synonym of the Colydiinae beetle genus Cerchanotus Erichson, 1845.
- Syntarsus kayentakatae is the former name of a theropod dinosaur later classified as Megapnosaurus, but is now not definitively assigned to any specific genus.
- Syntarsus rhodesiensis is the former name of a theropod dinosaur later classified as Megapnosaurus.
