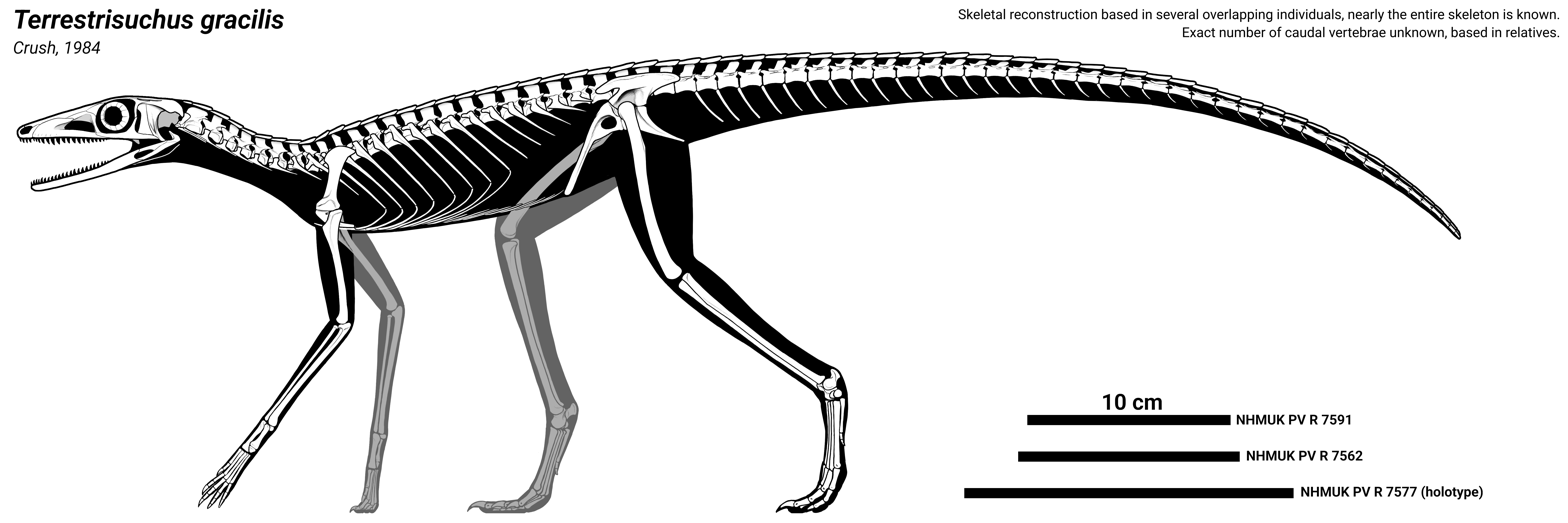
- Skeletal reconstruction
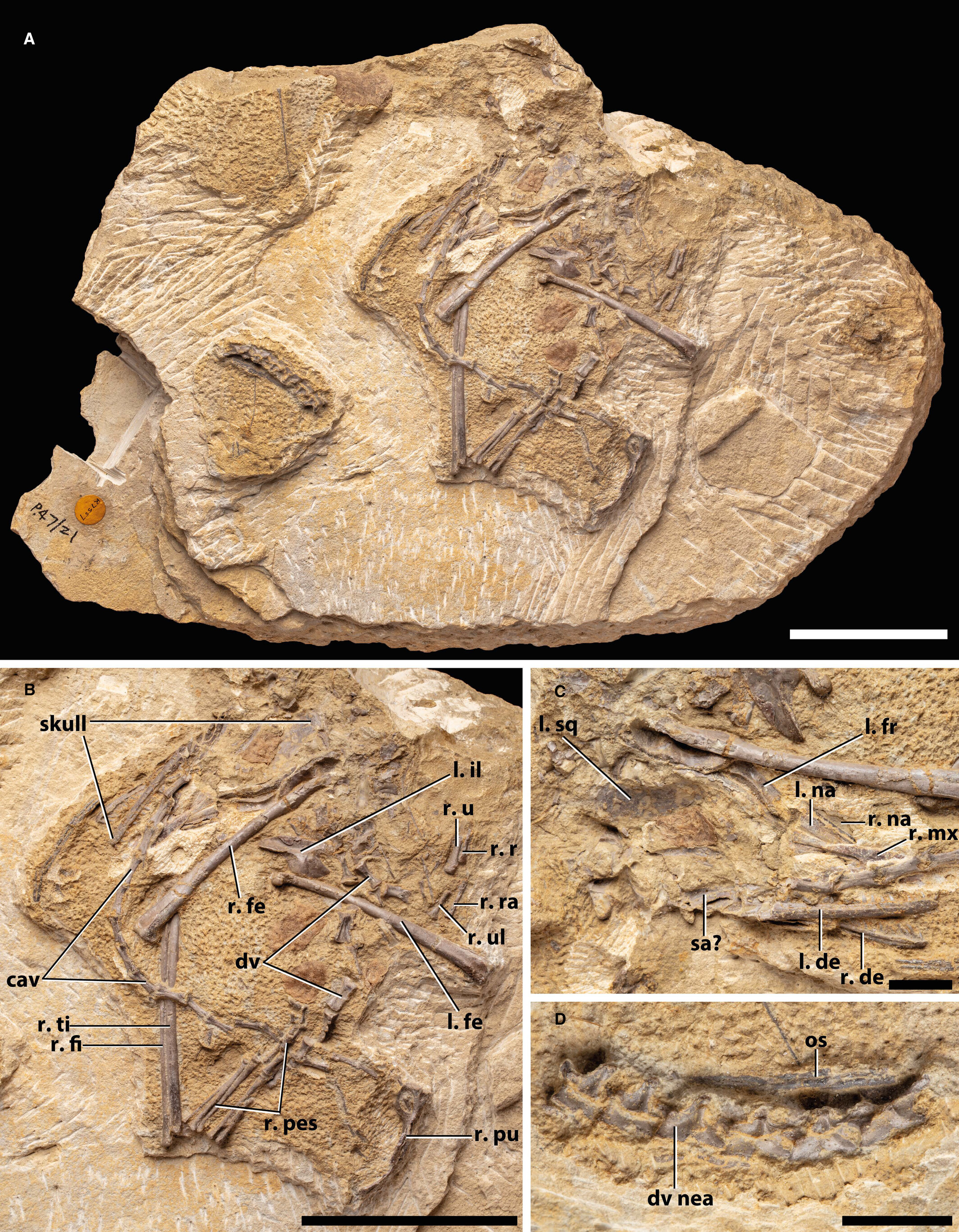
- Holotype

Scientific classification
- Kingdom: Animalia
- Phylum: Chordata
- Class: Reptilia
- Clade: Archosauria
- Clade: Pseudosuchia
- Clade: Crocodylomorpha
- Family: †Saltoposuchidae
- Genus: †Terrestrisuchus; Crush, 1984
- Species: †T. gracilis

Binomial name
- †Terrestrisuchus gracilis Crush, 1984

= Terrestrisuchus =

Terrestrisuchus Temporal range: Late Triassic, Rhaetian

Genus of terrestrial crocodylomorph

Terrestrisuchus is an extinct genus of very small early crocodylomorph that was about 76 centimetres (30 in) long. Fossils have been found in Wales and Southern England and date from near the very end of the Late Triassic during the Rhaetian, and it is known by type and only known species T. gracilis. Terrestrisuchus was a long-legged, active predator that lived entirely on land, unlike modern crocodilians. It inhabited a chain of tropical, low-lying islands that made up southern Britain, along with similarly small-sized dinosaurs and abundant rhynchocephalians. Numerous fossils of Terrestrisuchus are known from fissures in limestone karst which made up the islands it lived on, which formed caverns and sinkholes that preserved the remains of Terrestrisuchus and other island-living reptiles.

== Description ==
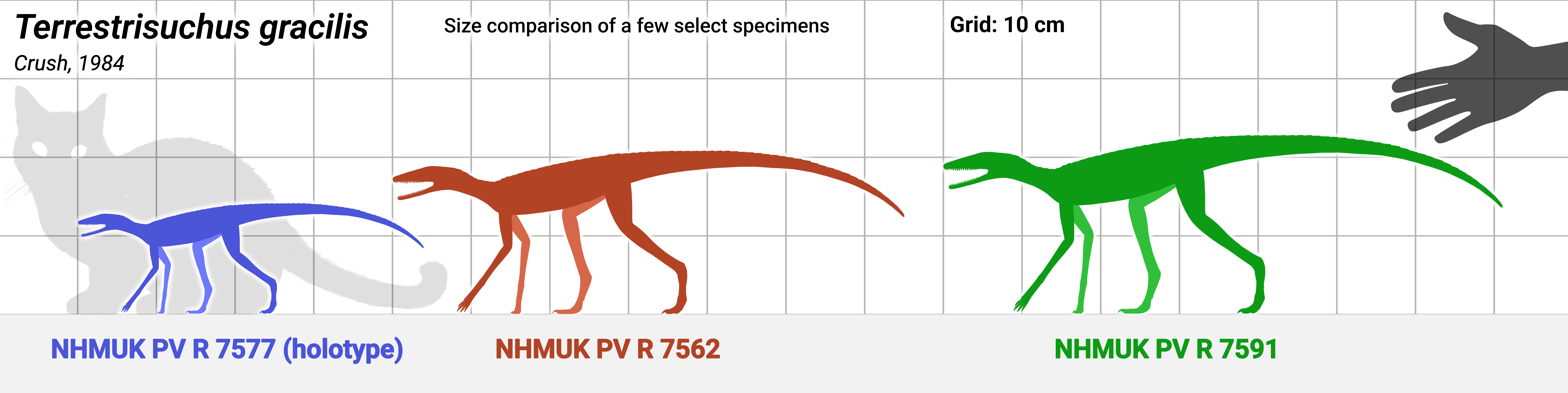
Size comparison

Terrestrisuchus was a small, slender crocodylomorph with very long legs, quite unlike modern crocodilians. It was initially estimated to have been between 49 and 76 centimetres (19 and 30 in) long, although this estimate may be based on juvenile specimens and fully grown Terrestrisuchus may have reached or exceeded 1 metre (3.3 ft) in length.

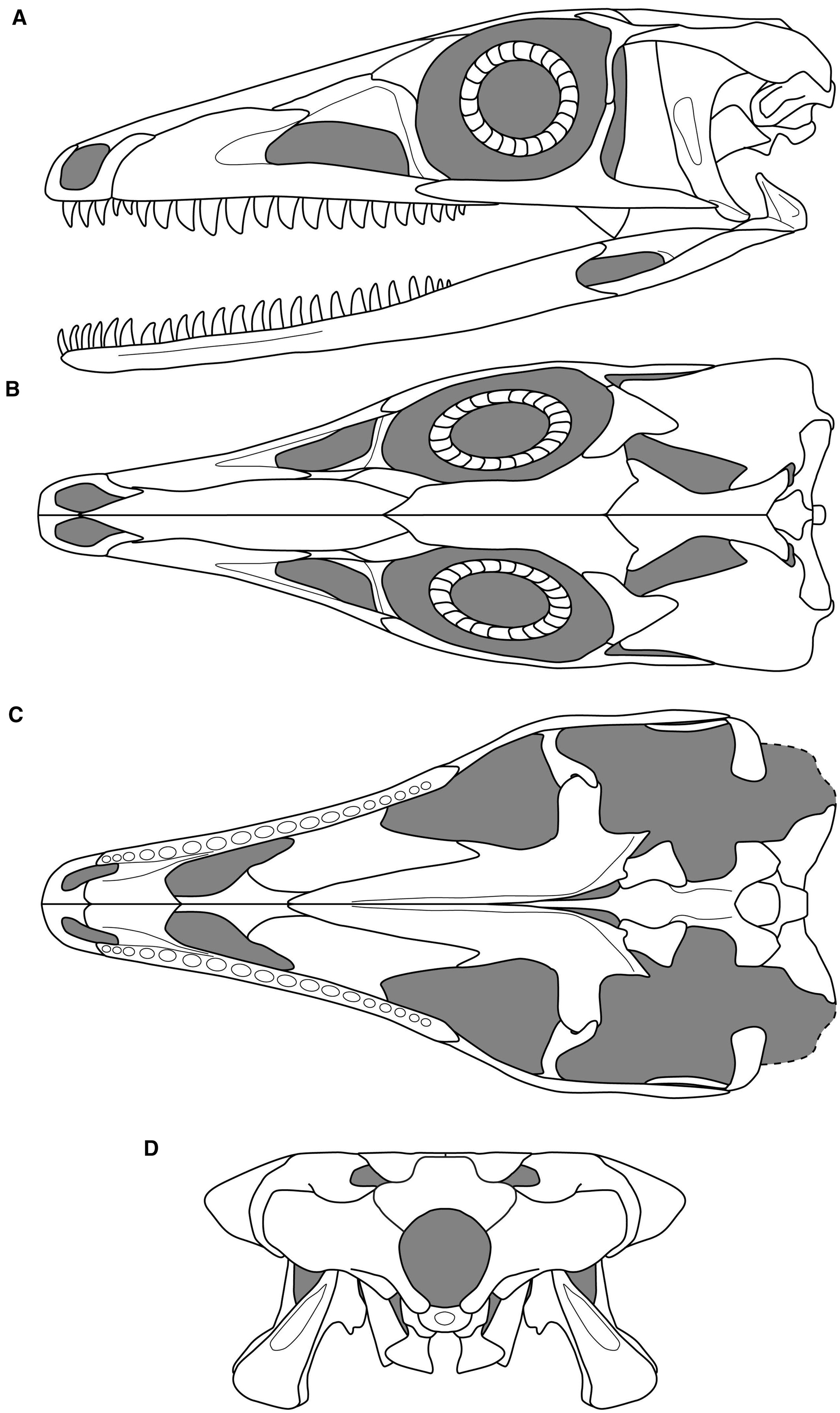
Skull reconstruction

Its skull was long and narrow, with a tapering, pointed triangular snout lined with sharp curved teeth. The upper jaw margin was straight, and lacked a diastema (a gap in the tooth row) between the maxilla and the premaxilla. By contrast, the long and slender dentary bones of the lower jaw curved slightly upwards towards the front. Unlike modern crocodilians, the eye of Terrestrisuchus was supported by a scleral ring (a ring of ossicles).

The body was relatively short and shallow, and the spine was topped by paired rows of osteoderms running down from its neck down its back. These osteoderms are described as "leaf-shaped", being relatively longer than wide with a prominent spur at the front that slides under and interlocks with the scute in front of it. This provides a rigid support for the body and limited the flexibility of its spine, supporting its body on land. The hips of Terrestrisuchus had an elongated pubis, unlike living crocodilians. Terrestrisuchus is also known to have had tightly packed gastralia, or belly ribs. Its tail was particularly long, about twice the length of the head and body combined with an estimated 70 caudal vertebrae in total, and may have been used as a balance allowing the animal to rear up and run on its hind legs for brief periods.

=== Limbs and posture ===
Unlike modern crocodylians, the limbs of Terrestrisuchus were very long in proportion to the body and were held upright directly beneath it. The shape of the ankles and the bones in the hands and feet also suggest that Terrestrisuchus was digitigrade, with elongated metacarpus (wrist) and metatarsal bones that were pressed tightly together, similar to the feet of fast-running dinosaurs, suggesting that Terrestrisuchus was highly cursorial, adapted for running at high speeds. The pisiform bone in the wrist is notably smaller compared to early crocodyliforms such as Protosuchus, as well as modern crocodilians, indicating that Terrestrisuchus had less flexible wrists. Crush reconstructed Terrestrisuchus as a quadruped, with noticeably longer hind limbs than its forelimbs and its hips held high above the shoulder. However, based on these proportions it has also been suggested that Terrestrisuchus may have been bipedal instead. This question remained controversial in subsequent studies. A quantitative analysis of limb proportions suggested quadrupedal locomotion in early Crurotarsi in general, with quadrupedalism further suggested by a quantitative analysis of the animals' limb robusticity, whereas a study of femoral mid-diaphyseal cross sectional geometry supports bipedal locomotion.

Notably, the acetabulum (hip socket) of Terrestrisuchus is perforated and forms an opening between the hip bones. This feature is otherwise only known in dinosaurs (as well as a few other early crocodylomorphs) and is often regarded as a defining feature of that clade. Similarly, the femur of Terrestrisuchus has a distinct head that faces inwards towards the body, and fits into the hip socket at a right angle to the leg. This condition is described as "buttress-erect", and it is typical of dinosaurs and their close relatives but otherwise unheard of in pseudosuchians outside of basal crocodylomorphs. Other pseudosuchians with upright limbs were typically "pillar-erect", with their femurs attached into a hip-socket that faced directly downwards. The buttress-erect posture of Terrestrisuchus and other basal crocodylomorphs is unique amongst crocodile-line archosaurs, and restricted its posture to a permanently upright stance. Its posture was further restricted to an upright gait by the calcaneal tubercle on its heel bone pointing directly backwards from the foot, unlike the back-and-sideways facing tuber of modern, sprawling crocodilians.

== History of discovery ==
The first fossils of Terrestrisuchus were discovered by Professor K. A. Kermack and Dr. Pamela Lamplugh Robinson in the spring of 1952, recovered from the Pant-y-ffynon Quarry located near Cowbridhe, Glamorgan in South Wales. Their finds were presented by Kermack to the Linnean Society of London on October 8, 1953, and was recognised belonging to a "primitive crocodile or crocodile ancestor". No osteoderms had been identified yet at the time, which Kermack regarded as representing a "missing link" between modern crocodilians and the Triassic "thecodonts". The fossils included several well-preserved articulated partial skeletons and various isolated bones. Kermack refrained from naming the animal or nominating a type specimen, as preparation of the fossils was still ongoing. The specimens were eventually named and thoroughly described by P. J. Crush in 1984, with the generic name Terrestrisuchus chosen to emphasise the terrestrial lifestyle of this crocodylomorph, and the specific name from the Latin gracilis for its light, graceful build.

The Pant-y-ffynnon Quarry is composed mostly of Carboniferous limestone, but the fossils of Terrestrisuchus were recovered from Triassic sedimentary rocks that were deposited within fissures in the limestone (such as sandstones and marls). The age of the deposits has been historically debated, with older literature suggesting a Carnian to Norian age. However, palynological data has been used to determine a younger Rhaetian age, close to the very end of the Triassic. This estimate has been corroborated by Rhaetian index fossils such as conchostracans and geomorphological data.

Additional material attributed to Terrestrisuchus has been discovered in other Late Triassic fissure deposits in South Wales and Bristol, including the Ruthin Quarry in Wales and the Tytherington and Cromhall quarries near Bristol, as well as a possible specimen from Durdham Down; all of the English remains have been recovered from the Magnesian Conglomerate. The fossils of Terrestrisuchus were originally housed at University College, London before being transferred to the Natural History Museum in London where they are currently stored.

== Classification ==
Terrestrisuchus was originally classified as a member of the crocodylomorph suborder "Sphenosuchia", a group that included various other similar long-legged early crocodylomorphs and was considered to be a separate radiation from the group that all later crocodylomorphs would evolve from. However, this classification was made prior to the invention of cladistic phylogenetic analyses, which has since demonstrated that "Sphenosuchia" is an unnatural grouping (paraphyletic), meaning that "sphenosuchians" are not all descended from a single common ancestor to the exclusion of all other crocodylomorphs. Instead, the "sphenosuchians" are a grade of basal crocodylomorphs that lead up to the more derived crocodyliforms. Nonetheless, Terrestrisuchus has consistently been recovered within this grade (as shown in the cladogram below).

When describing Terrestrisuchus in 1984, Crush recognised it shared a close relationship to the German "sphenosuchian", Saltoposuchus. As such, he erected the new family Saltoposuchidae for the two genera under "Sphenosuchia". However, few publications since its naming used the name Saltoposuchidae following the adoption of cladistics, in part due to the suggestion that Terrestrisuchus and Saltoposuchus were synonymous (see below). Nonetheless, some early analyses, namely Sereno and Wild (1992), recovered a clade consisting of the two along with the South African form Litargosuchus. (Note: Though Litargosuchus had not yet been named and at the time was regarded as a specimen of Pedeticosaurus.) This clade was more recently recovered by Leardi et al. (2017), who noted that this clade could have approximated Crush's concept of Saltoposuchidae. This suggestion was formalised in 2023, when this clade was phylogenetically defined as Saltoposuchidae by Spiekman (2023). The cladogram below depicts the results of his analysis:

- Crocodylomorpha
  - Erpetosuchus
  - Redondavenator
  - Carnufex
  - CM 73372
  - - - Trialestes
      - Pseudohesperosuchus
    - - Saltoposuchidae
        - Saltoposuchus
        - - Litargosuchus
          - Terrestrisuchus
      - - Hesperosuchus
        - - Kayentasuchus
          - Dromicosuchus
      - - Sphenosuchus
        - - Dibothrosuchus
          - - Junggarsuchus
            - - Hallopodidae
              - Crocodyliformes

=== Synonymy with Saltoposuchus ===
In 1988, just four years after it was named, palaeontologists Michael Benton and James Clark first formally proposed that specimens of Terrestrisuchus in fact represented the juveniles of Saltoposuchus and so was a junior synonym of the latter. The similarity between Terrestrisuchus and Saltoposuchus had been identified since its description, and Crush had erected the family Saltoposuchidae in recognition of this. However, Benton and Clark considered that the characters Crush identified to separate the two taxa as invalid, and so that the two were likely to belong to be at least of the same genus. This hypothesis was rejected by Sereno and Wild in 1992, who claimed to have identified additional differences between the two genera, although Clark et al. (2001) considered these differences to be dubious or due to the size difference between their remains. In 2003, palaeontologist David Allen identified juvenile features in Terrestrisuchus, and believed all the differing traits between it and Saltoposuchus to be ontogenetically variable, and so were otherwise indistinguishable. However, Allen ultimately rescinded this view and came to reject their synonymy in his unpublished Ph.D. thesis on the anatomy of Terrestrisuchus in 2010.

A formal re-evaluation of the hypothesis in 2013 concluded that the available evidence was not consistent with the two species being synonymous, and that it is likely that Terrestrisuchus is indeed its own genus. This included the non-overlapping geographic and stratigraphic ranges of the two taxa, with Terrestrisuchus being at least "several million years" younger than Saltoposuchus, as well as inconsistencies in the patterns of the fusion of their vertebrae and the proportions of the hind limb during growth compared to other crocodylomorph growth series. Saltoposuchus itself was thoroughly redescribed in 2023 by Stephan Spiekman, who identified numerous morphological differences that could not be attributed to ontogeny or to individual variation, and so rejected their synonymy. The two taxa are nonetheless close relatives, comprising the clade Saltoposuchidae together with Litargosuchus.

== Palaeobiology ==
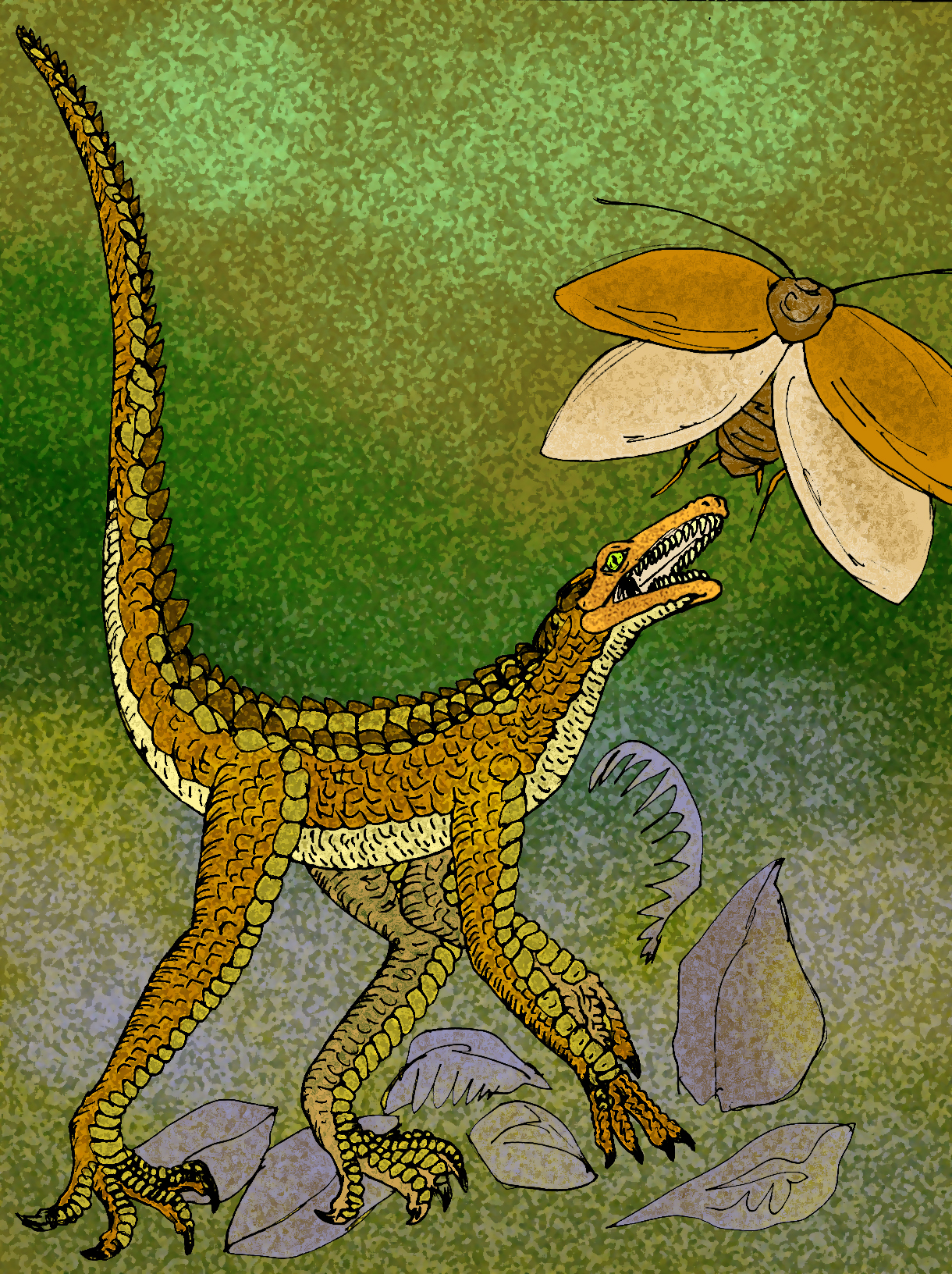
Terrestrisuchus depicted hunting a cockroach

The thin, serrated teeth of Terrestrisuchus indicate that it was carnivorous, and like other early crocodylomorphs it was likely a generalist pursuit hunter that preyed upon small to mid-sized prey items. The shape and construction of its hip bones, particularly the elongated pubis, indicate that they were rigidly sutured together and that its pubis was not mobile as it is in modern crocodilians. This indicates that Terrestrisuchus would not have utilised the hepatic piston method of breathing found in modern crocodilians. Also, the dimensions of its orbit and scleral ring suggest that it was a cathemeral animal.

=== Metabolism and growth ===
The microstructure of the limb bones of Terrestrisuchus show that it was well vascularised and contained large amounts of energy-consuming fibrolamellar bone tissue, indicating a relatively fast growth-rate for Terrestrisuchus compared to other archosauriforms and even other pseudosuchians. Such a high growth rate is in agreement with an elevated, "warm-blooded" metabolism. However, the related "sphenosuchian" Hesperosuchus was found to have a slower, more typical crocodilian-like growth rate, and so it is possible that the high growth rate of Terrestrisuchus was due to the sampled specimens being immature and still rapidly growing, and that adults had a slower metabolism.

== Palaeoecology ==
Terrestrisuchus was a coastal species, unusual for basal crocodylomorphs, which are typically known from inland floodplain environments. In the Late Triassic, the Pant-y-ffynnon Quarry and other quarries were part of ancient islands in a palaeo-archipelago that stretched across southern Wales and England to Bristol. The islands were forested karstic environments, riddled with fissures, sinkholes and caverns eroded into the limestone, environments which long limbed, agile reptiles like Terrestrisuchus may have been well suited to inhabit.

On the Pant-y-ffynnon palaeo-island, Terrestrisuchus coexisted with other archosaurs such as the similarly long-legged, enigmatic pseudosuchian Aenigmaspina, the herbivorous sauropodomorph dinosaur Pantydraco, and the coelophysoid theropod Pendraig. Rhynchocephalians (relatives of modern tuataras) were very abundant and are known from at least three species including Clevosaurus cambrica, Diphydontosaurus and at least one or two unnamed species, which likely formed a large part of the diet of Terrestrisuchus (possibly evidenced by bite marks on the bones of Clevosaurus that likely belong to Terrestrisuchus). Terrestrisuchus was a relatively rare component of the island's fauna, an expected relationship for a predatory animal.
