= Mavuradonha, Zimbabwe =

Range of mountains in Northern Zimbabwe

Coordinates: 16.462°S 31.079°E

Mavuradonha (formerly Mvuradona) is a range of mountains lying north of Centenary on the Zambezi Escarpment in Northern Zimbabwe. It was declared a protected area in 1987 under the CAMPFIRE programme, and a national monument in 2017. The name in Shona means 'Land of Falling Water' or simply 'water falls'.

The highest point is Banirembizi beacon, at 1613 m.

Visitors can hike the mountainous hills and miombo woodland, and view the many animals and birds. Antelope include sable, eland, kudu, waterbuck and impala. Elephant, baboon, warthog, zebra and leopard are common and lion are occasionally seen. The 290 species of birds include a high density of raptors such as several types of eagles that inhabit the water-berry, mhobohobo, msasa and other brachystegia trees, as well as peregrine falcon. Camping and chalets are available at a site on the main road through the area.
