= Moenave Formation =

Geologic formation in Utah and Arizona

- Stratigraphic range: Early Jurassic, ca. 200 Ma
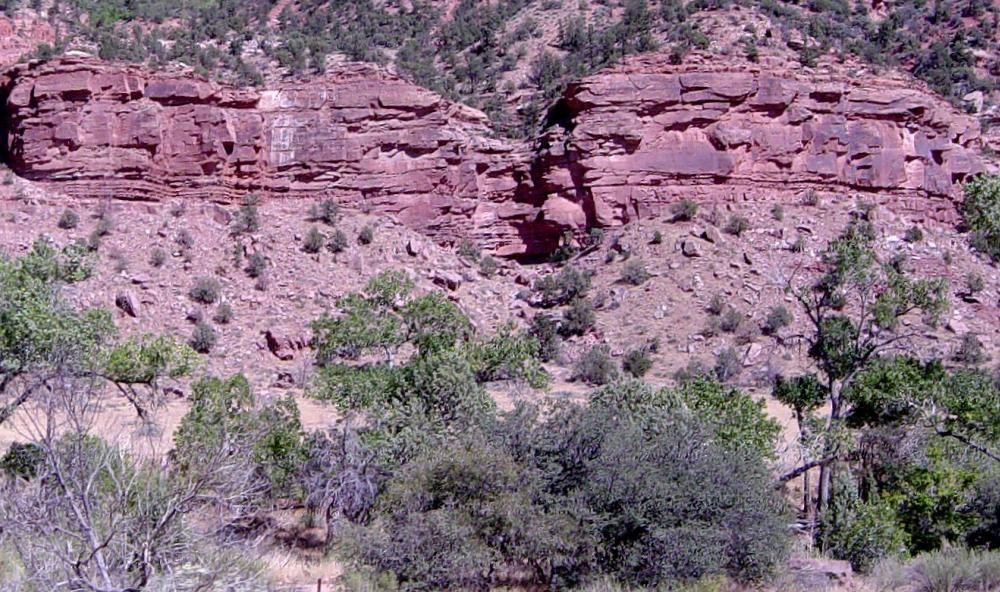
- Moenave Formation outcrop in Zion National Park
- Type: Geological formation
- Unit of: Glen Canyon Group

Lithology
- Primary: siltstone and sandstone

Location
- Country: United States
- Extent: Arizona, Nevada, Utah

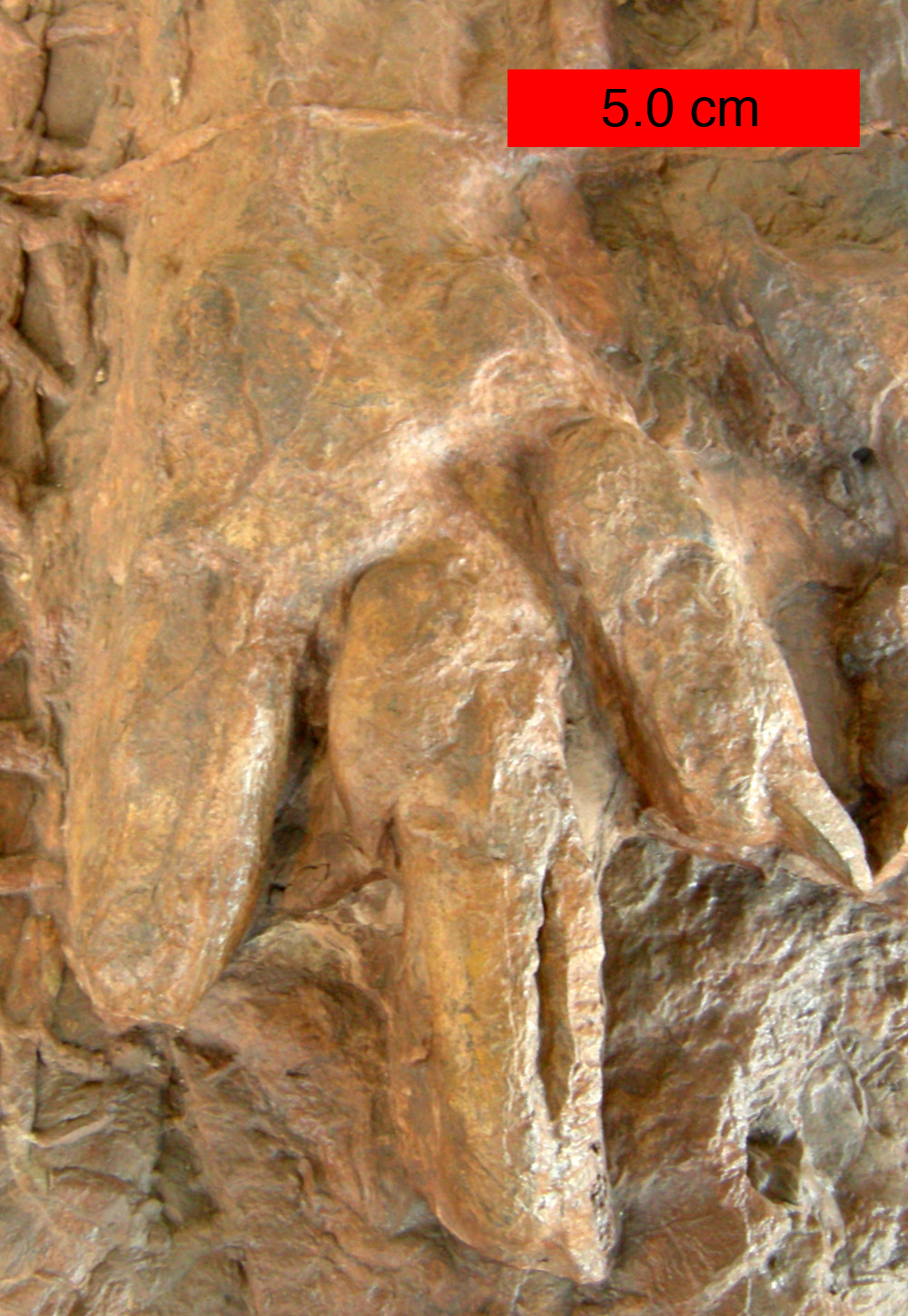
Eubrontes, a dinosaur footprint in the Moenave Formation at the St. George Dinosaur Discovery Site at Johnson Farm, southwestern Utah.

The Moenave Formation is a Mesozoic geologic formation, in the Glen Canyon Group. It is found in Utah and Arizona.

The Moenave was deposited on an erosion surface on the Chinle Formation following an early Jurassic uplift and unconformity that represents about ten million years of missing sedimentation. Periodic incursions of shallow seas from the north during the Jurassic flooded parts of Wyoming, Montana, and a northeast–southwest trending trough on the Utah/Idaho border. The Moenave was deposited in a variety of river, lake, and flood-plain environments, near the ancient Lake Dixie.

The oldest beds of this formation belong to the Dinosaur Canyon Member, a reddish, slope-forming rock layer with thin beds of siltstone that are interbedded with mudstone and fine sandstone. The Dinosaur Canyon, with a local thickness of 140 to 375 feet (43 to 114 m), was probably laid down in slow-moving streams, ponds and large lakes. Evidence for this is in cross-bedding of the sediments and large numbers of fish fossils.

The upper member of the Moenave is the pale reddish-brown with a thickness of 75 to 150 feet (23 to 46 m) and cliff-forming Springdale Sandstone. It was deposited in swifter, larger, and more voluminous streams than the older Dinosaur Canyon Member. Fossils of large sturgeon-like freshwater fish have been found in the beds of the Springdale Sandstone. The next member in the Moenave Formation is the thin-bedded Whitmore Point, which is made of mudstone and shale. The lower red cliffs visible from the Zion Human History Museum (until 2000 the Zion Canyon Visitor Center) and the St. George Dinosaur Discovery Site, discovered on February 26, 2000, are accessible examples of this formation.

== Paleofauna ==
Dinosaur remains are among the fossils that have been recovered from the formation, with only one species-level taxon, Protosuchus richardsoni, based on body fossils.

- Anomoepus – "footprints"
- Batrachopus – "footprints"
- Characichnos – "swim tracks"
- Crocodylia indet. (similar to Protosuchus) – "footprints"
- Eubrontes – "footprints, resting tracks and swim tracks"
- Eucynodontia indet. – "footprints"
- Gigandipus – "footprints"
- Grallator – "footprints, resting tracks (?) and trace fossil remains"
- indeterminate fish body fossils, such as unnamed specimens placed in the Coelacanthiformes, Dipnoi, Palaeoniscidae and the Semionotidae, and trace fossils not referable to any known genus
- Protosuchus richardsoni – protosuchid crocodyliform known from several partial to complete skeletons.
- cf. Pteraichnus – "footprints"
- Pteraichnus – "footprints"
- Pterosauria indet. – "footprints"
- Sphenodontia indet. – "footprints"
- Theropoda indet. (similar to "Coelophysis" rhodesiensis) – "vertebra from a juvenile and isolated teeth"
- Neotheropoda indet. – Single Vertebrae

== Glen Canyon Group ==
The 4 members of the Glen Canyon Group, from youngest (top member) to oldest (bottom member), are:

1. Navajo Sandstone – early Jurassic
2. Kayenta Formation – early Jurassic
3. Moenave Formation – early Jurassic
4. Wingate Sandstone – early Jurassic

== See also ==
- List of dinosaur-bearing rock formations
- List of stratigraphic units with indeterminate dinosaur fossils
- St. George Dinosaur Discovery Site in Saint George, Utah
