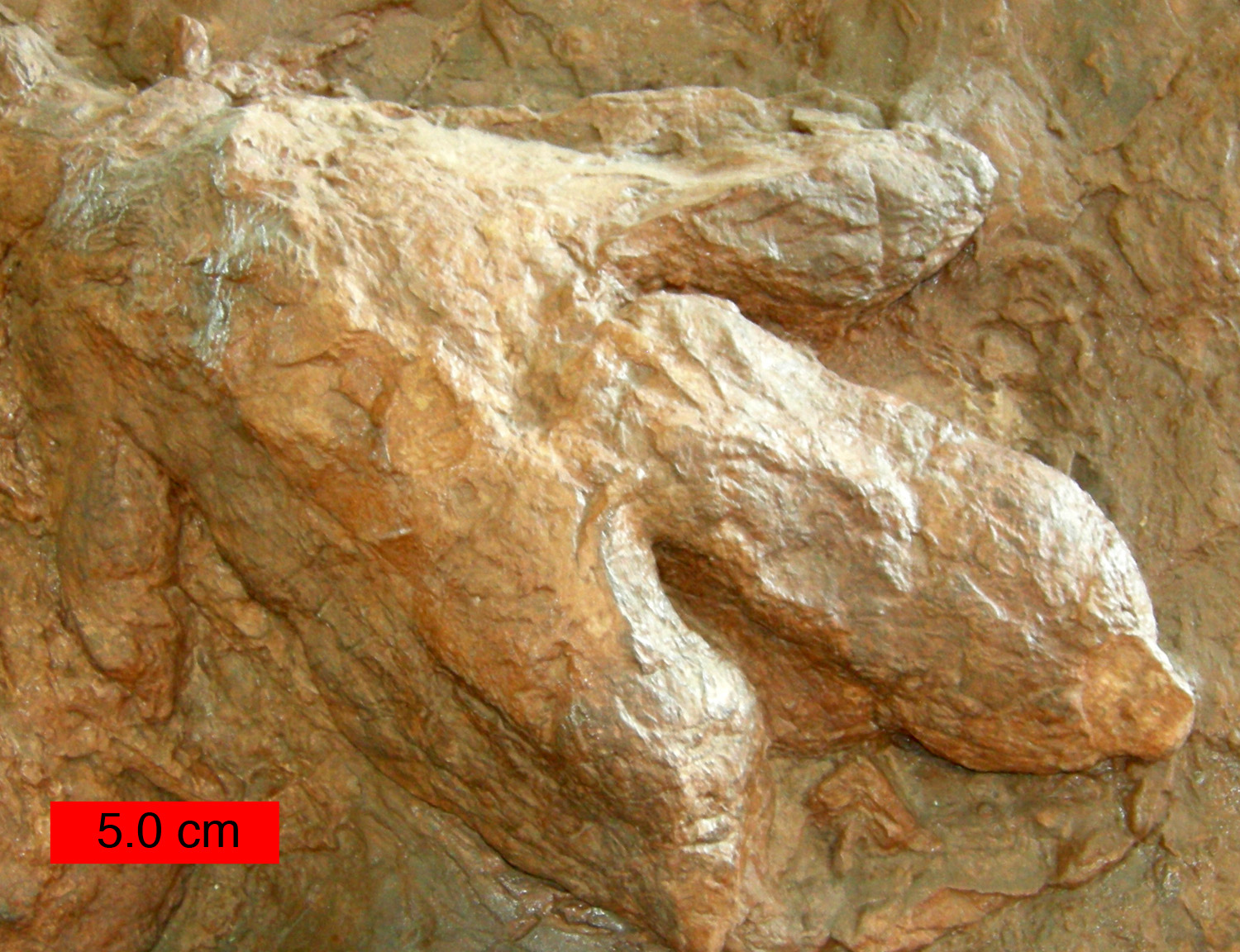
- Early Jurassic (Hettangian)-aged Gigandipus footprint from the St. George Dinosaur Discovery Site, Arizona

Trace fossil classification
- Domain: Eukaryota
- Kingdom: Animalia
- Phylum: Chordata
- Clade: Dinosauria
- Clade: Saurischia
- Clade: Theropoda
- Ichnofamily: †Gigandipodidae
- Ichnogenus: †Gigandipus; Hitchcock, 1845

= Gigandipus =

Gigandipus Temporal range: Norian–Cenomanian

Dinosaur footprint

Gigandipus is an ichnogenus of theropod dinosaur footprint. It is known from the Norian-Cenomanian and it is most well known from the St. George Dinosaur Discovery Site (Moenave Formation) of Utah, where it was likely the apex predator.

== See also ==
- List of dinosaur ichnogenera
