= Zambezi Escarpment =

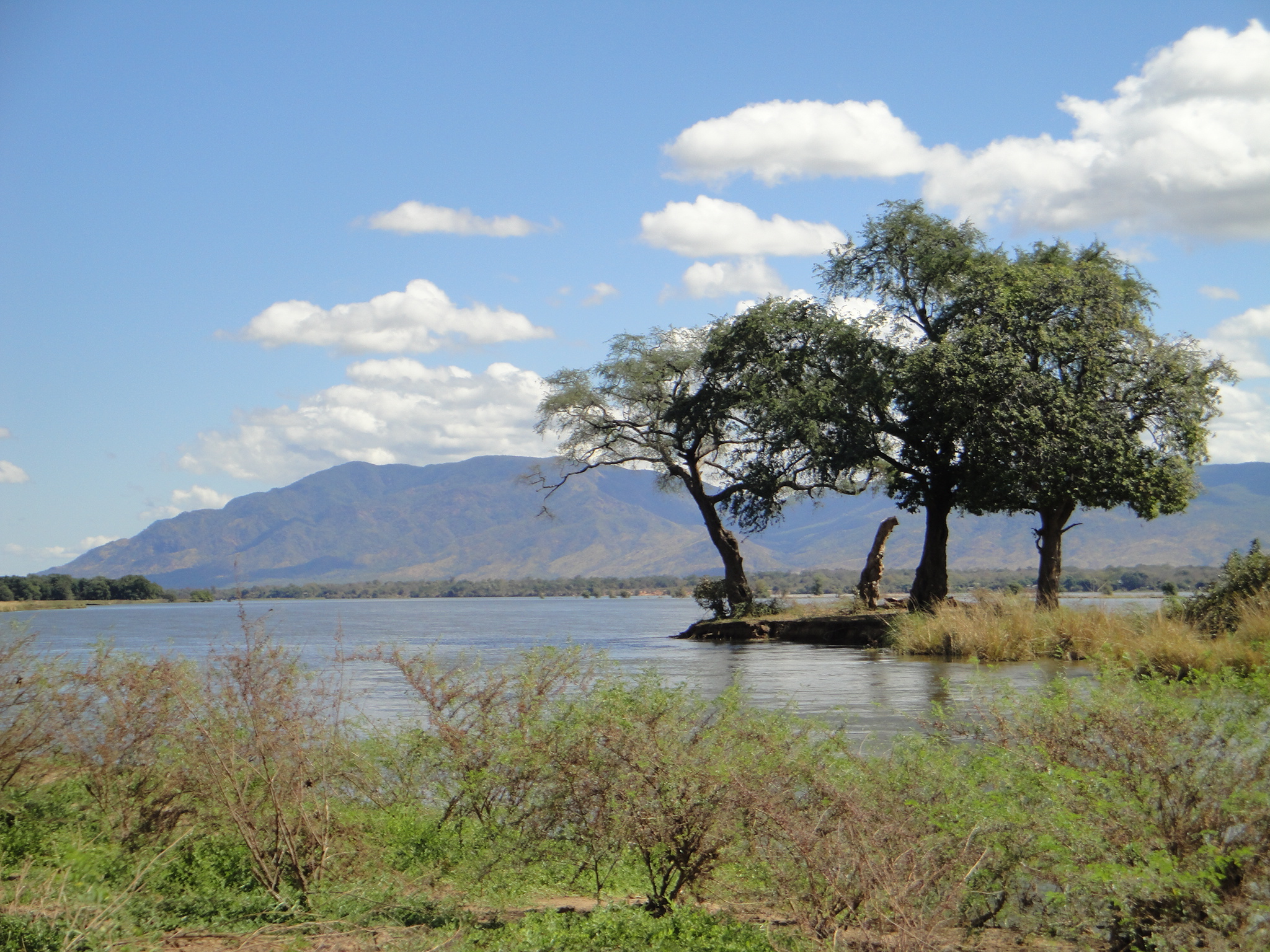
The view from an island in the Zambezi located at Mana Pools National Park

| | Northern (mainly Zambian) scarp | Southern (mainly Zimbabwean) scarp |
|---|---|---|
| Western end | 17°51′32″S 26°54′06″E | 17°43′50″S 27°46′57″E |
| Eastern end | 15°26′01″S 30°03′00″E | 16°24′03″S 32°12′48″E |

The Zambezi Escarpment is a name used for the escarpments forming both sides of the rift valley or graben in which lie the middle Zambezi river and Lake Kariba. They are fault scarps, rising 500 to 600 m (1,600 to 2,000 ft) higher than the lake or river, running from the Batoka Gorge roughly 800 km (500 mi) to the lower Zambezi, and facing each other about 50 to 100 km (31 to 62 mi) apart, closer in the west and opening up in the east.

The northern Zambezi Escarpment in Zambia is steeper. It is somewhat broken north of Lake Kariba, but is particularly steep and well-formed from a point north of Siavonga going east through the Lower Zambezi National Park to the Luangwa River. Along this section the bottom of the valley is relatively flat, providing a sharp contrast to the scarps.

The southern Zambezi Escarpment in Zimbabwe is quite marked in the west at the Chizarira Hills and the Chizarira National Park, but the slope becomes more broken and gentler further east around Matusadona National Park. It becomes steeper and more marked again from Kariba, east through Mana Pools National Park and then to the north of the Mvurwi Range and at the Mavuradona wilderness south of Lake Cahora Bassa. Here, the floor of the rift valley is quite flat, once again providing a marked contrast to the escarpment.

== See also ==
- List of escarpments
