= Pantyffynnon =

Village in Carmarthenshire, Wales

Coordinates: 51.787°N 04.000°W

- Location within Carmarthenshire
- OS grid reference: SN623114
- Community: Ammanford
- Principal area: Carmarthenshire
- Preserved county: Dyfed
- Country: Wales
- Sovereign state: United Kingdom
- Post town: AMMANFORD
- Postcode district: SA18
- Dialling code: 01269
- Police: Dyfed-Powys
- Fire: Mid and West Wales
- Ambulance: Welsh
- UK Parliament: Caerfyrddin
- Senedd Cymru – Welsh Parliament: Carmarthen East and Dinefwr

Pantyffynnon (Welsh pronunciation) is a small village in Carmarthenshire, Wales, half a mile south-west of Ammanford, and a mile east of Tycroes. It lies between the rivers Loughor and Amman at the foot of Mynydd y Betws.

The village is served by Pantyffynnon railway station on the Heart of Wales Line.
