= Mana Pools National Park =

UNESCO World Heritage Site
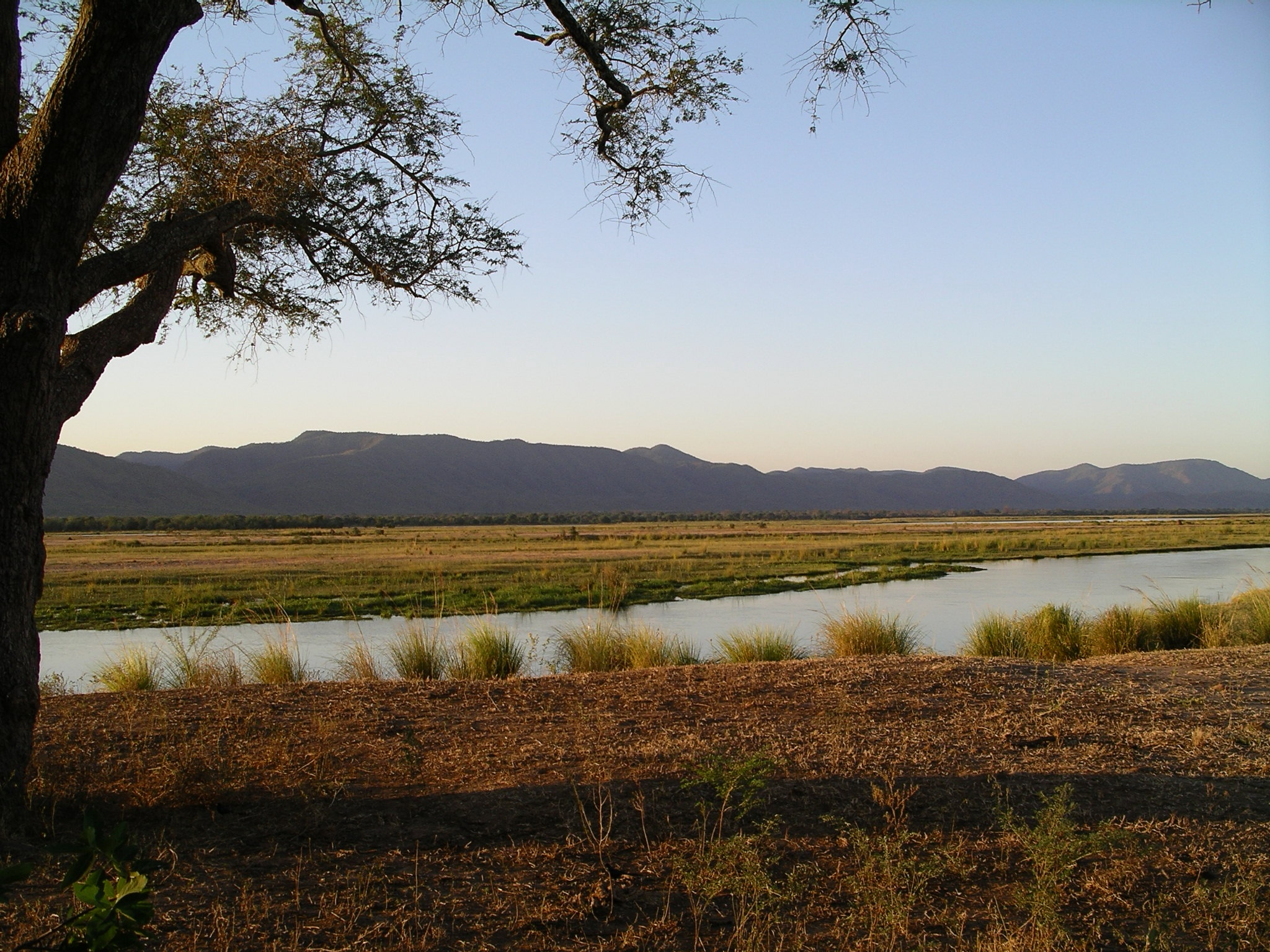
- The Zambezi from Mana Pools

- Location within Zimbabwe
- Location: Zimbabwe
- Part of: Mana Pools National Park, Sapi and Chewore Safari Areas
- Criteria: Natural: (vii), (ix), (x)
- Reference: 302
- Inscription: 1984 (8th Session)
- Area: 6,766 km^{2} (2,612 mi^{2})
- Coordinates: 15°45′S 29°20′E

Ramsar Wetland
- Designated: 3 May 2013
- Reference no.: 2106

Mana Pools National Park is a 2,196-square-kilometre (848 sq mi) wildlife conservation area and national park in northern Zimbabwe. It is a region of the lower Zambezi in Zimbabwe where the floodplain turns into a broad expanse of lakes after each rainy season. As the lakes gradually dry up and recede, the region attracts many large animals in search of water, making it one of Africa's most renowned game-viewing regions.

The park was inscribed, in conjunction with the Sapi Safari Area (1,180 km^{2} (460 sq mi)) and Chewore Safari Area (3,390 km^{2} (1,310 sq mi)), as a single UNESCO World Heritage Site (for a total of 6,766 km^{2} (2,612 sq mi)) in 1984. The Mana Pools were designated a Ramsar wetland of international importance on 3 January 2013. Mana Pools National Park is a World Heritage Site based on its pure wilderness and beauty. It is home to a wide range of mammals, over 350 bird species, and aquatic wildlife and is one of the world's wildest and best preserved natural ecological areas.

== Ecology ==
Mana means 'four' in Shona, in reference to the four large permanent pools formed by the meanderings of the middle Zambezi. These 2,500 km^{2} (970 sq mi) of river frontage, islands, sandbanks and pools, flanked by forests of mahogany, wild figs, ebonies and baobabs, is one of the least developed national parks in Southern Africa. It has the country's biggest concentration of hippopotami and crocodiles and large dry season mammal populations of the zebra, elephant and Cape buffalo. The area is also home to other threatened species including the lion, cheetah, Cape wild dog, and near-threatened species including leopard and the brown hyena.

When the area was inscribed by UNESCO, it was one of the most important refuges for eastern black rhinoceros populations in Africa, with about 500 animals. By 1994, poaching had reduced these to just 10 remaining rhinos, which were removed to another area for their protection.

== Threat ==
The Zimbabwean Ministry of Mines and Mining Development stated on 28 April 2023, that Shalom Mining Corporation Pvt Ltd has filed for a permit to prospect for oil and natural gas in an area with extremely high conservation value adjacent to Mana Pools. If permitted to proceed, this construction might endanger the nearby World Heritage Site.

== Conservation ==
The area was saved from a hydro-electric scheme in the early eighties which would have seen the flooding of the area. The area's ecology is affected by the regulation of the Kariba Dam and there are concerns that another potential dam on the Zambezi River, in the Mapata Gorge, might dramatically undermine the value of the area. Recently, the area was again saved from the Mupata Gorge hydro-electric scheme, where the chosen project was the Batoka Dam instead.

== Surrounding area ==
The park is contiguous with Zambia's Lower Zambezi National Park on the opposite side of the Zambezi River, and the larger UNESCO area is contiguous with the Urungwe Safari Area (2,870 km^{2} (1,110 sq mi)), the Dande Safari Area (523 km^{2} (202 sq mi)) and the Doma Safari Area (764 km^{2} (295 sq mi)).

== See also ==
- Chitake River
- Zambezi Escarpment

== Gallery ==
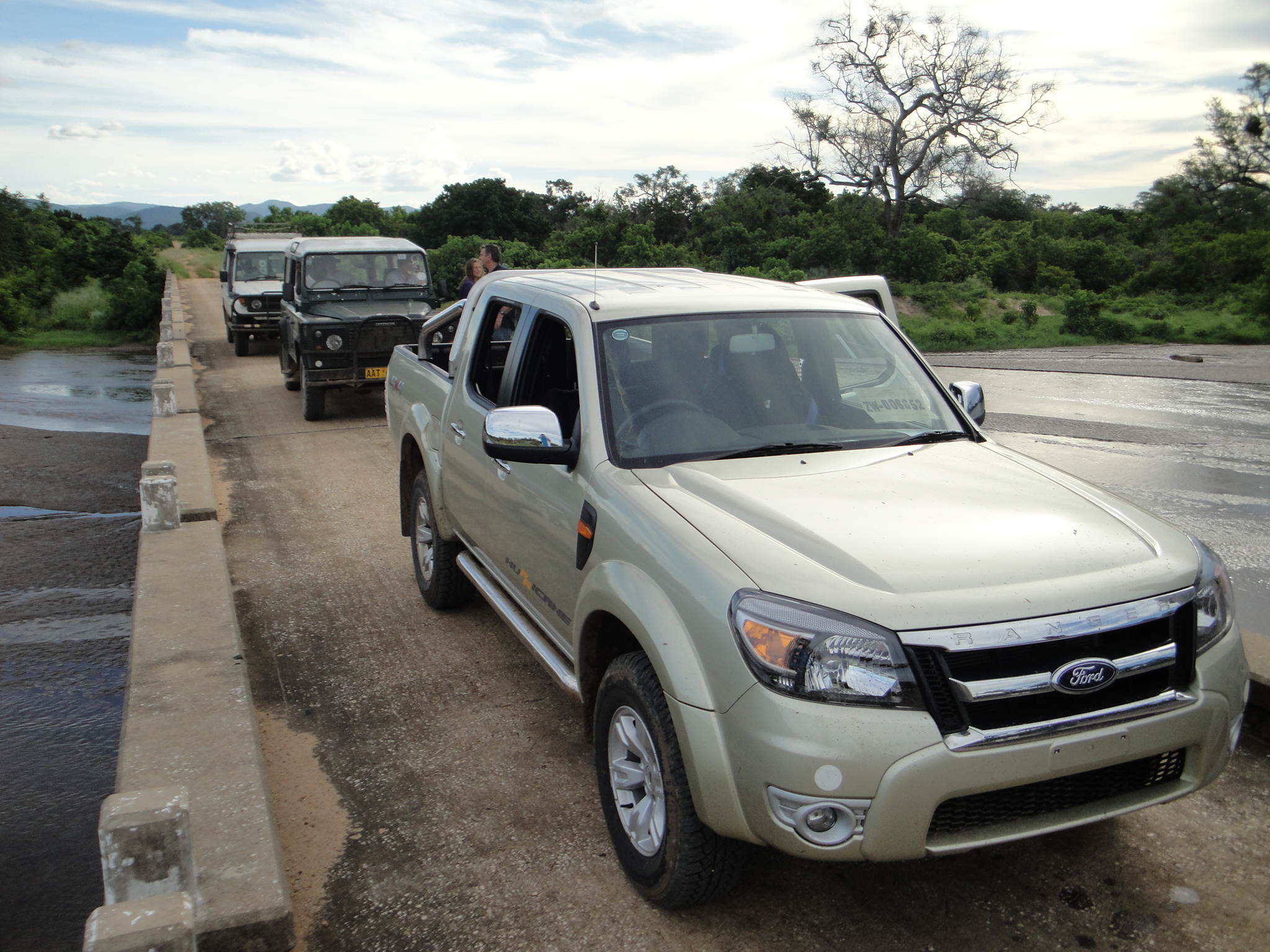
Bridge on the Rukomechi River near Nyakasikana Gate, Mana Pools National Park

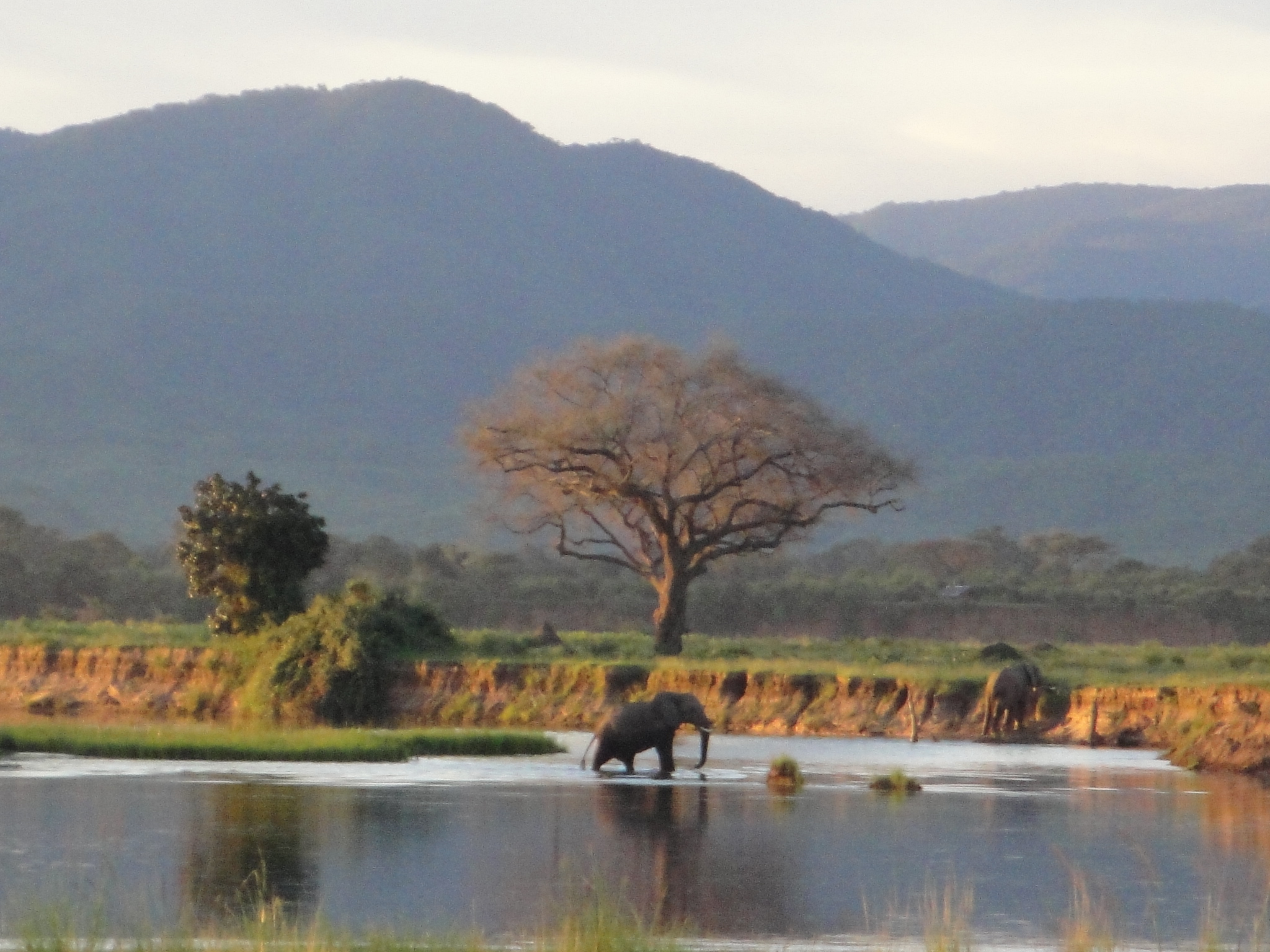
Zambezi River near Mutsango Lodge, Mana Pools National Park

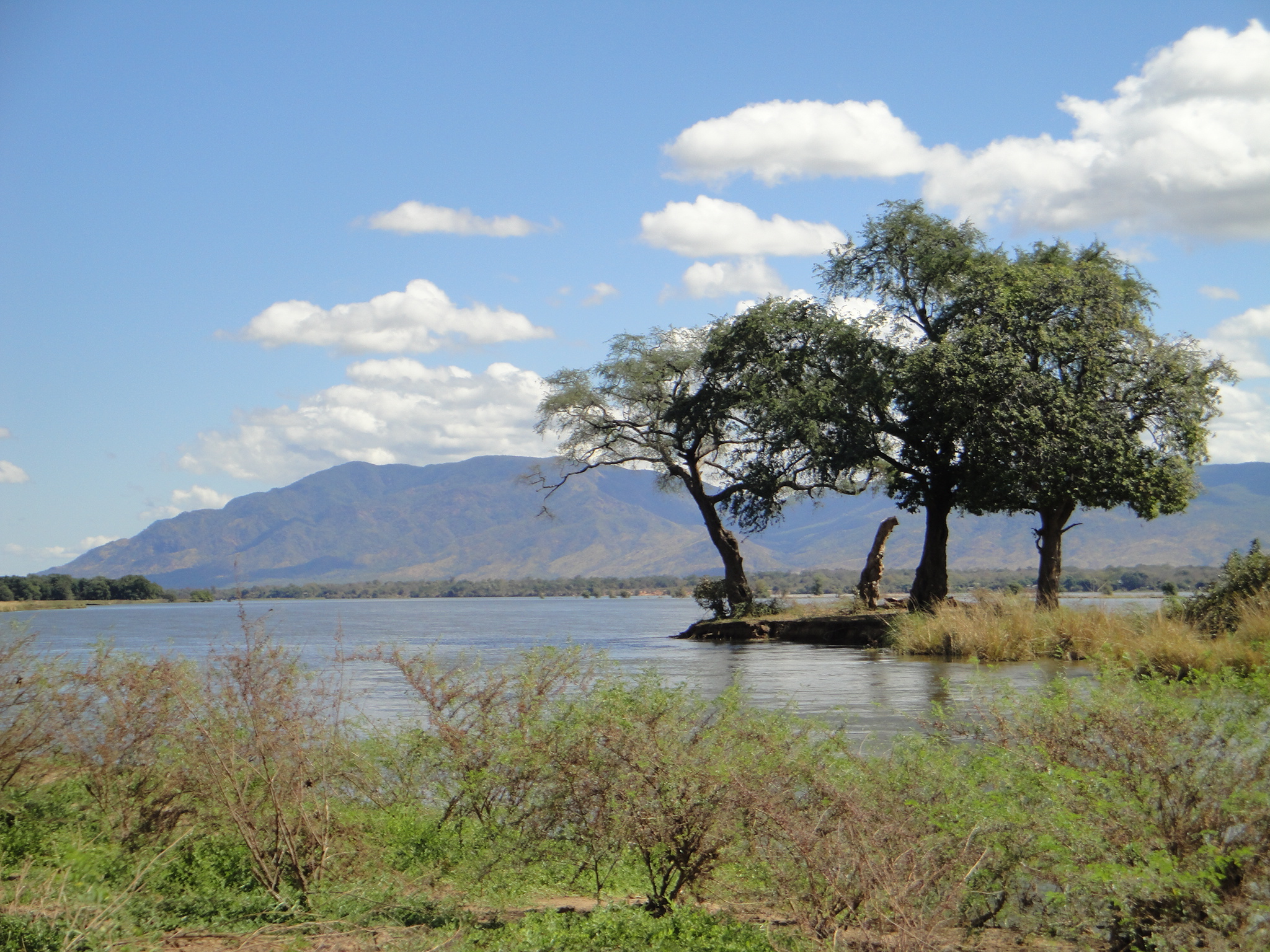
Looking across the Zambezi River to the Zambezi Escarpment, Zambia, from Mana Pools National Park

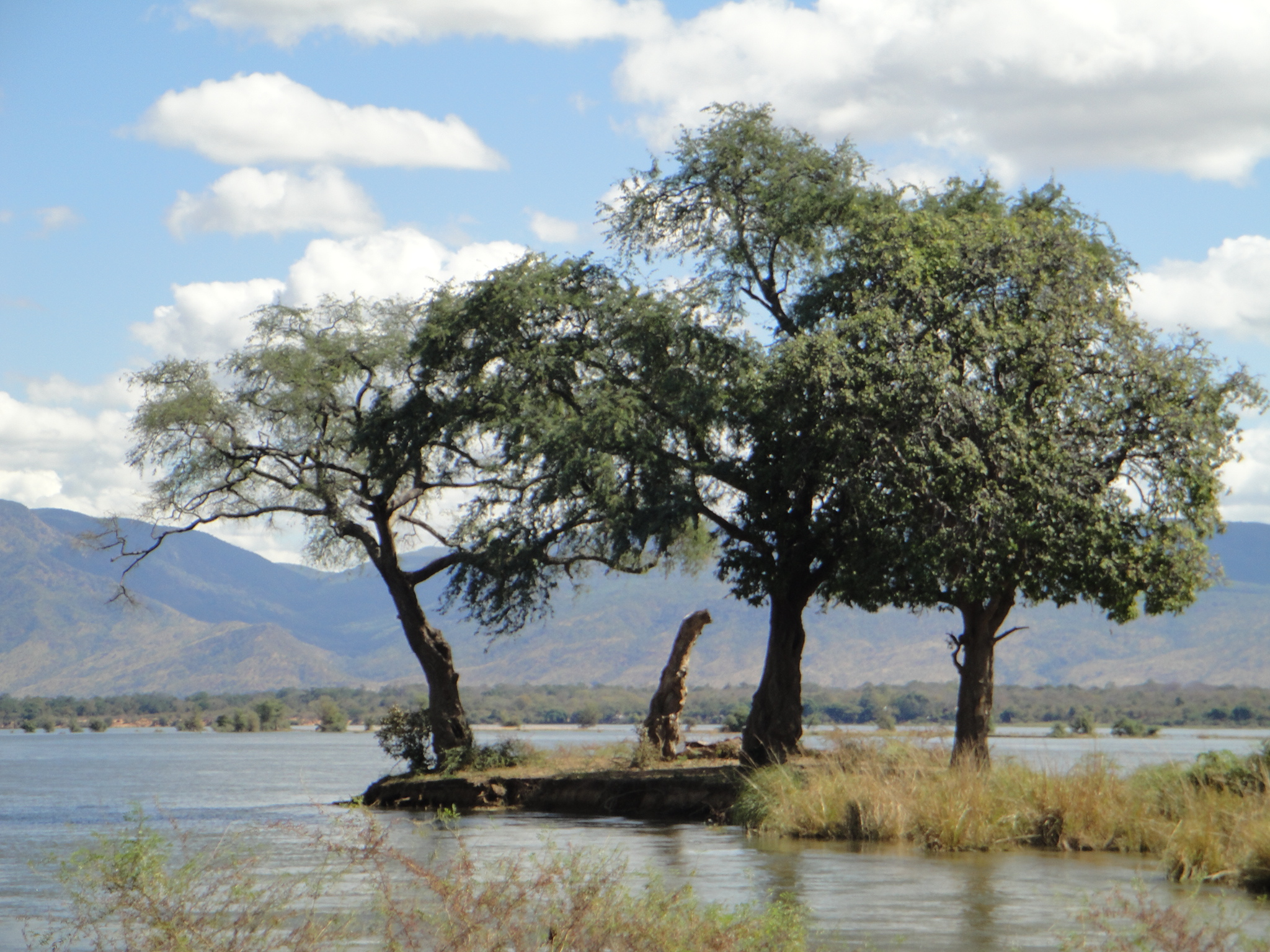
Island in the Zambezi River from Mana Pools National Park

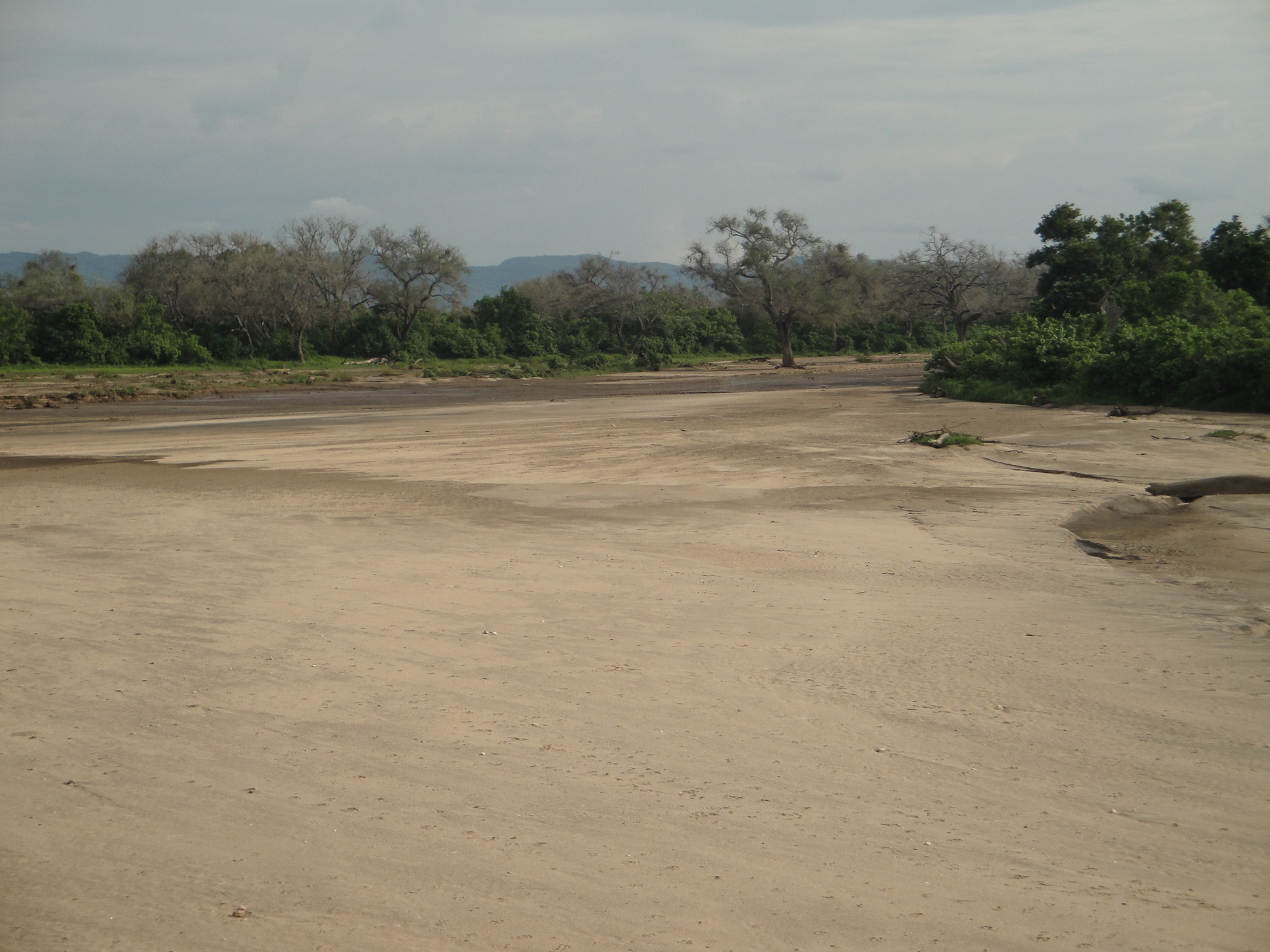
Rukomechi River from Nyakasikana Bridge, Mana Pools National Park
