= Kenneth Kermack =

Kenneth Alexander Kermack
- Born: 1919
- Died: 2000 (aged 80-81)
- Occupation: palaeontologist
- Scientific career
- Fields: Vertebrate palaeontology
- Workplaces: University College London
- Doctoral students: Colin Patterson, Susan E. Evans

Kenneth Alexander Kermack (1919 – 2000) was a British palaeontologist at University College London most notable for his work on early mammals with his wife, Doris Mary Kermack.

Among Kermack's other significant contributions was the observation that Diplodocus could not have had an aquatic lifestyle because sheer water pressure alone on its chest would have prevented it breathing whilst submerged.

He first described the early mammal Aegialodon dawsoni from a molar tooth and the docodont Simpsonodon oxfordensis. He was also interested in astronomy, elected a member of the British Astronomical Association on 23 February 1966, a member until his death in 2000.

== Selected publications ==
- Kermack, D. M., Kermack, K. A., and Mussett, F. 1968. The Welsh pantothere Kuehneotherium praecursoris. Journal of the Linnean Society of London, Zoology 47:407–423.
- Kermack, K. A., Mussett, F., and Rigney, H. W. 1973. The lower jaw of Morganucodon. Zoological Journal of the Linnean Society 53:87–175.
- Kermack, K. A., Mussett, F., and Rigney, H. W. 1981. The skull of Morganucodon. Zoological Journal of the Linnean Society 71:1–158.
- Kermack, K. 1989. Hearing in early mammals. Nature 341:568–569.
