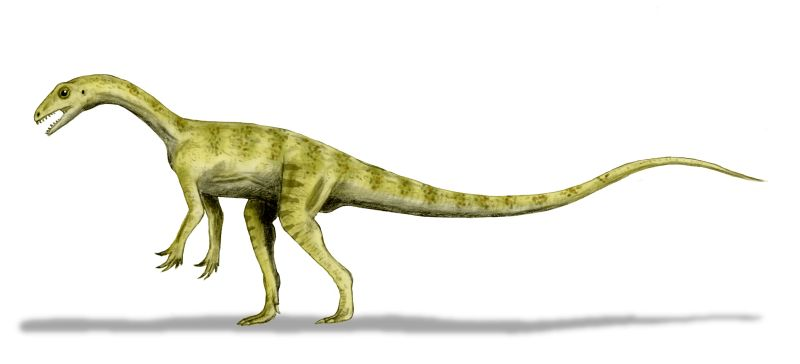
- Life reconstruction

Scientific classification
- Kingdom: Animalia
- Phylum: Chordata
- Class: Reptilia
- Clade: Dinosauria
- Clade: Saurischia
- Clade: †Sauropodomorpha
- Genus: †Pantydraco; Galton et al., 2007
- Species: †P. caducus

Binomial name
- †Pantydraco caducus (Yates, 2003) Galton et al., 2007

Synonyms
- Thecodontosaurus caducus Yates, 2003

= Pantydraco =

Pantydraco Temporal range: Late Triassic, 209–201 Ma

Extinct genus of dinosaurs

Pantydraco (where "panty-" is short for Pant-y-ffynnon, signifying hollow of the spring/well in Welsh, referring to the quarry at Bonvilston in South Wales where it was found) is a genus of basal sauropodomorph dinosaur from the Late Triassic of the United Kingdom (Wales). It is based on a partial juvenile skeleton once thought to belong to Thecodontosaurus. Only one valid species of Pantydraco is recognised: P. caducus.

== Description ==
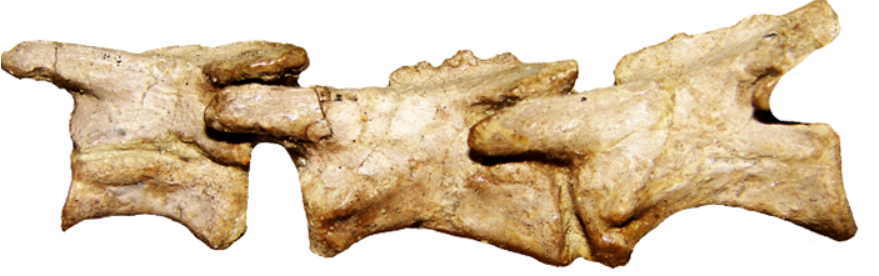
Cervical vertebrae of P. caducus

Pantydraco was of moderate build. The creature had a long tail that tapered towards the end and was broad at the hip joint. It had a pointed head with a strong jaw. The forelimbs of the dinosaur were developed for grasping while the hindlimbs were adapted for supporting the creature's body weight. The center of mass lies near the pelvic bone, suggesting the creature was bipedal. The forelimbs were shorter than the hindlimbs. The hands had three movable digits while the fourth digit was embedded. It had well-developed claws. The juvenile fossils’ estimated height is from about 0.7 to 1 metre (2 ft 4 in to 3 ft 3 in). Adults are believed to have been about three metres (9 ft 10 in) long. The estimated weight for an average adult of this species of dinosaurs is about 50 kilograms (110 lb). Thus, the creature was fairly gracile. The teeth were well developed.

== Discovery and naming ==
In 2003, Adam Yates named the new species Thecodontosaurus caducus for NHMUK PV RUP 24 (formerly BMNH P 24), a skull, a partial jawbone, and vertebrae of the cervix, an incomplete right pelvic bone, and partial forelimbs of an immature sauropodomorph that had been discovered in 1952 by Kermack and Robinson. This material had been known in the scientific literature since 1983, and had been used to represent the genus Thecodontosaurus. However, changed understanding of the relationships and characteristics of basal sauropodomorphs (also known as prosauropods) has led Peter Galton, Yates, and D. Kermack to give T. caducus its own genus. The genus was named after the Pant-y-ffynnon quarry where it was discovered.

Pantydraco takes its name from the "pant" of Pant-y-ffynnon quarry, meaning valley of the spring, and "draco" (a dragon or mythical dragon-like creature in Latin). This is because the quarry is located near Cowbridge in the Vale of Glamorgan, in Southern Wales, at the base of a mountain between two rivers. As 'y' means '(of) the' in Welsh, the genus name is somewhat grammatically incorrect. The species epithet, caducus, means "fallen" in Latin, referring to the assumption that it fell into a fissure fill (quarry) and died there.

== Paleobiology ==
Pantydraco is considered to have most probably been omnivorous, being at the transition from carnivory to herbivory in the sauropodomorph lineage. It is probable that Pantydraco would have walked bipedally.

== Paleoecology ==
The Pant-y-ffynnon region was a characteristic wetland during the Triassic. The area consists of alluvial silts deposited by the rivers and sand and limestone. The climate ranges from arid to semi-humid.
