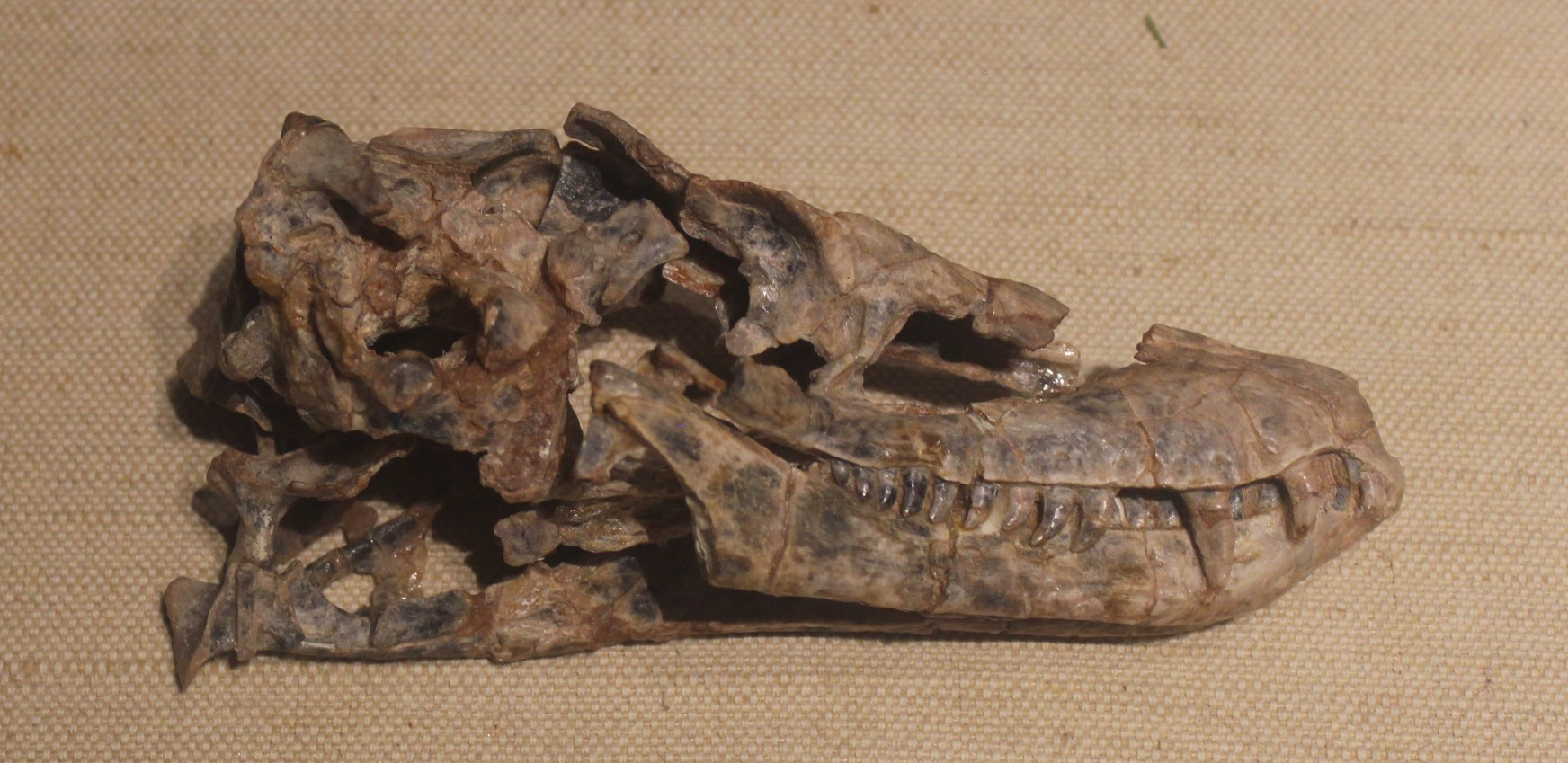
- Holotype skull (IVPP V14010), Paleozoological Museum of China

Scientific classification
- Kingdom: Animalia
- Phylum: Chordata
- Class: Reptilia
- Clade: Pseudosuchia
- Clade: Crocodylomorpha
- Clade: Solidocrania
- Genus: †Junggarsuchus; Clark et al., 2004

Type species
- †Junggarsuchus sloani Clark et al., 2004

= Junggarsuchus =

Junggarsuchus Temporal range: Late Jurassic ~163.5 to 162.2 Ma - Oxfordian

Extinct genus of reptiles

Junggarsuchus (/ˌdʒəŋɡərˈsukəs/) is an extinct genus of sphenosuchian crocodylomorph from the Middle or Late Jurassic period of China. The type and only species is J. sloani. The generic name of Junggarsuchus comes from the Junggar Basin (the anglicization of Dzungar), where the fossil was found, and the Greek word "souchos" meaning crocodile. The specific name, "sloani" is in honor of C. Sloan, who is credited with finding the holotype.

== Discovery ==
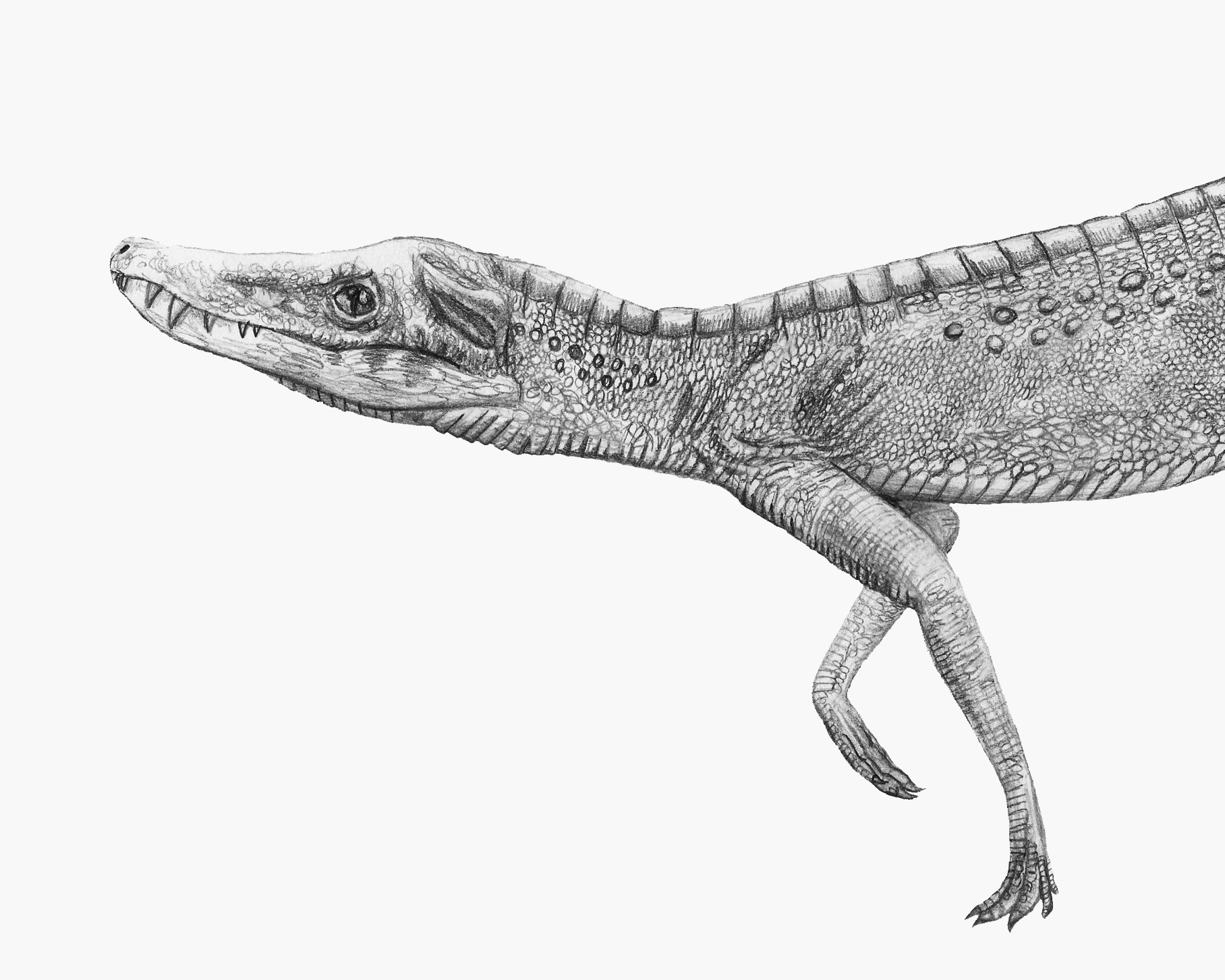
Life reconstruction of Junggarsuchus with hypothetical osteoderms

Junggarsuchus was found in the upper part of the Lower Member of the Shishugou Formation in Xinjiang, China at the Wucaiwan locality. The type and only specimen was described in 2004 by James Clark, Xu Xing, Catherine Forester, and Yuan Wang in Nature, but it did not receive a full osteological description until 2022 when Alexander Ruebenstahl, Michael Klein, and Yi Hongyu published a monograph along with two of the original describers James Clark and Xu Xing.

It is a relatively small animal, with the skull of the holotype only measuring 144 millimetres (5.7 in) in length. The right forelimb was about 29 centimetres (11 in) long from the shoulder to the metacarpals. This would make the animal in life only about the size of a domestic cat. However, its overall length is unknown because the holotype only preserves a single vertebra from the tail.

The holotype, given the designation IVPP 14010, consists of an almost complete skull with an intact brain-case and lower jaws, most of the left forelimb, the proximal ends of the ulna and radius of the right forelimb along with the right humerus, fifteen cervical and dorsal vertebrae along with most of the ribcage, and an associated caudal vertebra. Most of the skeleton was fully articulated, with some elements being found in association and disarticulated. More of the specimen had yet to be prepared at the time of the monograph's publication, and some of the bones remained obscured by the matrix at the time of its re-description.

The skull of the holotype was transported from the Institute of Vertebrate Paleontology and Paleoanthropology, where it was initially reposited, to George Washington University, where it was studied and comprehensively re-described by Ruebenstahl and colleagues using modern CT imaging technology. The preparation of the skeleton was so exquisite that elements of the skeleton which had been damaged during fossilization were able to be glued together by the preparators with very little unconformity.

== Description ==
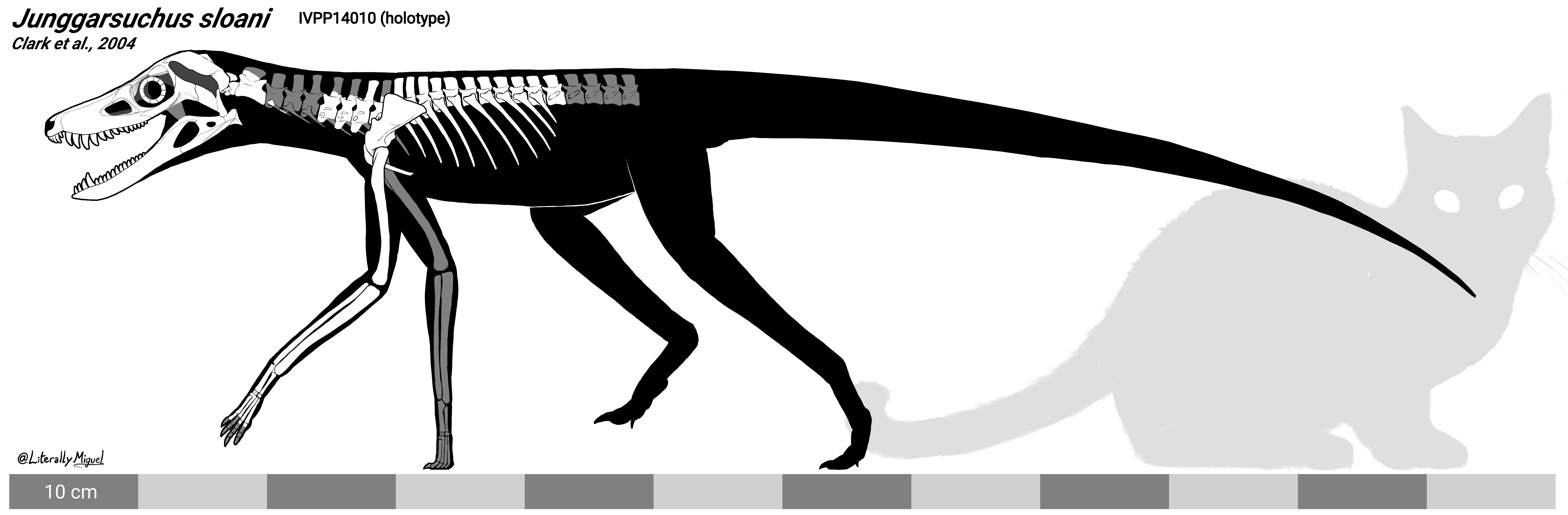
Skeletal reconstruction and size comparison, preserved material in white

In their initial description of the skull, Clark and colleagues noted that there was very little cranial kinesis and there were attachment sites for very powerful jaw muscles, which are derived traits found in modern crocodilians. With regard to the post-cranial skeleton, they noted that the spine of the holotype probably had very low vertical mobility across its length and it was mostly adapted for lateral motion, consistent with modern crocodilians. However, a very significant difference between Junggarsuchus and its modern relatives was the complete lack of osteoderms in the specimen, despite the lack of spinal mobility, when these traits were presumed to have co-evolved. They suggest that the lack of preserved osteoderms may be a product of the taphonomic conditions of the specimen, or that it may have been a juvenile when it died.

As in other sphenosuchians, the limbs of Junggarsuchus were adapted to terrestrial locomotion (movement on land), rather than the semi-aquatic locomotion seen in living crocodilians. These adaptations include: a vertically orientated upper arm bone, ball-and-socket shoulder joint, and a functionally tridactyl (three-fingered) hand due to a reduction of digit 5 and the absence of digit 1. However, the fact that these terrestrial adaptations appear to be common to Junggarsuchus and to more basal animals like Saltoposuchus, means that this probably represents the ancestral condition in crocodylomorphs, rather than a derived trait of "sphenosuchians", and the semi-aquatic adaptations of the crown group only appeared much later in their evolution.

=== Skull ===
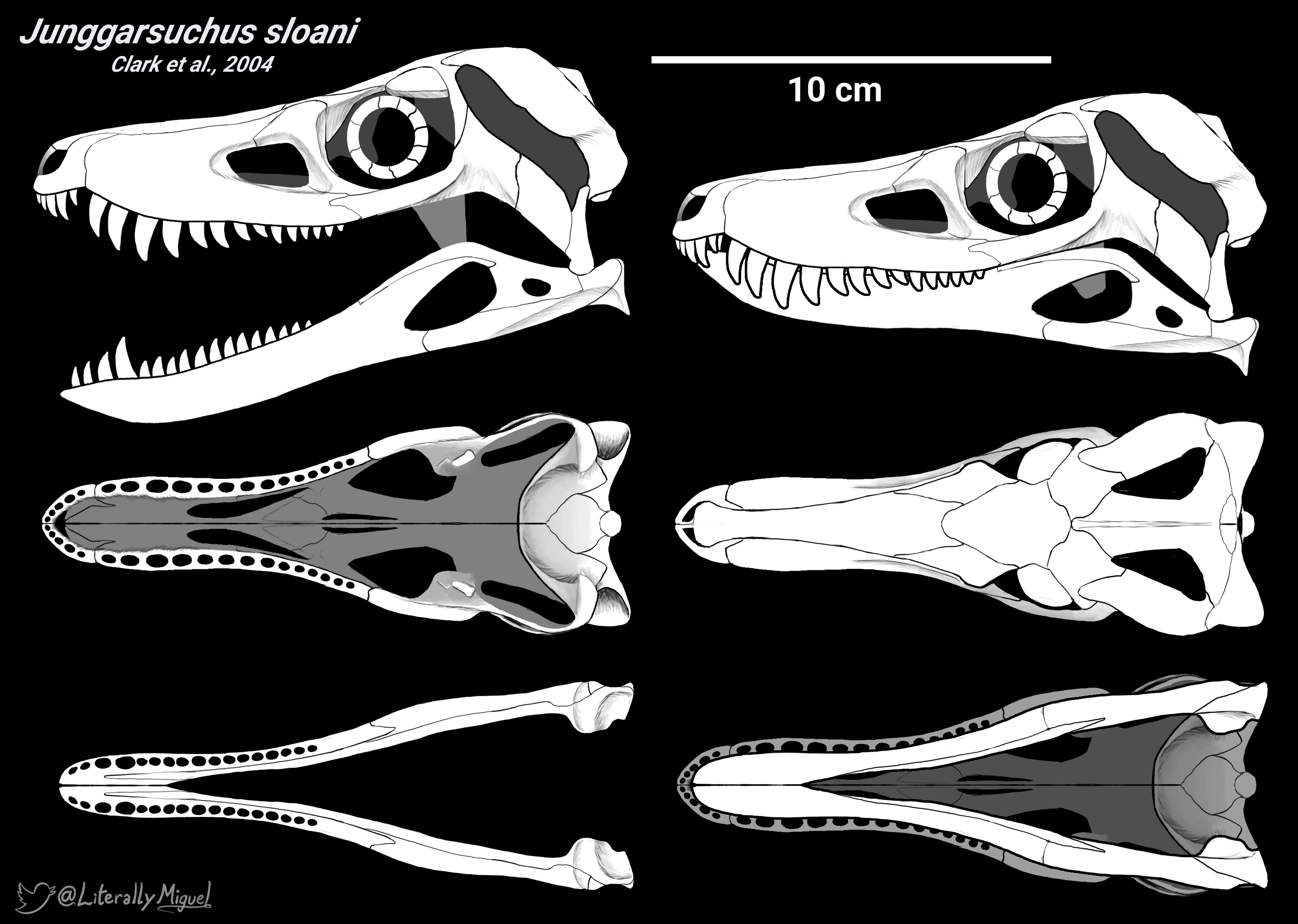
Skull reconstruction

The specializations observed in the skull of Junggarsuchus are primarily related to the reinforcement of the skull's structure and the development of stronger jaw musculature. Diapsid skulls are ancestrally relatively lightweight, and so to deliver high bite forces without damaging the skull requires significant specializations. This can be seen in the dinosaur Tyrannosaurus, which has a completely fused nasal bone (the bone on the dorsal midline of the snout), whereas most other theropods have sutures in the topology of the bone in that location. Several of the skull's fenestrae have been reduced in size compared to other early crocodylomorphs, most notably the antorbital fenestra and the supratemporal fenestra. In addition, several of the bones of the palate have become enlarged when compared with more basal crocodylomorphs. The quadrate bone is also much closer to the laterosphenoid bone and there is no suture between the parietal bones. Both of these reduce the flexibility of the skull, which has been suggested to enable greater bite forces to be introduced without damaging the skull. However, this trend of an increasing robustness of the skull is not uniform, and two notable adaptations which buck this trend are the appearance of an additional fenestra in the quadrate and a lack of significant contact between the nasal and lacrimal bones. While most of the skull characteristics demonstrate the intermediate placement of Junggarsuchus on the family tree of crocodylomorphs, there are several entirely novel adaptations that the skull shows. The lateral surface of the angular bone has extensive attachment sites for jaw musculature, which is seen in some crown crocodilians, but not in other intermediate forms. This, like several other adaptations, most likely aided in delivering higher bite forces to potential prey items.

Another notable trait of the skull of Junggarsuchus is the appearance of pneumatic spaces in the quadrate, the parabasisphenoid, and possibly the pterygoid. While this seemingly contradicts the trend of skull solidification in Junggarsuchus and related taxa (basal solidocranians), Ruebenstahl and colleagues suggest that it is possible that these pneumatic spaces enabled the tissues of the skull to withstand and absorb shocks that would otherwise damage a structure made of solid bone. However, the authors note that this is only inferred, and the evolution of cranial pneumaticity in crocodylomorphs may instead reflect the invasion of these tissues by cranial sinuses. Poor preservation of the pterygoid of the holotype also makes it difficult to infer the exact degree of pneumaticity or to speculate with regard to any of its possible functions.

Notably, the inner ear anatomy of Junggarsuchus shows significant terrestrial adaptations. The semicircular canal is tall and narrow, unlike in aquatic crocodilians, which is believed to have aided the animal in the orientation of the head and the gaze. This would have been necessary to hunt terrestrial prey and to maintain balance while moving on land.

Despite the exceptional preservation of the skull, there are a few key areas where the arrangement of the skull bones is uncertain due to deformation or damage that the skull suffered during the fossilization process. These areas are the contact between the angular and surangular bones and the contact between the squamosal and postorbital bones. Based on CT data, Ruebenstahl and colleagues suggest that it is likely that the surangular is short in the jaw of Junggarsuchus and does not have significant contact with the angular. However, it is possible that the surangular has significant contact across a significant length of both the articular and angular bones, which would make it similar to the condition of its close relative Dibothrosuchus.

The other uncertainty is in regard to the contacts between the quadrate and the postorbital bones in the rear of the skull. Breaks in the bone as it was being preserved make it difficult to distinguish which fractures are reflective of taphonomic damage and which ones are reflective of actual sutures on the bone. The authors hypothesize that the postorbital only contributes to the dorsal ridge of the supratemporal fenestra, although they consider the possibility that the postorbital extends down the posterior ridge of the fenestra, running parallel to the squamosal rather than meeting it straightforwardly.

=== Post-cranial skeleton ===
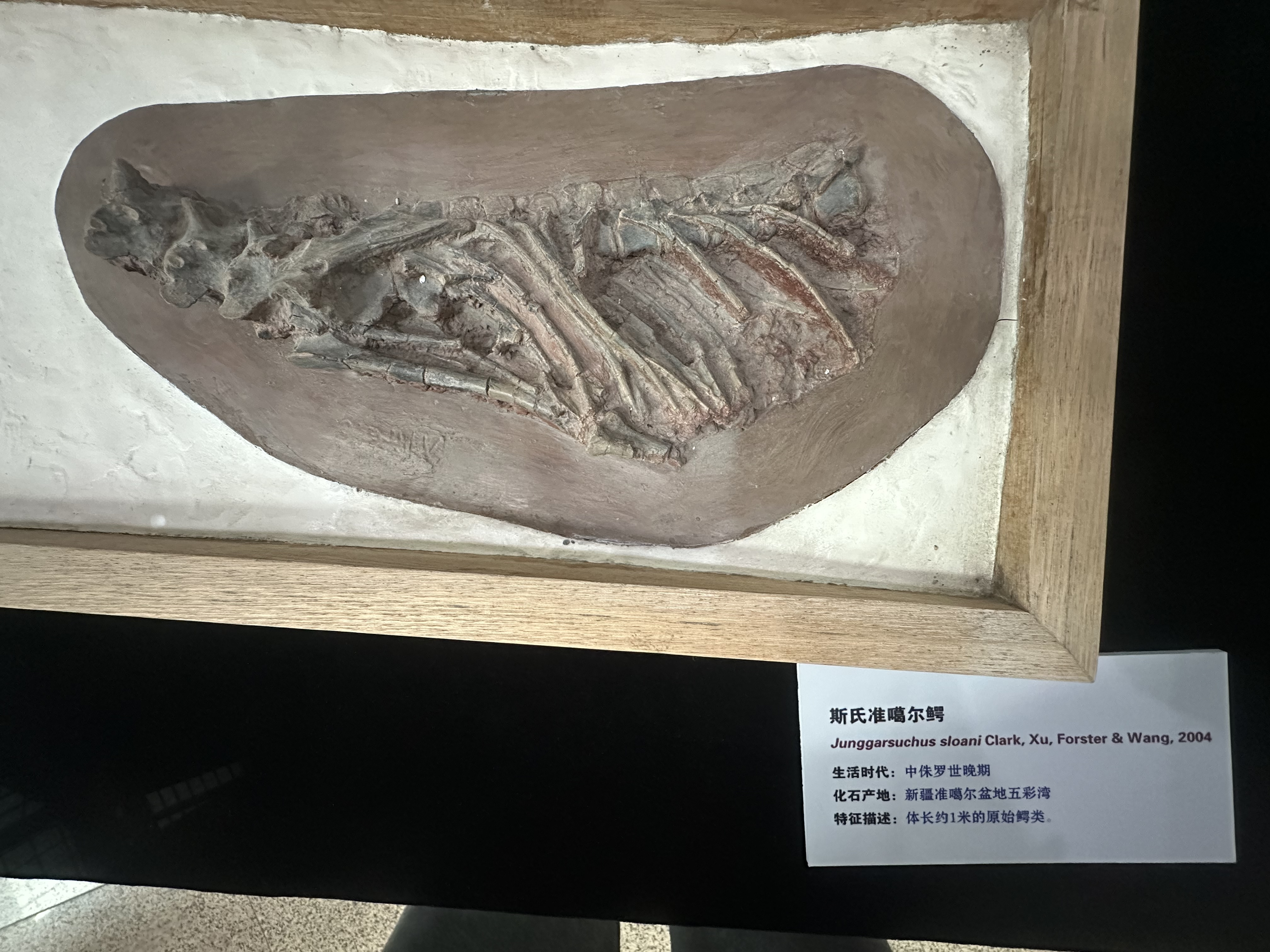
Postcranial bones

Junggarsuchus displays numerous adaptations for cursoriality. These include the reduction of the number of digits in contact with the ground from five, which is the ancestral condition in pseudosuchians, to only three in the forelimbs of Junggarsuchus. The reduction of the outer digits such that they are not in contact with the ground has been previously recognized to be a trend conserved among cursorial tetrapods, and digits one and five are very reduced in Junggarsuchus. Other limb specializations include an enlarged surface on the anterior edge of the scapula, which has been interpreted as a site for expanded muscle attachments to aid in limb retraction. The joints of the shoulders and limb bones also appear to be generally oriented in such a way that the limbs would be held directly underneath the body and would have the ability to flex underneath the body of the animal. This distal bones of the arm (the ulna and radius) are also much longer relative to the humerus than in other archosaurs (though they are still not as long as the humerus). This has been interpreted as an additional indication of cursoriality in other crocodylomorphs. The hind limbs are not preserved in the holotype, so it is not certain if the femur, tibia, and fibula also exhibit this relationship.

The notable lack of osteoderms which, in the original description, was suggested to be purely taphonomic, is suggested by later authors to be reflective of a genuine lack of these features as part of a general trend towards more terrestrial mobility and flexibility which is not seen in the modern relatives of Junggarsuchus. Characteristics of the spine including the zygapophyses are suggestive of a much more flexible overall range of motion that most modern crocodiles lack completely. This level of terrestrial flexibility is common in early-diverging crocodylomorphs as well as archosaurs in general. Most of the close relatives of Junggarsuchus suich as Dibothrosuchus, Terrestrisuchus, and Dromicosuchus are similarly gracile and adapted for fast terrestrial movement. This suggests that the aquatic adaptations seen in modern crocodiles, as well as in many of their extinct relatives, like the thalattosuchians, are not the ancestral condition of this group.

Nothing is known about the hind limbs, hips, or tail of Junggarsuchus because the holotype, which is the only known specimen, does not preserve these elements. However, there may be elements of the holotype which have yet to be prepared which could reveal information about these areas of the skeleton once the rock has been removed and any new bones have been described.

== Classification ==
The original description of Junggarsuchus by James A. Clark and colleagues found it to be the sister taxon to the clade Crocodyliformes and also found that the traditional grouping, Sphenosuchia, was not a monophyletic group, but rather formed a large polytomy with a grade basal to crocodyliformes. Synapomorphies of the Junggarsuchus-crocodyliformes clade in their analysis included: exoccipitals that meet on the midline above the foramen magnum, a large extension on the bottom sides of the exoccipitals which contacts the quadrate, jugal bones which are strongly arched, a narrowing of the rear portion of the parietal bone, and a fenestra in the quadrate bone. Their analysis is shown below.

- Suchia
  - Gracilisuchidae
  - - Aetosauria
    - - Rauisuchia
      - - Erpetosuchidae
        - Crocodylomorpha
          - Pseudhesperosuchus
          - Terrestrisuchus
          - Hesperosuchus
          - Saltoposuchus
          - Kayentasuchus
          - Dromicosuchus
          - Litargosuchus
          - - Sphenosuchus
            - - Dibothrosuchus
              - - Junggarsuchus
                - Crocodyliformes

In 2017, Juan Martin Leardi and colleagues redescribed the closely related taxon, Macelognathus which had originally been described by O. C. Marsh in 1884 as a species of dinosaur. They used the same data set as Clark and colleagues, but their analysis included many more taxa including the recently described taxa Almadasuchus and Carnufex. They recover a slightly more well-resolved phylogenetic tree, with the exception of a polytomy at the base. Their analysis is notable for including Junggarsuchus as being slightly more basal than a monophyletic Hallopodidae. Synapomorphies of the clade including Junggarsuchus, Hallopodidae, and crocodyliformes include the following: an expanded basisphenoid bone, exoccipital bones which contact the quadrate, an enclosed passage for the internal carotid arteries, a large post-temporal fenestra enclosed by the squamosal and the exoccipital bones, and a radius which is shorter than the humerus. They also recover Macelognathus as a close relative of Hallopus. Other authors have suggested that this is difficult to corroborate or even disputed this result because Macelognathus is known mostly from skull material and Hallopus does not have any of its skull preserved. The results of their analysis are shown below.

- Crocodylomorpha
  - Carnufex
  - Redondavenator
  - CM 73372
  - Erpetosuchus
  - - - Pseudhesperosuchus
      - Trialestes
    - - - Saltoposuchus
        - - Terrestrisuchus
          - Litargosuchus
      - - - Hesperosuchus
          - - Dromicosuchus
            - Kayentasuchus
        - - Sphenosuchus
          - - Dibothrosuchus
            - - Junggarsuchus
              - - Hallopodidae
                  - Almadasuchus
                  - - Hallopus
                    - Macelognathus
                - Crocodyliformes
                  - - Hemiprotosuchus
                    - Protosuchus
                  - - Orthosuchus
                    - - Gobiosuchus
                      - - Sichuanosuchus
                        - - Zosuchus
                          - Mesoeucrocodylia

In their re-description, Ruebenstahl and colleagues recovered a new clade, Solidocrania, meaning "solid skulls", in reference to the lack of cranial kinesis. This clade was defined at the least inclusive clade which contains Junggarsuchus, Macelognathus, and Almadasuchus. The results of their phylogeny showed these three taxa to form a grade basal to Crocodyliformes, and thus Crocodyliformes itself would be included within Solidocrania. Synapomorphies of this clade were reported to be: two large palpebral bones, a squamosal bone which contacts the rear surface of the quadrate bone, an enclosure of the cranioquadrate canal by the squamosal and occipital bones, a convergence of the laterosphenoid and the quadrate, a contact between the otoccipital and the quadrate, an expansive and pneumatic parabasisphenoid, a developed ridge on the back of the ectopterygoid projecting along the interior surface of the jugal bone, a front edge of the scapular blade which is larger than the rear edge, and a low olecranon process of the ulna. Additional synapomorphies were suggested, but these were more weakly supported. The results of their phylogenetic analysis, calculated by finding a strict consensus of the two most parsimonious trees, are shown below.

- Crocodylomorpha
  - Carnufex
  - - Hesperosuchus
    - - - Trialestes
        - Pseudhesperosuchus
      - - Kayentasuchus
        - Dromicosuchus
        - - Terrestrisuchus
          - - Redondavenator
            - Litargosuchus
        - - Sphenosuchus
          - - Dibothrosuchus
            - - Hallopus
              - Solidocrania
                - - Phyllodontosuchus
                  - Junggarsuchus
                - - Macelognathus
                  - - Almadasuchus
                    - Crocodyliformes
                      - - Orthosuchus
                        - - Hemiprotosuchus
                          - - Protosuchus
                            - UCMP 97638 125871
                      - - - Gobiosuchus
                          - Zaraasuchus
                        - - - Sichuanosuchus
                            - Shantungosuchus
                          - - - Zosuchus
                              - - Nominosuchus
                                - Fruitachampsa
                            - - Hsisosuchus
                              - - Ziphosuchia
                                - - - Calsoyasuchus
                                    - Thalattosuchia
                                  - Neosuchia

Novel results of this phylogeny included finding Hallopodidae to be polyphyletic as well as the taxon Calsoyasuchus to be the sister taxon of Thalattosuchia, when it has traditionally been considered to be a goniopholid. Phyllodontosuchus was also found to be the sister taxon to Junggarsuchus, although this was weakly supported because Phyllodontosuchus is only known from a single, heavily deformed skull and associated teeth, and its placement in the authors' phylogeny varied considerably in regard to its affinities. The authors also noted that Hsisosuchus, generally considered to be basal to the ziphosuchian-neosuchian split, may actually be more closely related to ziphosuchians.

The three taxa that define Solidocrania, Junggarsuchus, Macelognathus, and Almadasuchus, are all Late Jurassic in age, yet they are all believed to be more basal than Crocodyliformes, which are known to have originated in the Late Triassic. Ruebenstahl and colleagues state that this finding implies that there is a 50 million-year-long ghost lineage of solidocranian taxa that stretches back into the Triassic. If their hypothesis is correct, this would mean that Junggarsuchus and its relatives represent some of the last surviving non-crocodyliform crocodylomorphs. However, the authors are careful to note that, given the late appearance of Junggarsuchus and other basal solidocranian taxa, it is possible that Solidocrania is not a natural clade and that the uniting skull characteristics could be a secondarily derived trait that is a result of convergent evolution rather than traits inherited from a shared common ancestor with crocodyliformes.

== Paleobiology ==
In 2023, Emily Lessner, Kathleen Dollman, James Clark, Xu Xing, and Casey Holliday performed an analysis of pseudosuchian facial nerves using skull material from over 20 different taxa including Junggarsuchus. One of their findings was that Junggarsuchus was among the earliest-diverging crocodylomorphs to have a linear arrangement of foramina below the teeth of the lower jaw. All of the earlier-diverging taxa had these foramina arranged randomly.

Their analysis concluded by noticing a marked trend in the tactile sensitivity of pseudosuchian snouts as they evolved, with successively more derived groups possessing increasing density of nerves along the snout. These nerves are used to detect motion in the water by modern crocodilians, but the study concluded that the increase in these nerves predates the evolution of semiaquatic crocodyliformes. One possible explanation for this apparent discrepancy that the authors suggest is that earlier-diverging terrestrial crocodylomorphs may have exhibited a feeding ecology that included foraging on or near the ground for prey. Junggarsuchus is a notable outlier in this trend because the inferred density of these nerves is much lower than in comparable taxa such as Macelognathus and Litargosuchus. However, the authors do not state any possible implications this may have for the feeding ecology of Junggarsuchus specifically.

== Paleoecology ==
=== Diet ===
Junggarsuchus was almost certainly carnivorous, like most other crocodylomorphs. It possessed xiphodont teeth with serrations which were adapted for cutting through flesh. However, this presumption is complicated by the closely related taxon Phyllodontosuchus, which possessed heterodont teeth. Heterodonty is an adaptation that is uncommon in reptiles, and when it has appeared (e.g. in Pakasuchus and Chimaerasuchus), it has been assumed to be an adaptation to novel feeding strategies. Similarly, although not as strikingly, the teeth of Macelognathus are non-serrated on the crowns and their mandibular symphysis is entirely toothless, which has been interpreted as an adaptation for herbivory. Junggarsuchus does not share any such adaptations; it has more traditionally serrated teeth which extend all the way to the end of the dentary and premaxilla. The reason for this dramatic variation in these closely related taxa is uncertain, and may be reflective of the scarcity and relative incompleteness of the remains of these taxa, which only allows for limited comparisons to be drawn between them.

There is no direct evidence to indicate exactly what the diet of Junggarsuchus may have consisted of, but given its size and dentition, most authors have stated that the most reasonable assumption is that it was a pursuit predator of small vertebrate prey. Furthermore, the overall shape of the skull and the ratio of its height to width (i.e. its "flatness") has been shown to be more similar to modern crocodilians than it is to contemporary crocodylomorphs. This is related to muscle attachment sites for the medial pterygoid muscle, which is an important muscle used in closing the jaws, which meant that Junggarsuchus may have been adapted to catching small prey. In total, the indirect evidence seems to indicate the Junggarsuchus most likely fed on small animals like primitive mammals, squamates, and possibly hatchling dinosaurs.

=== Paleoenvironment ===
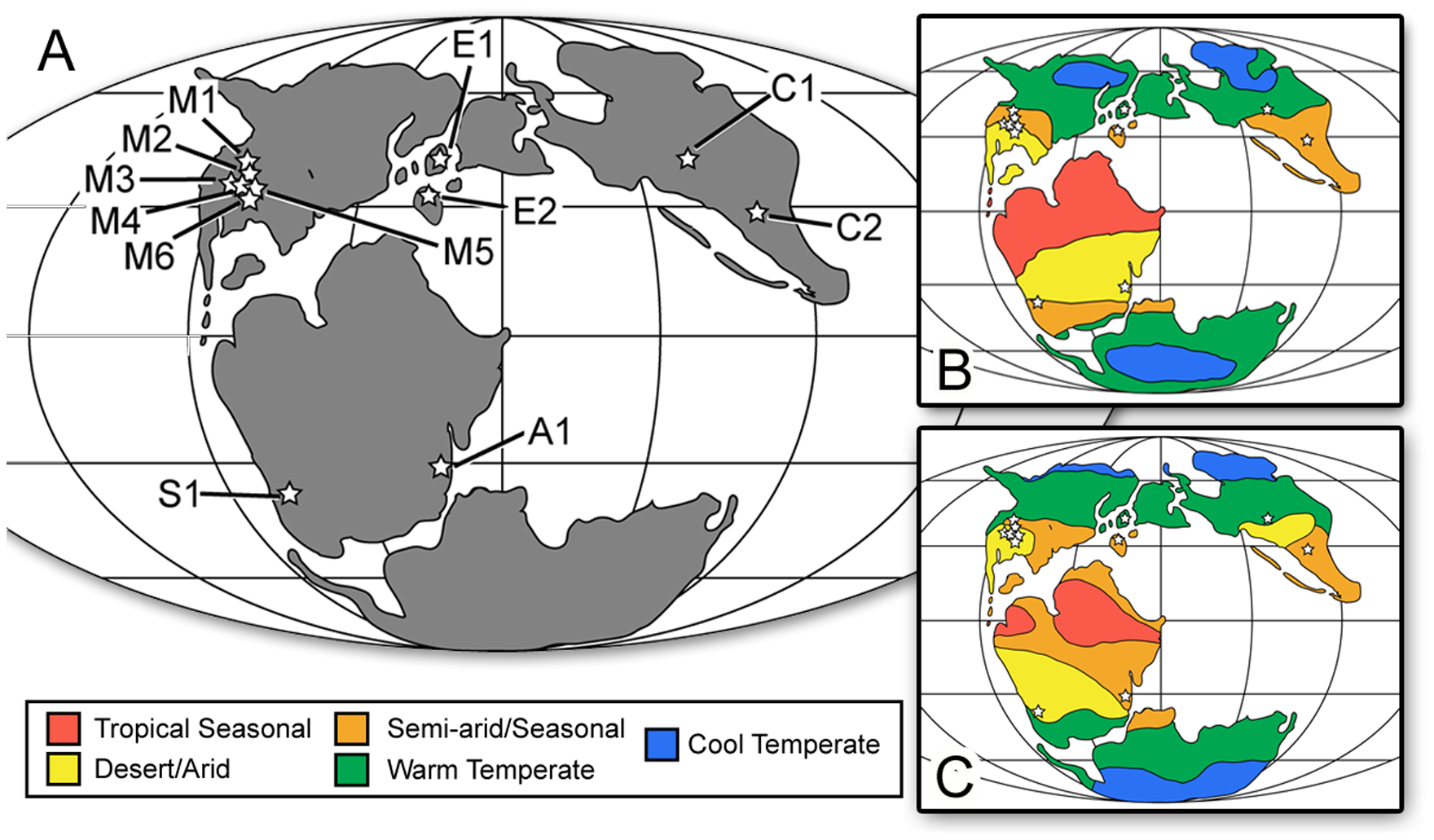
A climatological map of the world during the middle to late Jurassic, with the Shishugou Formation labeled "C1"

The only remains of Junggarsuchus so far described were discovered near the town of Wucaiwan in Xinjiang, China. This locality is a part of the lower member of the Shishugou Formation, which ranges from 164 to 159 million years ago. This interval spans the transition from the Middle Jurassic to the Late Jurassic, though most of it has been recently dated to the Late Jurassic. This region is inland and arid today, but in the Late Jurassic, it formed a coastal basin on the northern shores of the Tethys Ocean.

The lower (or Wucaiwan) member of the Shishugou consists primarily of red mudstone and sandstone deposits. This is interpreted to have consisted of a wooded alluvial fan environment which experienced periodic flooding, which accounts for the wide variety of small-bodied animal fossils preserved in the area as well as the abundance of fossilized trees. The Wucaiwan member preserves fossils of lungfish, amphibians, crocodilians, tritylodonts, and dinosaurs of various sizes. However, the upper portions of this member, where Junggarsuchus was found, are believed to have consisted of more traditional fluvial or wetland environments with less-intense flooding than the lower portions of the member. The climate of the area during the Late Jurassic was temperate and seasonally wet and dry. This pattern of rainfall led to the prominence of seasonal mires, possibly exacerbated by substrate liquefaction by the footfalls of massive sauropods which created "death pits" that trapped and buried small animals.

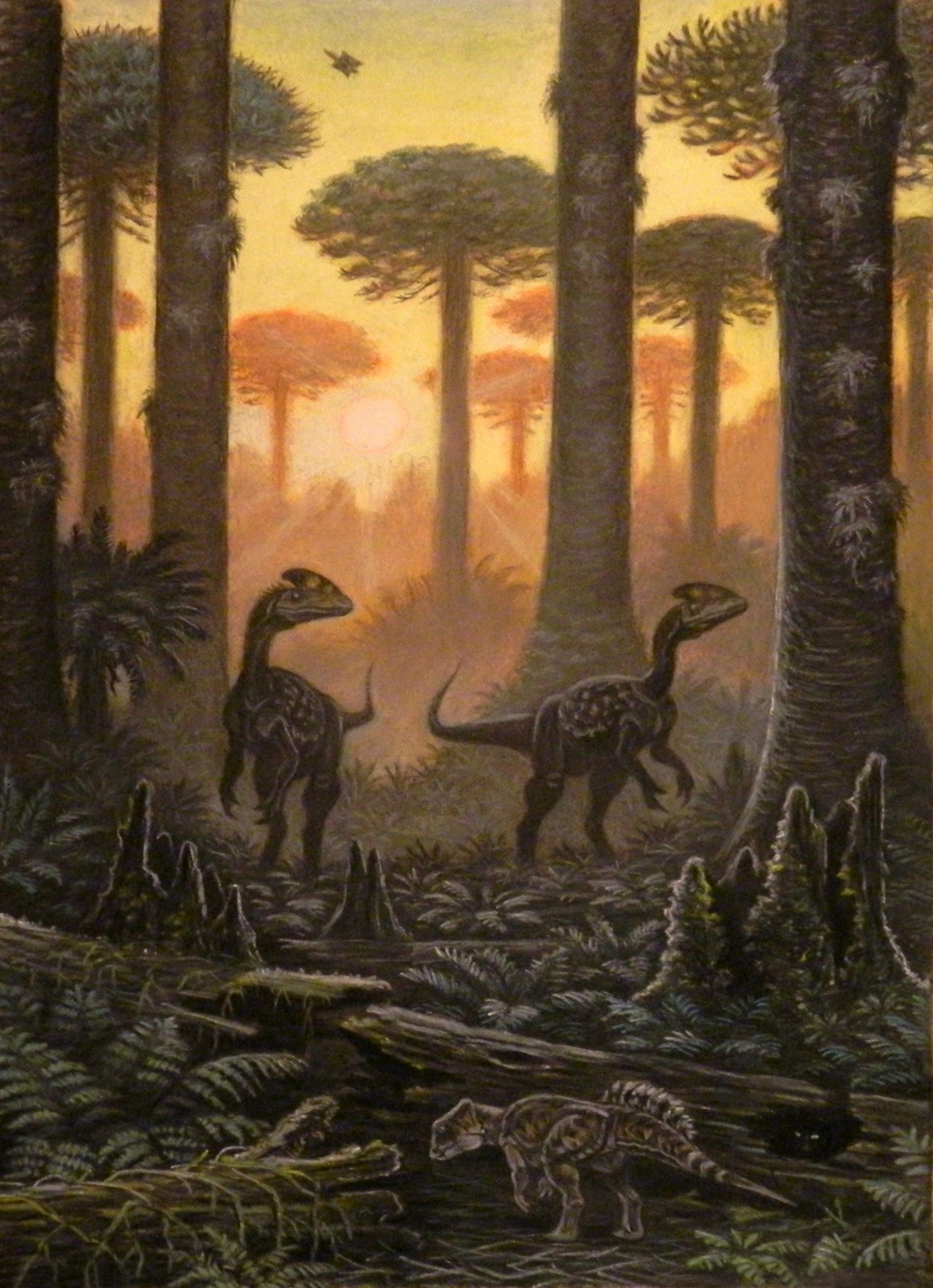
A depiction of some of the animals of the Shishugou Formation in their environment

There have also been significant volcanic ash deposits found in the Wucaiwan member, indicating that volcanic activity in the western part of China was increasing at this time.

=== Contemporary fauna ===
A variety of small animals have been uncovered from the Shishugou Formation. Various remains of small animals have been referred to various groups but have yet to be given binomial names. These include remains of lungfish, brachyopoid amphibians, docodont and tritylodont mammaliamorphs, lizards, and turtles. Some of these are preserved almost completely and in articulation. There is also a small crocodylomorph which may be related to Junggarsuchus that has yet to receive a formal description or name. Various dinosaur remains that have not yet been named have also been recovered from the area. These include stegosaurs, ankylosaurs, ornithopods, tetanurans, and a putative ornithomimosaur.

Named fossils include the primitive mammal-relative Yuanotherium, the crocodyliformes Sunosuchus and Nominosuchus, and the pterosaurs Sericipterus and Kryptodrakon. Dinosaurs are the most common and diverse part of the terrestrial fauna found in the Shishugou. They are represented by small ornithischians such as Yinlong, Hualianceratops, and "Eugongbusaurus" as well as by the sauropods Klamelisaurus, Bellusaurus, and Mamenchisaurus sinocanadorum. All large terrestrial predators in the ecosystem were theropods. These ranged from small coelurosaurs like Haplocheirus, Aorun, and Guanlong to large carnosaurs like Sinraptor. Also notable in the area was the small ceratosaur Limusaurus, which was preserved in one of the muddy "death pits".
