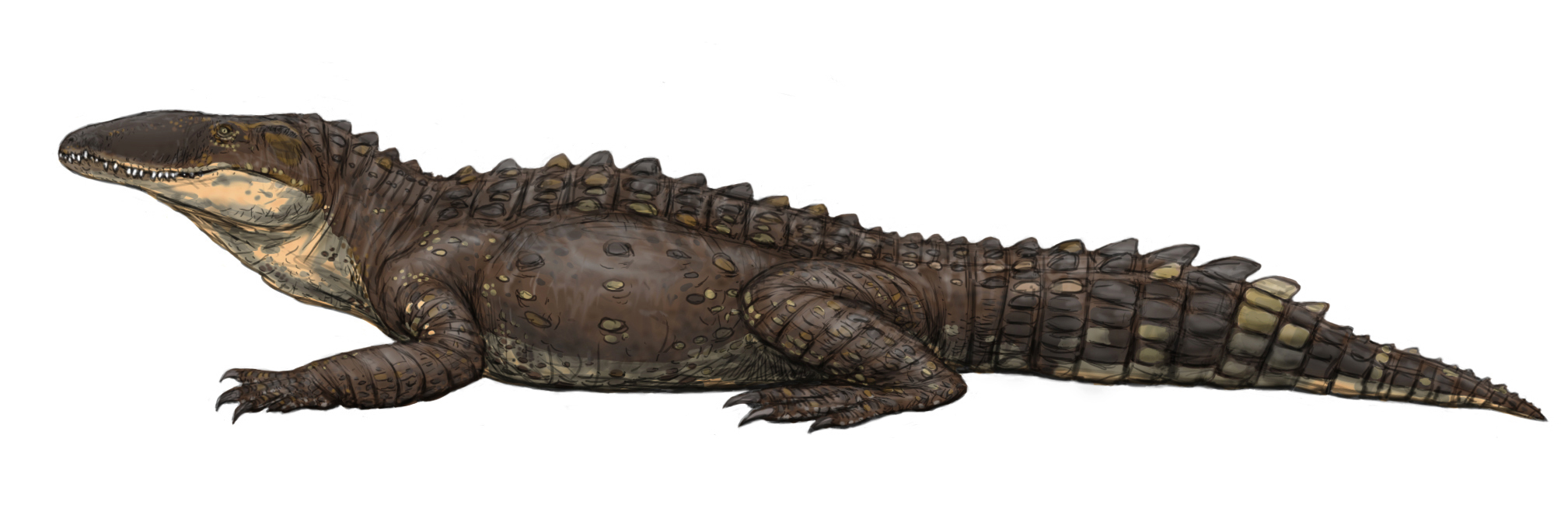
- Sebecus icaeorhinus

Scientific classification
- Kingdom: Animalia
- Phylum: Chordata
- Class: Reptilia
- Clade: Archosauria
- Clade: Pseudosuchia
- Clade: Crocodylomorpha
- Clade: Mesoeucrocodylia
- Informal group: †Mesosuchia; Huxley, 1875

Subgroups
- See text.

= Mesosuchia =

Mesosuchia Temporal range: 199–4.57 Ma Early Jurassic - Late Miocene/Early Pliocene

Obsolete name for a suborder of reptiles

"Mesosuchia" is an obsolete name for a group of terrestrial, semi-aquatic, or fully aquatic crocodylomorph reptiles.

== Characteristics ==
Mesosuchians differ from modern eusuchians by a shorter secondary palate, in which the choana is not surrounded by the medial pterygoid plate, and by the amphicoelom of the vertebrae. The secondary palate is formed by the premaxillary, maxillary and palatine bones. The inner nostrils are usually located between the palatine and pterygoid bones. The jaw bones sometimes join dorsally and push the nasal bones away from the premaxillary bones. The outer nostrils usually merge. The preorbital foramen is almost always lost. The superior temporal fossa is large, and the frontal bone reaches its edge. The postorbital arch is often located directly under the skin. The pubis does not enter the acetabulum. The carapace is usually well developed.

== History ==
The "Mesosuchia" were formerly placed at suborder rank as within Crocodylia. The "first" crocodiles were placed within their own suborder, Protosuchia; whilst extant species were placed within suborder Eusuchia (meaning 'true crocodiles'). Mesosuchia were the crocodylians "in between". But it is no longer regarded as genuine because it belongs to a paraphyletic group. It is replaced by its phylogenetic equivalent Mesoeucrocodylia, which contains the taxa herein, the Crocodylia, and some allied forms more recently discovered.

== Classification ==
- †Calsoyasuchus?
- †Dianchungosaurus
- †Hsisosuchus
- †Lusitanisuchus
- †Neuquensuchus
- †Thalattosuchia?
- †Shartegosuchoidea
  - †Shantungosuchus
  - †Sichuanosuchus
  - †Zosuchus
  - †Shartegosuchidae
- Metasuchia
  - †Notosuchia
  - Neosuchia (not including eusuchians)
    - †Burkesuchus
    - †Gilchristosuchus
    - †Isisfordia
    - †Karatausuchus
    - †Khoratosuchus
    - †Montsecosuchus
    - †Paluxysuchus
    - †Stolokrosuchus?
    - †Susisuchus
    - †Tadzhikosuchus
    - †Wahasuchus?
    - †Atoposauridae
    - †Bernissartiidae
    - †Goniopholididae
    - †Paralligatoridae
    - †Stomatosuchidae
    - †Tethysuchia
    - †Thalattosuchia?
    - †Wannchampsidae
