= Paluxysuchus =

Paluxysuchus Temporal range: Early Cretaceous, Aptian

Scientific classification
- Kingdom: Animalia
- Phylum: Chordata
- Class: Reptilia
- Clade: Pseudosuchia
- Clade: Crocodylomorpha
- Clade: Neosuchia
- Genus: †Paluxysuchus; Adams, 2013

Type species
- †Paluxysuchus newmani Adams, 2013

Extinct genus of reptiles

Paluxysuchus is an extinct genus of neosuchian crocodyliform known from the Early Cretaceous Twin Mountains Formation (late Aptian stage) of north-central Texas. It contains a single species, Paluxysuchus newmani. Paluxysuchus is one of three crocodyliforms known from the Early Cretaceous of Texas, the others being Pachycheilosuchus and an unnamed species referred to as the "Glen Rose Form". Paluxysuchus has a long, flat skull that is probably transitional between the long and narrow skulls of many early neosuchians and the short and flat skulls of later neosuchians.

== Description ==
The skull of Paluxysuchus is long, flat, and shaped somewhat like a triangle when viewed from above. In the most complete fossil of Paluxysuchus, the skull is about 30 centimetres (12 in) long. The teeth at the tip of the snout are enlarged. A ridge of bone behind the eye socket called the postorbital process has an elongated prong that borders the side of the socket. This feature is seen in only two other crocodyliforms (the giant crocodyliform Sarcosuchus and an unnamed goniopholidid) but probably evolved independently in Paluxysuchus.

== Discovery ==
Paluxysuchus is known from one mostly complete skull and jaws (the holotype specimen) and a fragment of the skull and jaws of a second individual. These remains were found within a fossil bonebed in a ranch in Hood County, Texas alongside a partial skeleton of the sauropod dinosaur Sauroposeidon. Paluxysuchus is named after the Paluxy River, which is known for the extensive trackways and isolated bones of dinosaurs that have been found along its banks in Dinosaur Valley State Park (the Sauroposeidon skeleton was initially given its own name, Paluxysaurus, in reference to the Paluxy River). The remains of Paluxysuchus come from the Twin Mountains Formation and are therefore slightly older than the footprints along the Paluxy River, which mostly come from the Glen Rose Formation. Paluxysuchus is the second crocodyliform to be named from the Early Cretaceous of Texas, the first being Pachycheilosuchus from the Glen Rose Formation. A third crocodyliform, the "Glen Rose Form", has also been identified, although it does not come from the Glen Rose Formation but the Antlers Formation (which is the same age, but located farther north). The type species of Paluxysuchus, P. newmani, was named after Kent Newman, who was involved in the excavation and preparation of many fossils from the Hood County ranch.

== Relationships ==
Paluxysuchus belongs to a clade called Neosuchia, which includes living crocodilians and their extinct relatives extending back to the Early Jurassic. Paluxysuchus is a basal member of Neosuchia, indicating that it was one of the earliest neosuchians to branch off from the group, although it is not the oldest neosuchian. When Paluxysuchus was named in 2013 it was incorporated into a phylogenetic analysis that assessed its relationship with other crocodyliforms. It was found to lie just outside "derived" neosuchians, which include all modern crocodilians and more basal forms characterized by shortened or brevirostrine snouts. Paluxysuchus has a lengthened or longirostrine snout, which is considered a primitive condition among neosuchians. However, while most other primitively longirostrine neosuchians have tubular snouts, Paluxysuchus has a flattened or platyrostral snout. Derived neosuchians, although brevirostrine, also have flattened snouts, indicating that Paluxysuchus may represent an evolutionary transition toward shorter, flatter skulls within Neosuchia.

The 2013 analysis found Pachycheilosuchus to be a close relative, slightly more basal within Neosuchia than Paluxysuchus. Other phylogenetic analyses place Pachycheilosuchus in the family Hylaeochampsidae, a more derived position within Neosuchia that is closer to Crocodylia, the group containing modern crocodilians. This makes it one of the earliest members of the clade Eusuchia. The 2013 analysis found the Glen Rose Form in a more derived position than Paluxysuchus, but outside Eusuchia. Below is a cladogram modified from the analysis:

- Crocodyliformes
  - - Orthosuchus
    - - - Hemiprotosuchus
        - Protosuchus
      - - Edentosuchus
        - Kayenta Form
  - - Gobiosuchidae
    - - - Zosuchus
        - - Shantungosuchus
          - Sichuanosuchus
      - Mesoeucrocodylia
        - Hsisosuchus
        - - Fruitachampsa
          - - Notosuchia
            - Neosuchia
              - Stolokrosuchus
              - - Atoposauridae
                - - - Thalattosuchia
                    - Tethysuchia
                  - - Pachycheilosuchus
                    - - Paluxysuchus newmani
                      - - - Goniopholididae
                          - - Bernissartia
                            - - - Rugosuchus
                                - - Shamosuchus
                                  - - Glen Rose Form
                                    - Proctor Lake taxon
                              - Eusuchia
                                - - Hylaeochampsa
                                  - Pristichampsus
                                - - Allodaposuchus
                                  - - - Borealosuchus
                                      - Leidyosuchus
                                    - Crocodylia
