= Javkhlant Formation =

Geological formation in Dornogovi, Mongolia

- Stratigraphic range: Santonian-Campanian; ~85 Ma
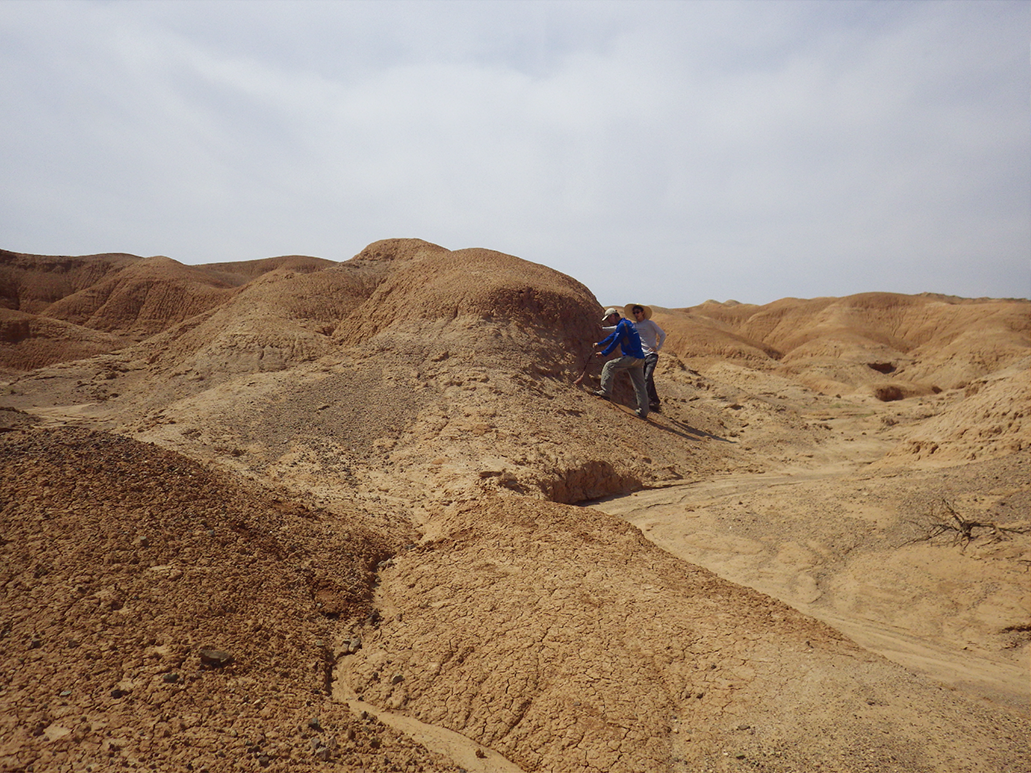
- Khugenetjavkhlant locality
- Type: Geological formation
- Overlies: Bayan Shireh Formation
- Thickness: 380 m (1,250 ft)

Lithology
- Primary: Mudstone
- Other: Sandstone, conglomerate

Location
- Coordinates: 44.4°N 109.4°E
- Approximate paleocoordinates: 44.6°N 98.8°E
- Region: Dornogov
- Country: Mongolia

Type section
- Named by: Khand et al.
- Year defined: 2000
- Javkhlant Formation (Mongolia)

The Javkhlant Formation is a geological formation in Mongolia whose strata date back to the Late Cretaceous possibly Santonian to Campanian. Ceratopsian, ornithopod and theropod remains been found in the formation. A prominent fossilized therizinosauroid nesting site is also known from the formation.

== Paleobiota of the Javkhlant Formation ==
Color key: Taxon / Reclassified taxon / Taxon falsely reported as present / Dubious taxon or junior synonym / Ichnotaxon / Ootaxon / Morphotaxon	Notes; Uncertain or tentative taxa are in small text; ~~crossed out~~ taxa are discredited.

=== Reptiles ===
Genus	Species	Location	Stratigraphic Position	Material	Notes	Images
Albinykus	A. baatar	Khugenetjavkhlant		"Partial hindlimbs and pelvic girdle."	An alvarezsaurid.	
Dendroolithidae indet.	Indeterminate	Khugenetjavkhlant		"Large nesting site composed by more than 10 egg clutches in several nests."	A nesting area laid by a colony of therizinosauroids.	
Enantiornithes indet.	Indeterminate	Khugenetjavkhlant		"Embryonic remains enclosed within an isolated egg."	Bird eggs. Previously misidentified as neoceratopsian eggs.	
Haya	H. griva	Khugenetjavkhlant, Zos Canyon		"Skull with partial skeletons of multiple specimens."	A thescelosaurid.	
Ornithomimidae indet.	Indeterminate	Khugenetjavkhlant		Not specified.	An ornithomimid.	
Yamaceratops	Y. dorngobiensis	Khugenetjavkhlant, Shine Us Khuduk	Shine Us Khuduk red beds	"Skull with partial skeletons, including juveniles."	A neoceratopsian.	
Zaraasuchus	Z. shepardi	Zos Canyon		"Skull and fragmentary skeleton."	A gobiosuchid.	
Zosuchus	Z. davidsoni	Zos Canyon		"Skull."	A shartegosuchoid.	

== See also ==
- List of dinosaur-bearing rock formations
