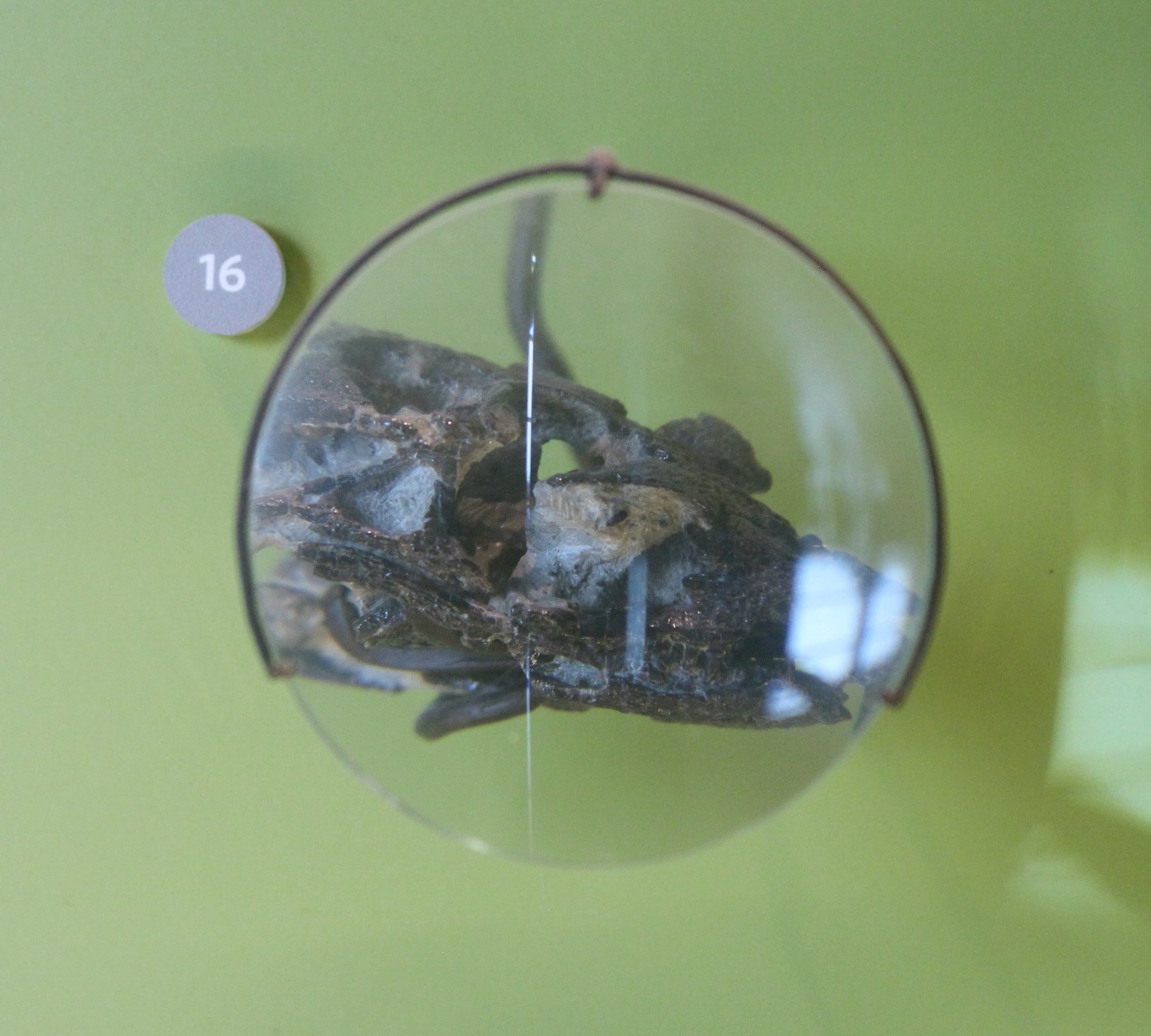
- Holotype skull (LACM 120455a), Natural History Museum of Los Angeles County

Scientific classification
- Domain: Eukaryota
- Kingdom: Animalia
- Phylum: Chordata
- Class: Reptilia
- Clade: Archosauria
- Clade: Pseudosuchia
- Clade: Crocodylomorpha
- Clade: Crocodyliformes
- Family: †Shartegosuchidae
- Genus: †Fruitachampsa; Clark, 2011

Type species
- †Fruitachampsa callisoni Clark, 2011

= Fruitachampsa =

Fruitachampsa Temporal range: Late Jurassic, 149 Ma

Extinct genus of reptiles

Fruitachampsa is a genus of shartegosuchid crocodyliform from the Upper Jurassic Morrison Formation of Colorado. It is known from multiple specimens that show it to have been a relatively long-limbed terrestrial quadrupedal predator less than 1 metre (3.3 ft) long, with a short face and a prominent pair of canine-like teeth in the lower jaw. Before it was formally described in 2011, it was also known as the "Fruita form". Its type species is F. callisoni.

== Discovery ==
Fossils of Fruitachampsa have been found from the Fruita Paleontological Area (FPA) in Fruita, Colorado. The deposits in the FPA belong to the Morrison Formation, which is Late Jurassic in age. The first remains of Fruitachampsa were found by paleontologists James Clark and George Callison in 1975, who discovered a diverse assemblage of microvertebrates at the FPA. More complete material of Fruitachampsa was found in 1976, 1977, and 1979. Fruitachampsa has been found alongside another more basal crocodylomorph, Macelognathus.

The name Fruitachampsa has existed since the late 1980s. Because the name was not published with a formal description, Fruitachampsa was considered a nomen nudum or "naked name." Fruitachampsa callisoni was formally described by James Clark in 2011, with the specific name honoring George Callison.

== Description ==
Most of the body of Fruitachampsa is known from several partial skeletons and skulls. It is a small crocodyliform under 1 metre (3.3 ft) in length. Although small, Fruitachampsa is large in comparison to other shartegosuchids, with a maximum skull length of 9 centimetres (3.5 in). Viewed from above, the skull is square-shaped in the back and narrows toward the snout. The snout is similar in appearance to that of the living caiman genus Paleosuchus, although it is not flattened like in modern crocodylians. As in other early crocodylomorphs, a bone called the palpebral extends backwards over the eye socket like an eyebrow. The teeth at the back of the jaws have flattened tops with ridges running along their length. Unlike other crocodyliforms, Fruitachampsa lacks mandibular or antorbital fenestrae (holes in the lower jaw and in front of the eye sockets). Fruitachampsa differs from other shartegosuchids in that it has procoelous vertebrae with concave anterior surfaces and convex posterior surfaces.

As a terrestrial crocodyliform, Fruitachampsa has long and extremely slender limbs. Bony plates called osteoderms cover the back in two overlapping rows, and are much thinner than those of living crocodylians. Most specimens of Fruitachampsa probably belong to adult individuals because the neural arch is fused to the body of each vertebra, and the sacral ribs are fused to the sacrum. For most living crocodylians, young individuals have many unfused elements in their vertebral column. Other features such as a deeply pitted skull roof and the fusing of the frontal bones in some individuals also suggest that the known material of Fruitachampsa represent mature individuals. Therefore, it is unlikely that Fruitachampsa grew much larger in body size than the specimens indicate.

== Classification ==
Before it was formally described, Fruitachampsa was included in several phylogenetic analyses as the "Fruita form". These analyses usually placed it as a basal member of a group called Mesoeucrocodylia. When it was named in 2011, a phylogenetic analysis of Fruitachampsa grouped it with a family of Asian crocodyliforms called Shartegosuchidae. Shartegosuchids lie outside Mesoeucrocodylia in a more basal position among Crocodyliformes. These non-mesoueucrocodylian crocodyliforms are often called protosuchians, although Protosuchia is rarely considered a monophyletic grouping. Fruitachampsa was probably placed among more advanced crocodyliforms in earlier analyses because these studies did not include the poorly known Asian shartegosuchids.

Fruitachampsa possesses several features in common with more advanced crocodyliforms, including procoelous vertebrae and a secondary palate. These features are highly variable in crocodyliforms, and probably evolved independently in Fruitachampsa. Below is a cladogram showing the phylogenetic placement of Fruitachampsa from Clark (2011):

- Crocodyliformes
  - Protosuchidae
  - - - Gobiosuchus
      - Zaraasuchus
    - - Zosuchus
      - Sichuanosuchus
      - Shantungosuchus
      - - Nominosuchus
        - - Fruitachampsa
          - - Shartegosuchus
            - Adzhosuchus
      - - Hsisosuchus
        - Mesoeucrocodylia

== Paleobiology ==
Fruitachampsa is the only shartegosuchid known from North America, and is one of the youngest members of the group. The presence of Fruitachampsa in the western United States suggests that shartegosuchids radiated from Asia into North America. During the Late Jurassic, the only route between Asia and North America would have been through Europe. Although shartegosuchids likely inhabited Europe, no fossils have been found from the continent.
