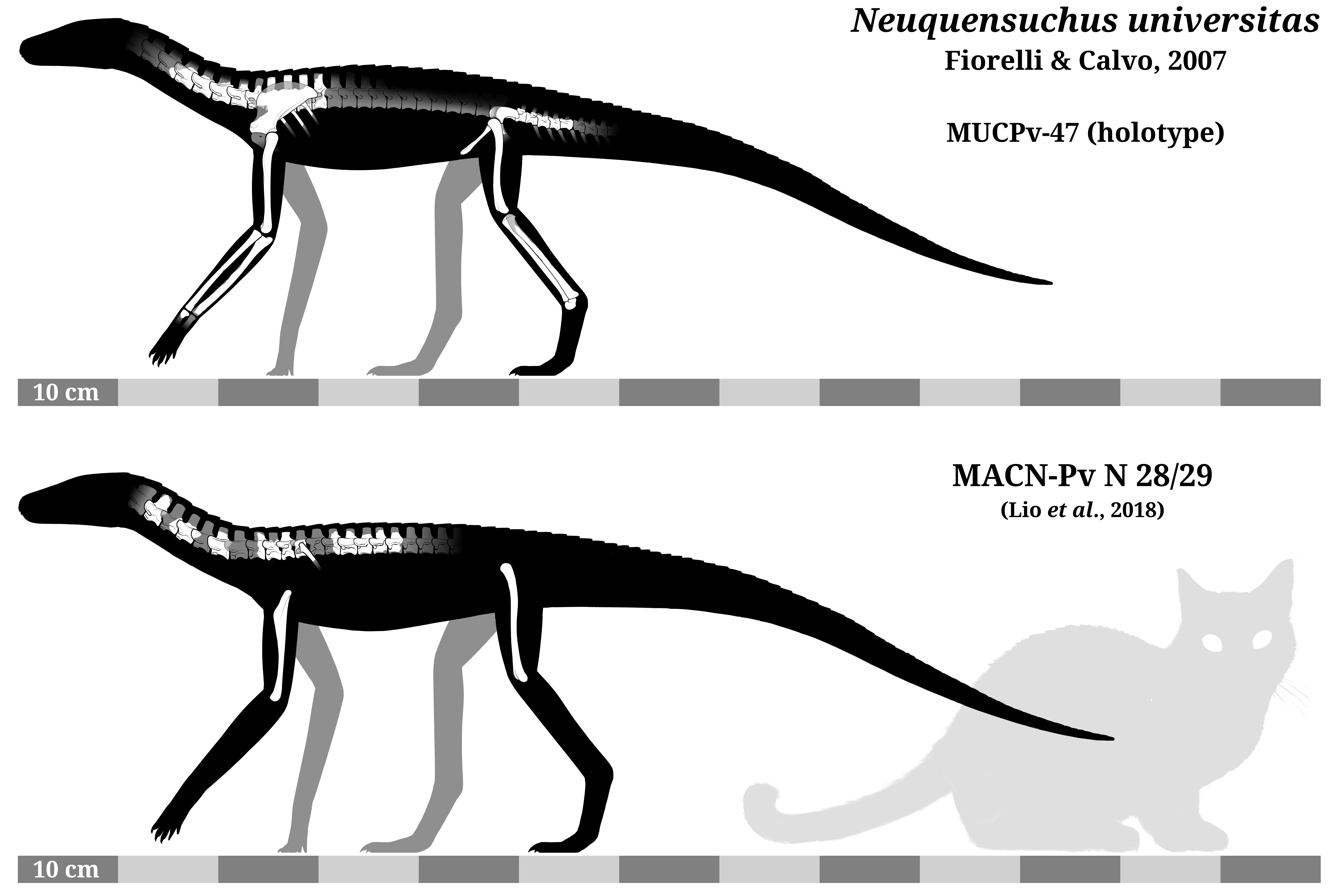
- Skeletal reconstruction of the holotype and referred specimens

Scientific classification
- Kingdom: Animalia
- Phylum: Chordata
- Class: Reptilia
- Clade: Pseudosuchia
- Clade: Crocodylomorpha
- Clade: Solidocrania
- Clade: Crocodyliformes
- Clade: Mesoeucrocodylia
- Genus: †Neuquensuchus; Fiorelli & Calvo, 2007

Type species
- Neuquensuchus universitas Fiorelli & Calvo, 2007

= Neuquensuchus =

Neuquensuchus Temporal range: Late Cretaceous, 85 Ma

Extinct genus of reptiles

Neuquensuchus (meaning "Neuquén crocodile", referring to the city) is an extinct genus of crocodyliform from the Santonian-age Upper Cretaceous Bajo de la Carpa Formation of Neuquén Province, Argentina. The known remains were discovered on the campus of Universidad Nacional del Comahue in the city of Neuquén. Neuquensuchus was named by Lucas E. Fiorelli and Jorge O. Calvo in a publication dated to 2007, but which became available in 2008. The type species is N. universitas, in recognition of its discovery locality. Unlike the great majority of crocodyliforms, its shin was longer than its thigh, suggesting it had some running ability.

== Description ==
Neuquensuchus is based on MUCPv-47, a partially articulated partial postcranial skeleton composed of six neck, four back, two hip, and five tail vertebrae; ribs; partial right shoulder blade and arm; left shoulder blade and upper arm; a partial pelvis; and most of the right leg above the foot. Another specimen, MUCPv-161, composed of some left leg bones, was also assigned to the new genus.

It had a relatively long and slender neck. The limb bones were also slender. It was not a large animal; the upper arm bones of the type specimen measure about 10.0 centimeters (about 3.9 in) long, the thigh bone about 9.4 centimeters (about 3.7 in) long, and the shin bone about 10.5 centimeters (about 4.1 in) long. Unlike all known crocodyliforms with measurable leg bones except Shantungosuchus, the shin was longer than the femur.

Fiorelli and Calvo ran a phylogenetic analysis of their new genus and found it to be allied with Shantungosuchus, Sichuanosuchus, Zosuchus, and Fruitachampsa. This phylogeny complicated the paleobiogeographical history basal non-neosuchian crocodyliforms more derived than Protosuchia because Neuquensuchus is endemic to South America and other putative allied genera are older and from Laurasia. While several subsequent cladistic analyses recovered Neuquensuchus as a member of the notosuchian clade Ziphosuchia, a position which is more consistent with the fossil record and paleobiogeography of non-neosuchian mesoeucrocodylians, the original position was upheld by an analysis conducted by Gabriel Liu and colleagues in 2017.

== Paleobiology and paleoecology ==
Neuquensuchus shared its environment with a variety of animals, including snakes (Dinilysia), other crocodyliforms (Comahuesuchus, Cynodontosuchus, Notosuchus, and an unnamed form), and a variety of dinosaurs including abelisaurids, noasaurid (Velocisaurus), and alvarezsaurid (Alvarezsaurus) theropods, titanosaurians including Bonitasaura, and birds (Neuquenornis and Patagopteryx). Neuquensuchus, a small, slender crocodyliform, had limb proportions well-suited to running, and was probably a swift, land-living animal.

== See also ==
- List of crurotarsans
- Sichuanosuchus
- Zosuchus
- Tzaganosuchus
