= Cassissuchus =

Cassissuchus Temporal range: Early Cretaceous, 129.4–126.3 Ma

Scientific classification
- Kingdom: Animalia
- Phylum: Chordata
- Class: Reptilia
- Clade: Archosauria
- Clade: Pseudosuchia
- Clade: Crocodylomorpha
- Family: †Gobiosuchidae
- Genus: †Cassissuchus; Buscalioni, 2017
- Species: †C. sanziuami

Binomial name
- †Cassissuchus sanziuami Buscalioni, 2017

Extinct genus of crocodyliform

Cassissuchus is an extinct genus of gobiosuchid crocodyliform known from the Early Cretaceous Calizas de La Huérgina Formation in Spain. It contains a single species, Cassissuchus sanziuami.
