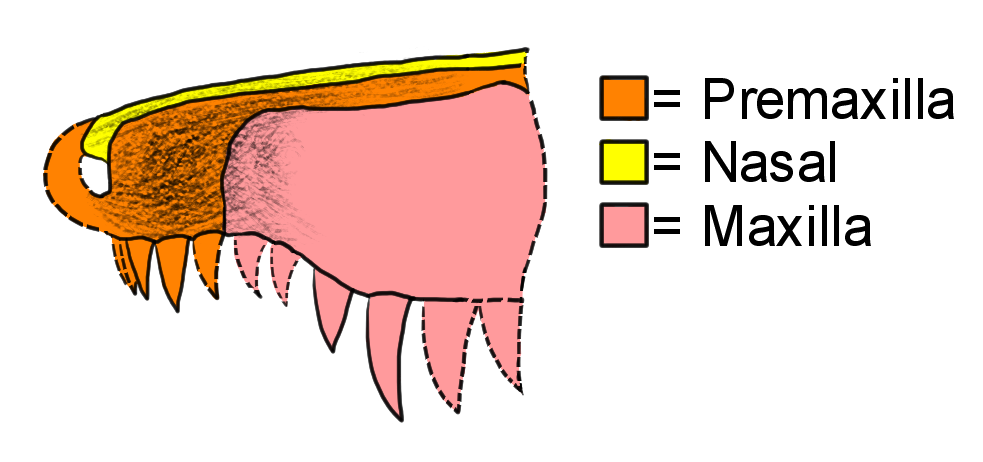
- Diagram of preserved snout bones
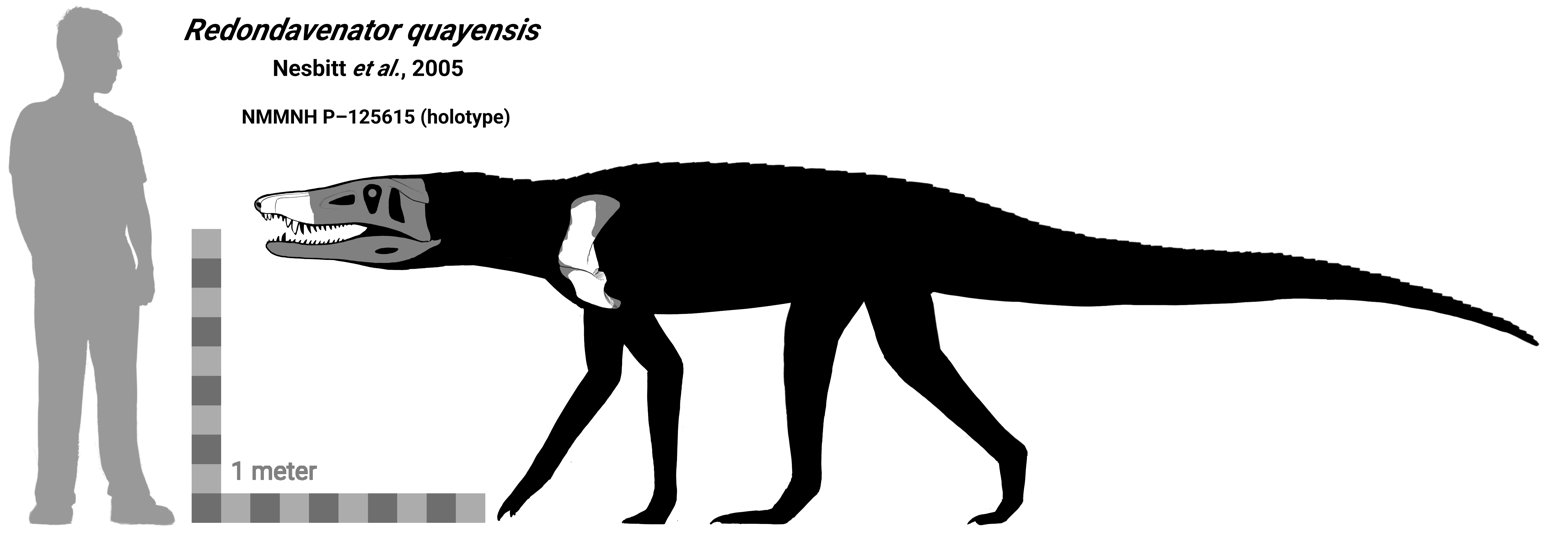
- Size comparison of Redondavenator, showcasing known bones in white

Scientific classification
- Kingdom: Animalia
- Phylum: Chordata
- Class: Reptilia
- Clade: Pseudosuchia
- Clade: Crocodylomorpha
- Genus: †Redondavenator; Nesbitt et al., 2005

Type species
- †Redondavenator quayensis Nesbitt et al., 2005

= Redondavenator =

Redondavenator Temporal range: Late Triassic, 200 Ma

Extinct genus of reptiles

Redondavenator (meaning "Redonda Formation hunter") is a genus of sphenosuchian, a type of basal crocodylomorph, the clade that comprises the crocodilians and their closest kin. It is known from a partial upper jaw and left shoulder girdle found in rocks of the Norian-Rhaetian-age Upper Triassic Redonda Formation, northeastern New Mexico. It is notable for its large size; the minimum estimated skull length for the holotype individual is 60 centimetres (2.0 ft). This makes it the largest Triassic crocodylomorph ever recorded.

== History and description ==
Redondavenator is based on NMMNH P–125615, a partial anterior skull and associated partial left scapula and coracoid. These fossils were collected during one of the New Mexico Museum of Natural History and Science expeditions to the Redonda Formation of Quay County, New Mexico in the 1980s and 1990s. A partial lower jaw was once thought to belong as well, but was found to have come from a phytosaur. The fossils were found in a conglomerate layer high in the formation, above lacustrine shales with fossils of semionotid fish. The conglomerate is interpreted as debris flows along a lake margin.

Redondavenator was named in 2005 by Sterling Nesbitt and colleagues. The type species is R. quayensis, referring to Quay County. The preserved portion of the skull includes the premaxillae (snout tip) and parts of the maxillae (main tooth-bearing bones of the upper jaw) and nasals, in front of the antorbital fenestra. The fourth and fifth teeth of the maxilla were enlarged. Ridges and other sculpting were present on the upper surface of the snout. The shoulder bones were robust. Nesbitt and colleagues described their new genus as a basal sphenosuchian. They interpreted it as filling a large terrestrial predator role that had been left empty by the extinction of "rauisuchians".
