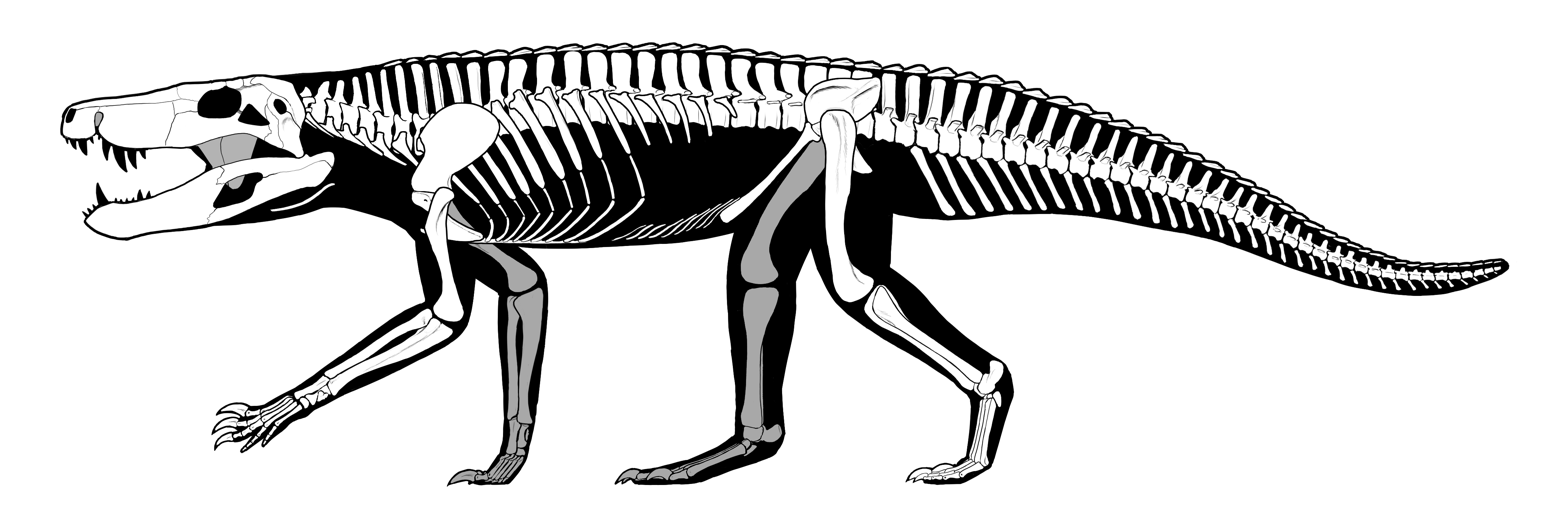
- Skeleton of Baurusuchus (Notosuchia)

Scientific classification
- Kingdom: Animalia
- Phylum: Chordata
- Class: Reptilia
- Clade: Archosauria
- Clade: Pseudosuchia
- Clade: Crocodylomorpha
- Clade: Solidocrania
- Clade: Crocodyliformes
- Clade: Mesoeucrocodylia; Whetstone and Whybrow, 1983

Subgroups
- †Calsoyasuchus?; †Dianchungosaurus; †Hsisosuchus; †Lusitanisuchus; †Neuquensuchus; †Gobiosuchidae?; †Thalattosuchia?; †Shartegosuchoidea; †Shantungosuchus; †Sichuanosuchus; †Zosuchus; †Shartegosuchidae; Metasuchia; †Notosuchia; Neosuchia

= Mesoeucrocodylia =

Mesoeucrocodylia Temporal range: Sinemurian - Recent, 199–0 Ma

Clade of reptiles

Mesoeucrocodylia is the clade that includes Eusuchia and crocodyliforms formerly placed in the paraphyletic group Mesosuchia. The group appeared during the Early Jurassic, and continues to the present day.

== Diagnosis ==
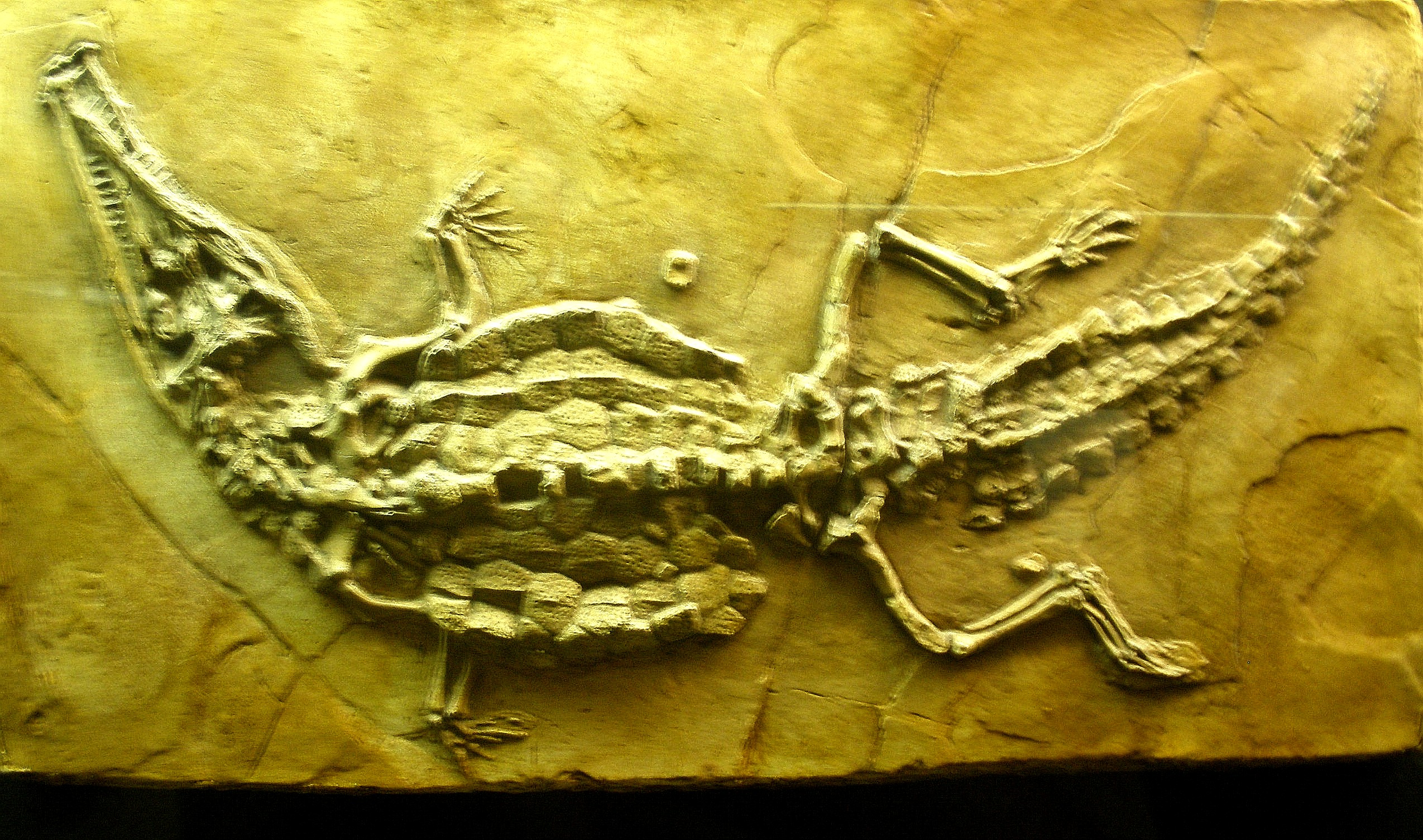
Crocodilaemus robustus

It was long known that Mesosuchia was an evolutionary grade, a hypothesis confirmed by the phylogenetic analysis of Benton and Clark (1988) which demonstrated that Eusuchia (which includes all living crocodylian species) was nested within Mesosuchia. Due to the paraphyly of Mesosuchia, Mesoeucrocodylia was erected to replace Mesosuchia.

Several anatomical characteristics differentiate Mesoeucrocodylia from the other crocodylomorph clades. The frontal bones of the skull are fused together into a single compound element, for example. Mesoeucrocodylians possess something of a secondary palate, formed by the posterior extension of sutured palatine bones. The otic aperture of the members of this clade is blocked posteriorly by the squamosal bone.

== Classification ==
=== Phylogeny ===
Below is a cladogram from Fiorelli and Calvo (2007).

- Mesoeucrocodylia
  - - Fruitachampsa
    - - Zosuchus
      - - Sichuanosuchus
        - - Shantungosuchus
          - Neuquensuchus
  - - Hsisosuchus
    - Metasuchia
      - Neosuchia (includes Eusuchia)
      - Peirosauridae
      - Notosuchia
