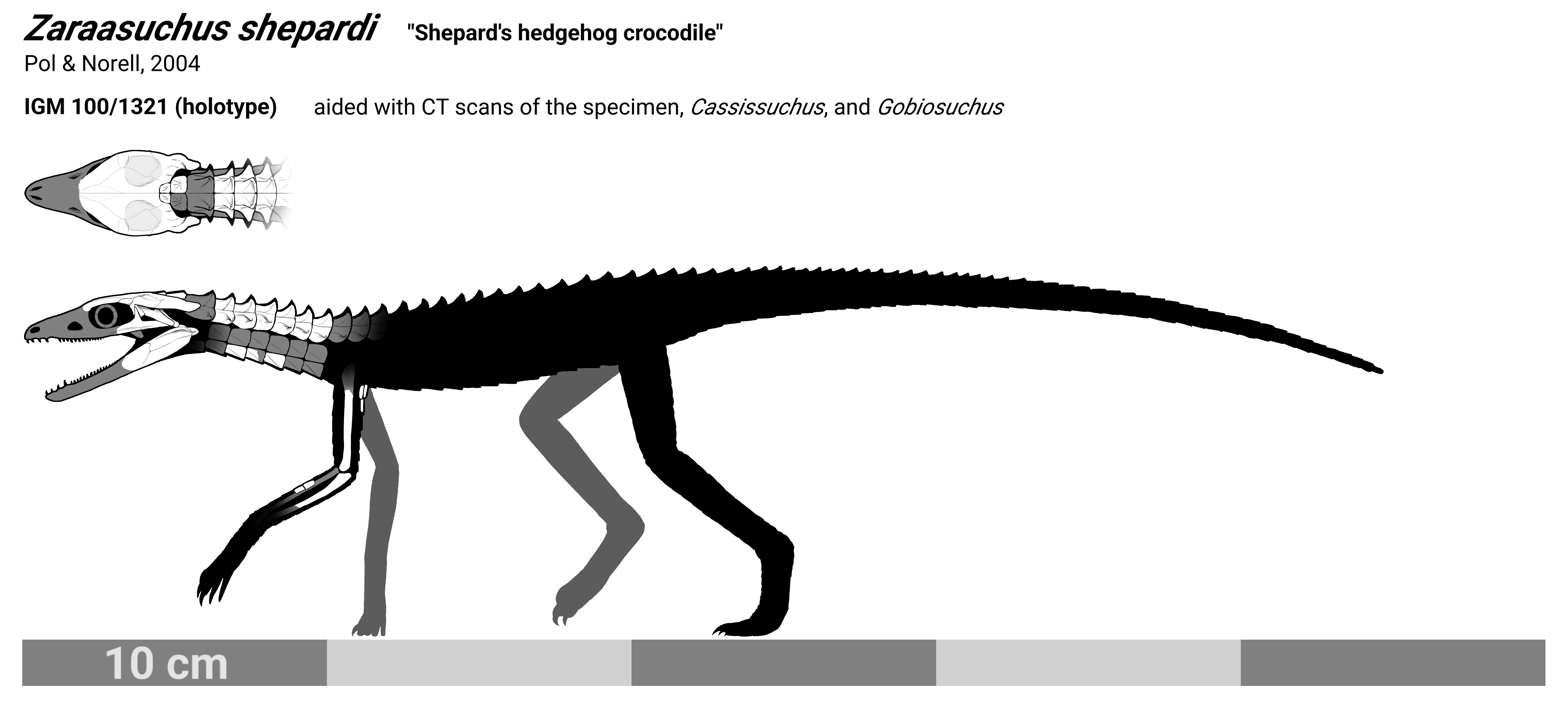
- Skeletal reconstruction of the known remains

Scientific classification
- Kingdom: Animalia
- Phylum: Chordata
- Class: Reptilia
- Clade: Pseudosuchia
- Clade: Crocodylomorpha
- Family: †Gobiosuchidae
- Genus: †Zaraasuchus; Pol & Norell, 2004

Type species
- †Zaraasuchus shepardi Pol & Norell, 2004

= Zaraasuchus =

Zaraasuchus Temporal range: Late Cretaceous

Extinct genus of reptiles

Zaraasuchus ("hedgehog crocodile") is a gobiosuchid crocodyliform described in 2004 by Diego Pol and Mark Norell. It was found in the Red Beds of Zos Canyon, in the Gobi Desert of Mongolia, thus making it Late Cretaceous in age.

The type species is Z. shepardi, honouring Dr. Richard Shepard.

== Description ==
The holotype of Z. shepardi is IGM 100/1321, consisting of the posterior region of the skull and lower jaws in articulation with cervical vertebrae, forelimb elements and osteoderms.

The skull was relatively wide, with the upper temporal fenestrae of the skull being completely closed off by the surrounding squamosal and parietal bones (characteristic of gobiosuchids).

It possessed highly developed osteoderms, with 4 rows of dorsal osteoderms laterally sutured to each other, each one with a sharp, pronounced spike and several rugose ridges. The cervical ventral osteoderms were disarticulated, but these were likely sutured laterally with the dorsal osteoderms to complete a concentric "ring" of armor around the neck, presumably the torso, and tail (as seen in Gobiosuchus).

The holotype preserves an incomplete forelimb, these were long and gracile.

== Systematics ==
Pol and Norell (2004) found Zaraasuchus shepardi to be the sister taxon of Gobiosuchus kielanae, united by 14 synapomorphies, primarily from the skull, forming the family Gobiosuchidae.

== Sources ==
- Pol, D. & Norell, M. A., (2004). "A new gobiosuchid crocodyliform taxon from the Cretaceous of Mongolia". American Museum Novitates 3458: 1-31.
