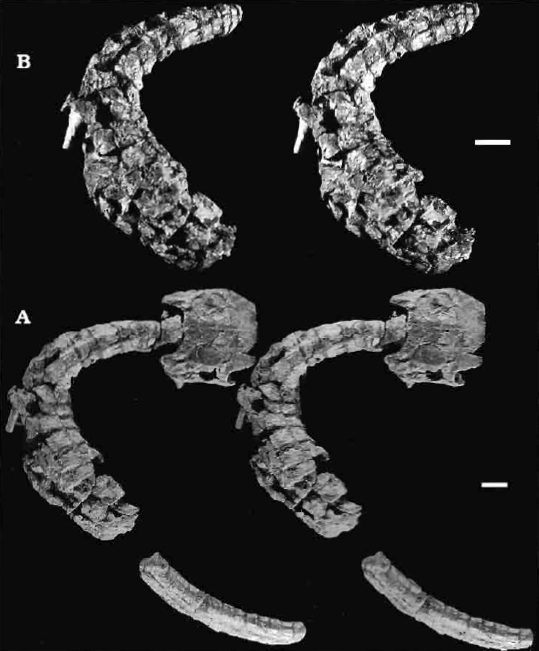
- Specimen encased in armour
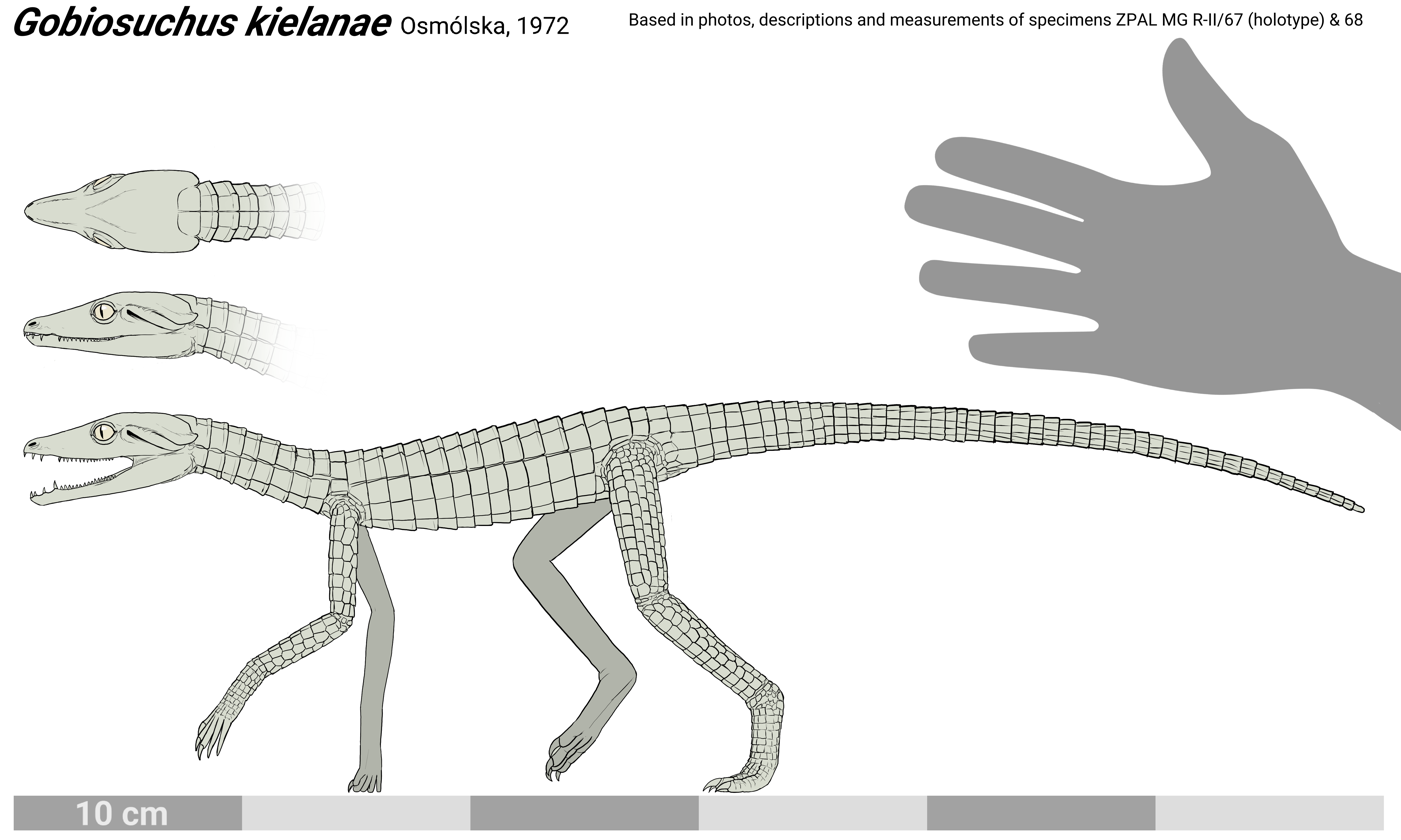
- Life restoration and size comparison

Scientific classification
- Kingdom: Animalia
- Phylum: Chordata
- Class: Reptilia
- Clade: Archosauria
- Clade: Pseudosuchia
- Clade: Crocodylomorpha
- Family: †Gobiosuchidae
- Genus: †Gobiosuchus; Osmólska, 1972
- Species: †G. kielanae

Binomial name
- †Gobiosuchus kielanae Osmólska, 1972

= Gobiosuchus =

Gobiosuchus Temporal range: Late Cretaceous, Campanian

Extinct genus of crocodyliform

Gobiosuchus ("Gobi [desert] crocodile") is an extinct genus of crocodyliform described in 1972 by Polish palaeontologist Halszka Osmólska. It hails from the Late Cretaceous (Early Campanian) of Bayn Dzak (Djadokhta Formation), in the Gobi Desert of Mongolia. The type species is Gobiosuchus kielanae, classified as a member of the family Gobiosuchidae.

== Description ==
Gobiosuchus is a small and gracile animal with long, slender limbs (despite the comparatively small pectoral and pelvic girdles) and a relatively elongated neck. It is very heavily armoured, with several transverse rows of dorsal and ventral osteoderms that correspond to each vertebra and meet laterally, forming overlapping cylindrical "rings" of dermal scutes surrounding the entirety of the neck (8 transverse rows), torso (10 transverse rows), and tail. It also has osteoderms on the limbs arranged in a mosaic pattern. The cervical and thoracic scutes have a thickened ridge on their posterior end, where they overlapped the next ring behind it, limiting flexibility despite the elongated proportions.

The skull is relatively short and tall, with large orbits and laterally projecting squamosal bones of the skull roof. The palate possesses several pits to receive the sharp, conical teeth of the lower jaw, with the biggest of these corresponding to the enlarged fourth dentary tooth.

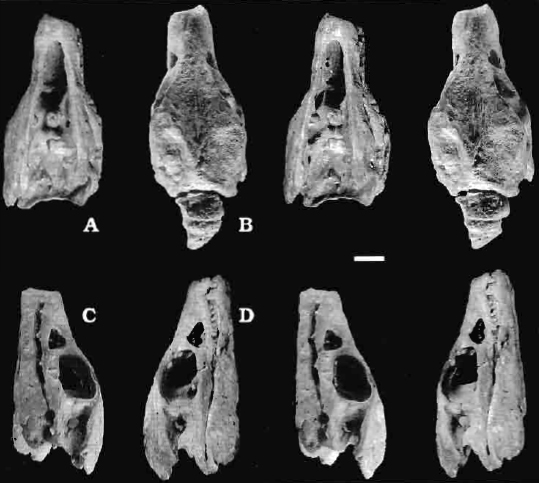
Skull in multiple views
