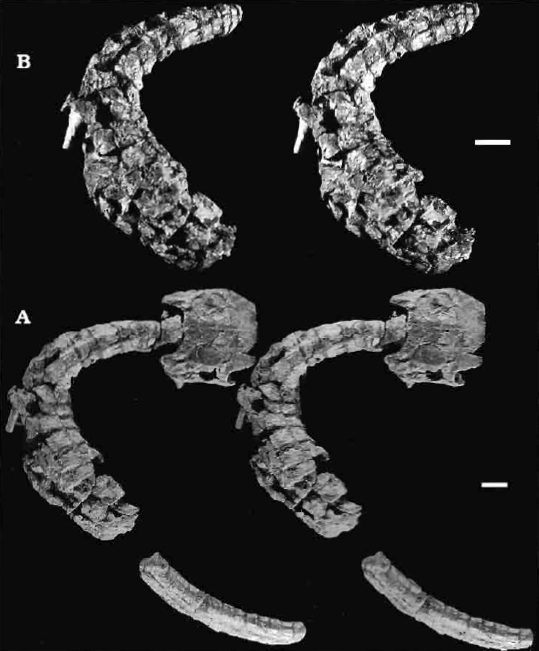
- A specimen of Gobiosuchus encased in armor
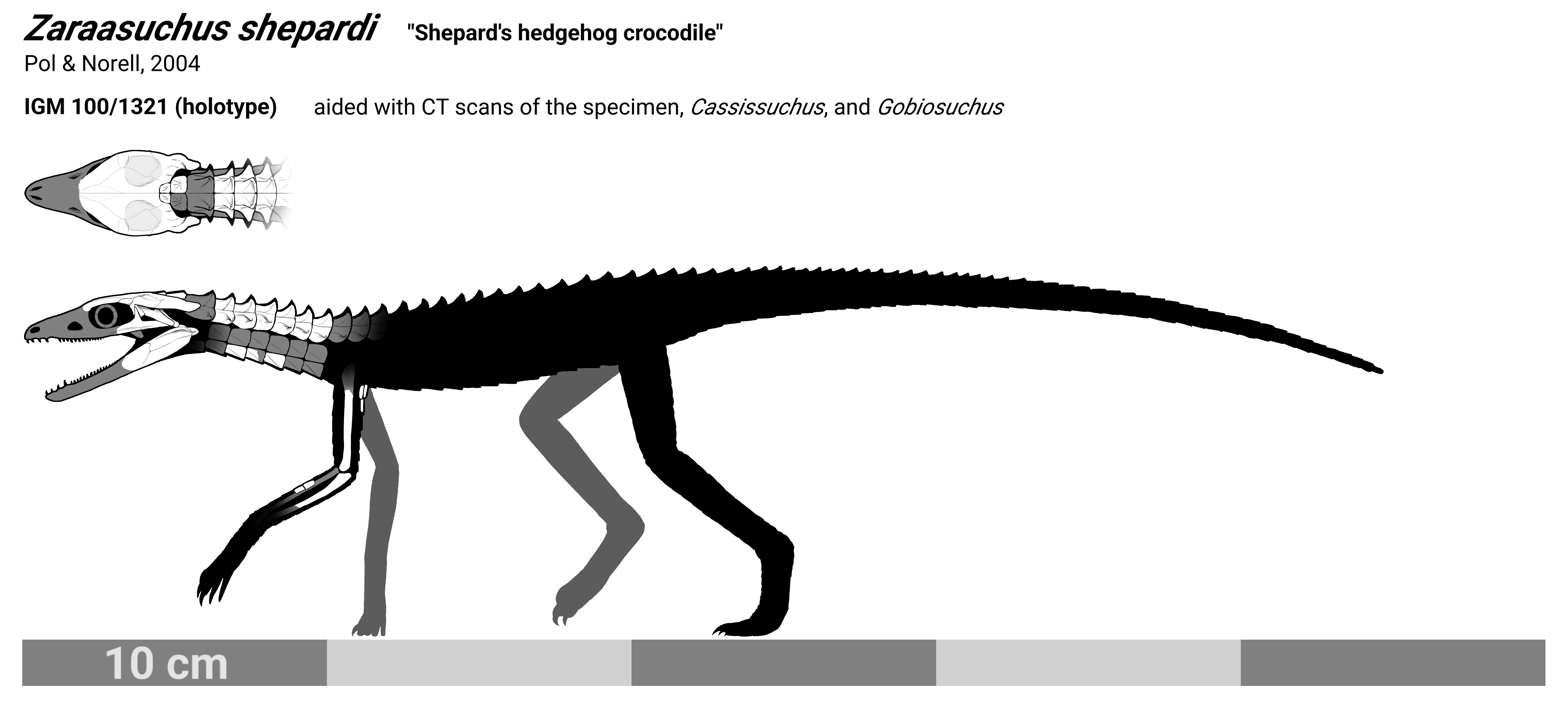
- Skeletal diagram of Zaraasuchus

Scientific classification
- Kingdom: Animalia
- Phylum: Chordata
- Class: Reptilia
- Clade: Pseudosuchia
- Clade: Crocodylomorpha
- Superfamily: †Gobiosuchoidea
- Family: †Gobiosuchidae; Osmólska, 1972

Genera
- †Cassissuchus; †Gobiosuchus; †Zaraasuchus

= Gobiosuchidae =

Gobiosuchidae Temporal range: Late Barremian - Late Campanian 129.4–71 Ma

Family of reptiles

Gobiosuchidae is a family of Cretaceous crocodyliforms known from Mongolia and Spain.

== Genera ==
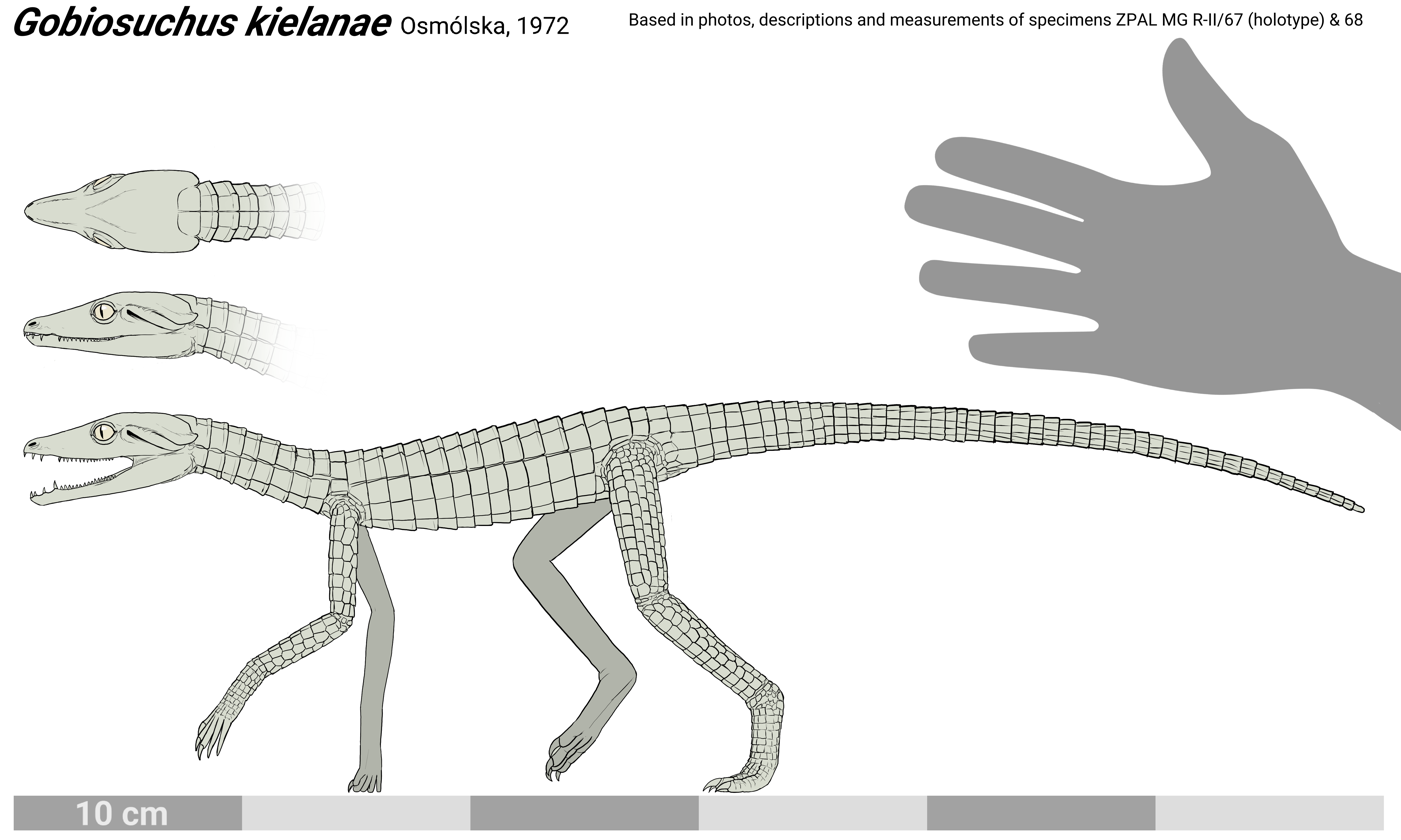
Illustration of Gobiosuchus

Three genera are currently classified within Gobiosuchidae: Cassissuchus, Gobiosuchus, and Zaraasuchus.

== Synapomorphies ==
According to Pol & Norell (2004), gobiosuchids form a clade united by the following synapomorphies:

- Parietal without broad occipital portion
- Absence of external mandibular fenestra
- More than two parallel rows of dorsal osteoderms
- Cranial table as wide as ventral portion of skull
- Palpebrals sutured to each other and the frontal, excluding it from the orbital margin
- External surface of ascending process of jugal exposed posterolaterally
- Longitudinal ridge on lateral surface of jugal below infratemporal fenestra
- Dorsal surface of posterolateral process of squamosal ornamented with three longitudinal ridges
- Presence of a sharp ridge along ventral surface of angular
- Surangular with a longitudinal ridge on its dorsolateral surface
- Dorsal surface of osteoderms ornamented with anterolaterally and anteromedially directed ridges
- Cervical region surrounded by lateral and ventral osteoderms sutured to the dorsal elements
- Presence of appendicular osteoderms
- Closed, or incipiently close, supratemporal fenestra

== Sources ==
- Pol, D. & Norell, M. A., (2004). "A new gobiosuchid crocodyliform taxon from the Cretaceous of Mongolia". American Museum Novitates 3458: 1-31.
