= Shantungosuchus =

Shantungosuchus Temporal range: 129–110 Ma Early Cretaceous

Scientific classification
- Kingdom: Animalia
- Phylum: Chordata
- Class: Reptilia
- Clade: Archosauria
- Clade: Pseudosuchia
- Clade: Crocodylomorpha
- Clade: Mesoeucrocodylia
- Clade: †Shartegosuchoidea
- Genus: †Shantungosuchus; Yang, 1961

Species
- †S. chuhsienensis Young, 1961 (type); †S. hangjinensis Wu et al, 1994; †S. brachycephalus Young, 1982

Extinct genus of reptiles

Shantungosuchus is an extinct genus of Early Cretaceous crocodyliform found in China. It includes three species: Shantungosuchus chuhsienensis and S. brachycephalus, which were both described by Yang Zhongjian – usually referred to as "Young" – in 1961 and 1982, and S. hangjinensis, which was described by Xiao-Chun Wu et al in 1994. S. chuhsienensis is the type for this genus.

== Etymology ==
The primary part of Shantungosuchus' name comes from Shan-tung, the Wade-Giles romanization of Shandong (simplified Chinese: 山东; traditional Chinese: 山東; pinyin: Shāndōng; Wade–Giles: Shan^{1}tung^{1}), a province located on the eastern coast of the People's Republic of China, where it was first discovered. The second part, suchus is an Ancient Greek word referring to the Egyptian crocodile deity Sobek that is commonly used as a suffix for crocodylomorph genera and crocodile-like animals in general.

== Description ==
Shantungosuchus chuhsienenis was first described from an articulated skeleton that was preserved as an impression of its ventral surface. Its small size, slender body, and triangular skull made it distinct from other atoposaurids. Its total length is only about 30 cm (12 in).

Shantungosuchus belongs to Protosuchia, a group of early crocodilian relatives that were all rather small in size, about 1 meter in length, and terrestrial rather than aquatic. They are most easily distinguished from other crocodylians by their short premaxilla and maxillas, a transversely broad shelf on the jugal bone, and a pair of posterolaterally divergent ridges on the pterygoid, and two large depressions on the sphenoid bone. The angular shape of the rest of the skull is absent from the posterolateral section of the jaw. The dentaries near the symphysis are superficially asymmetrical. All known forms of Shantungosuchus also have a square-shaped fossa on the jugal, and a leaf-shaped palatine bone.

== Taxonomy ==
Two of the species of Shantungosuchus, including the type, were described by Yang Zhongjian (referenced here as C.C. (Chung Chien) Young) in 1961. Since the description of S. chuhsienensis, there has been uncertainty about the placement of the genus. It was suggested to be an atoposaurid by several different authors from the 1960s to the 1980s,. However, in Xiao-Chun Wu's 1994 description of S. hangjinensis, he noted the bones were more similar to the family Protosuchidae rather than Atoposauridae, and proposed to classify it as such.

Protosuchia has recently been considered a paraphyletic grouping of early crocodyliforms. Protosuchia is now commonly split into two groups: the basal family Protosuchidae, which is a true clade, and a group of basal crocodyliforms more closely related to Hsisosuchus and Mesoeucrocodylia. Clark et al. (2004) recovered Shantungosuchus as closely related to mesoeucrocodylians, and Buscalioni (2017) found the genus to group in a clade with Sichuanosuchus and Shartegosuchidae, which was formally named Shartegosuchoidea by Dollman et al. (2018) in their description of a new Shartegosuchus specimen.

== Distribution and habitat ==
Shantungosuchus chuhsienensis has been found in the Early Cretaceous (Barremian-Aptian) Mengyin Formation of Shandong province. S. hangjinensis, however, is slightly younger, and is found in the lower Cretaceous Luohandong Formation of Outer Mongolia, and S. brachycephalus may also have been found in the same region. The Luohandong formation provides clues to the environment of Shantungosuchus. For instance, S. hangjinensis likely shared its habitat with fish such as Sinamia, the turtle Ordosemys, and another species of crocodile-like reptile called Ikechosaurus, and several types of dinosaurs- though none have been identified to the level of genus.

== See also ==
- List of crurotarsans
- Sichuanosuchus
