= Zosuchus =

Zosuchus Temporal range: Late Cretaceous

Scientific classification
- Kingdom: Animalia
- Phylum: Chordata
- Class: Reptilia
- Clade: Pseudosuchia
- Clade: Crocodylomorpha
- Clade: Mesoeucrocodylia
- Genus: †Zosuchus; Pol and Norell, 2004

Species
- †Z. davidsonae Pol and Norell, 2004 (type)

Genus of reptiles

Zosuchus ("Zos [Canyon] crocodile") is a genus of basal, Late Cretaceous crocodyliform from Mongolia.

The type species is Z. davidsoni, after preparator Amy Davidson. The name was amended to davidsonae in 2004.

== Discovery ==
It was found in the Redbeds of Zos Canyon (Djadokhta Formation) in the Gobi Desert of Mongolia by expeditions organized by the American Museum of Natural History, and described by palaeontologists Diego Pol and Mark Norell in 2004.

Material of Z. davidsonae consists of five specimens:

- IGM 100/1305 (holotype): isolated skull and lower jaws
- IGM 100/1304
- IGM 100/1306
- IGM 100/1307
- IGM 100/1308

== Morphology ==
This genus had a very short snout.

== Systematics ==
Pol & Norell (2004) found Zosuchus davidsoni to be sister to Sichuanosuchus and Shantungosuchus, the three forming a basal clade of crocodyliforms based on the presence of a ventrally deflected posterior region of the mandibular rami. A 2018 cladistic analysis found Zosuchus, along with Sichuanosuchus, Shantungosuchus, and Shartegosuchidae, to form a basal mesoeucrocodyliform clade, Shartegosuchoidea.

== Sources ==
- Pol, D. & Norell, M. A., (2004). "A new crocodyliform from Zos Canyon, Mongolia". American Museum Novitates 3445: 1-36.
