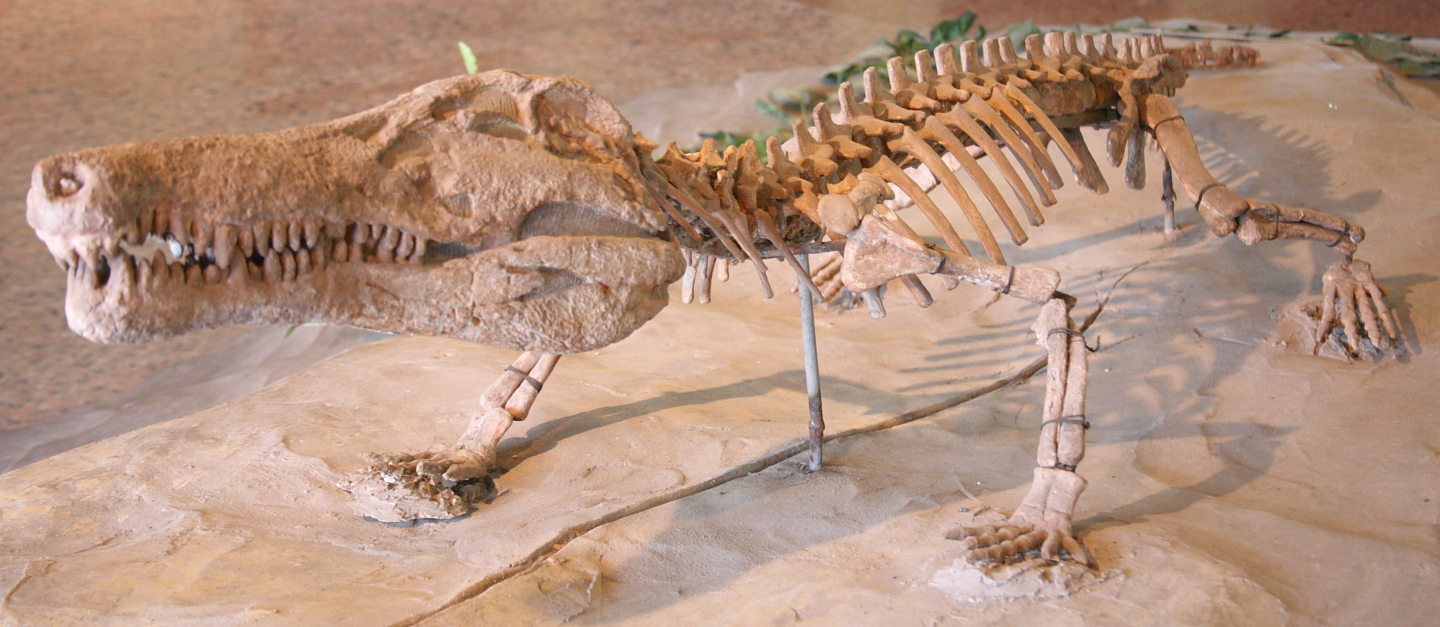
- Mounted H. chungkingensis replica skeleton

Scientific classification
- Kingdom: Animalia
- Phylum: Chordata
- Class: Reptilia
- Clade: Archosauria
- Clade: Pseudosuchia
- Clade: Crocodylomorpha
- Clade: Solidocrania
- Clade: Crocodyliformes
- Clade: Mesoeucrocodylia
- Family: †Hsisosuchidae; Young and Chow, 1953
- Genus: †Hsisosuchus; Young and Chow, 1953

Species
- †H. chungkingensis Young & Chow, 1953 (type); †H. dashanpuensis Gao, 2001; †H. chowi Peng & Shu 2005

= Hsisosuchus =

Hsisosuchus Temporal range: Middle-Late Jurassic

Extinct genus of reptiles

Hsisosuchus is an extinct genus of crocodyliform from China. Currently there are three species within this genus: H. dashanpuensis is from the Middle Jurassic, while H. chungkingensis and H. chowi are from the Late Jurassic. It is likely to have been a medium-sized (~3 metres or 9.8 feet long) predator.

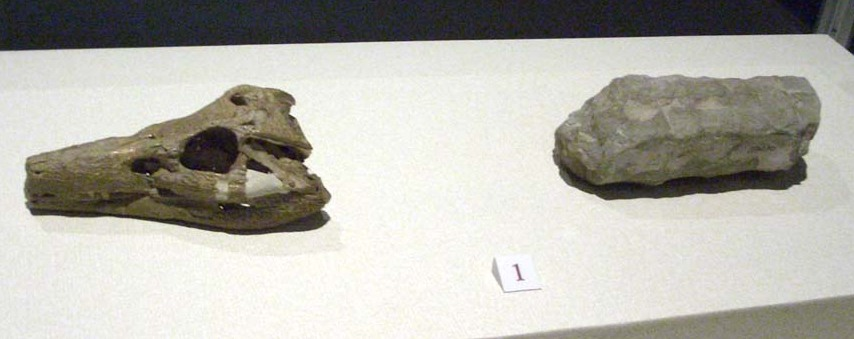
Skull and vertebrae of H. chungkingensis at the Hong Kong Science Museum

Fossils of H. chungkingensis were found in the Shangshaximiao Formation (near Chongqing city). The holotype consists of the cranial skeleton and caudal osteoderms. A more complete specimen was found and described that added significant information on the postcranium of H. chungkingensis.

H. dashanpuensis was found in the Xiashaximiao Formation.

H. chowi was found in the Shangshaximiao Formation. The holotype specimen consists of a nearly complete skull (25 cm (9.8 in) long), mandibles, most of the vertebral column, partial pectoral and pelvic girdles, most of the forelimbs, fragments of hindlimbs and many osteoderms. It differs from other species of Hsisosuchus in several features of its skull and postcrania.
