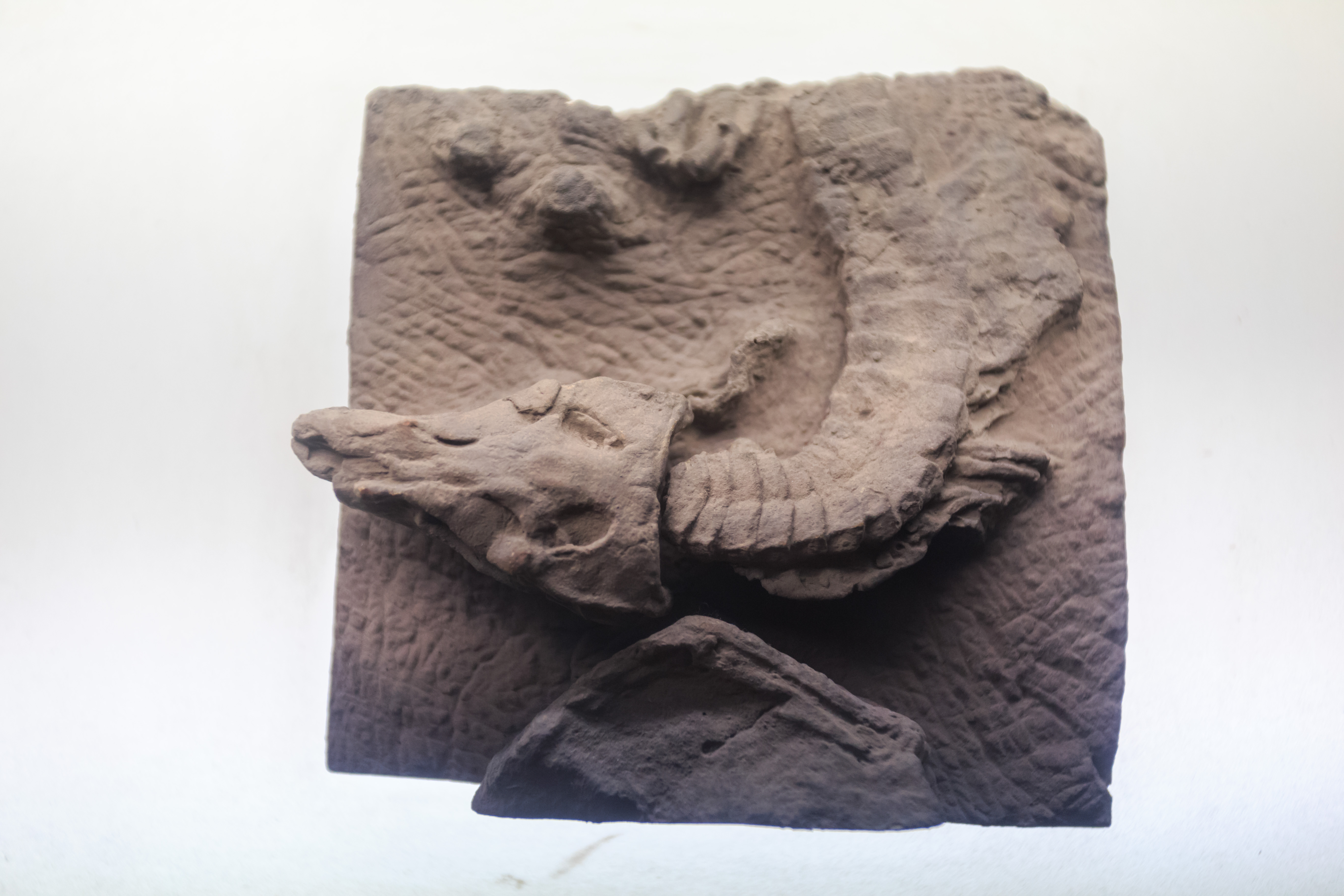
- Fossil

Scientific classification
- Domain: Eukaryota
- Kingdom: Animalia
- Phylum: Chordata
- Class: Reptilia
- Clade: Archosauria
- Clade: Pseudosuchia
- Clade: Crocodylomorpha
- Clade: Crocodyliformes
- Clade: Mesoeucrocodylia
- Clade: †Shartegosuchoidea
- Genus: †Sichuanosuchus; Peng, 1995

Species
- †S. huidongensis Peng, 1995 (type); †S. shuhanensis Wu et al., 1997

= Sichuanosuchus =

Sichuanosuchus Temporal range: Late Jurassic - ?Early Cretaceous150–100.5 Ma

Extinct genus of reptiles

Sichuanosuchus is an extinct genus of crocodyliform from the Late Jurassic and possibly Early Cretaceous of China.

== Systematics ==
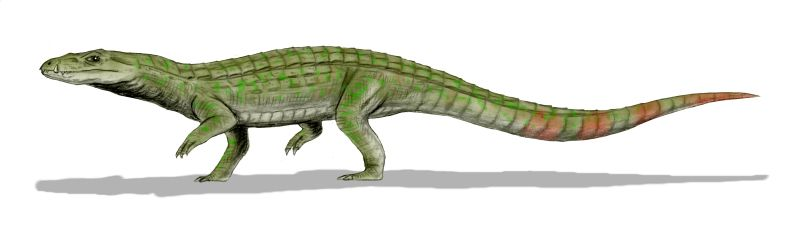
Restoration

Poll and Norell (2004) recovered Sichuanosuchus as sister to Shantungosuchus and Zosuchus based on the presence of a ventrally deflected posterior region of the mandibular rami. Buscalioni (2017) recovered Sichuanosuchus as sister to Shantungosuchus, Zosuchus, and Shartegosuchidae, and Dollman et al. (2018) went further by erecting Shartegosuchoidea for the clade formed by Shartegosuchidae, Sichuanosuchus, Zosuchus, and Shantungosuchus.
