= List of dinosaur genera =

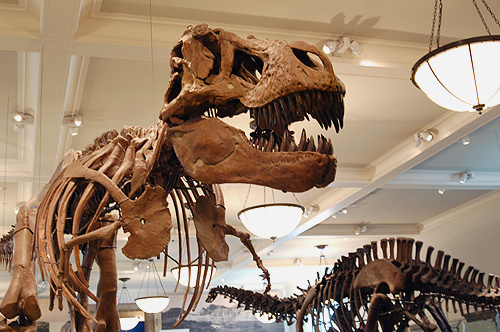
Mounted skeletons of Tyrannosaurus (left) and Apatosaurus (right) at the AMNH

Dinosaurs are a diverse group of reptiles that first appeared during the Triassic period, between 243 and 233.23 million years ago. They became the dominant terrestrial vertebrates after the Triassic–Jurassic extinction event 201.3 million years ago, and their dominance continued throughout the Jurassic and Cretaceous periods. The fossil record demonstrates that birds are modern feathered dinosaurs, having evolved from earlier theropods during the Late Jurassic. Birds were therefore the only dinosaur lineage to survive the Cretaceous–Paleogene extinction event approximately 66 million years ago, and constitute the only known living dinosaurs.

This list of dinosaurs is a comprehensive listing of all genera that have ever been considered to be non-avialan dinosaurs, but also includes some dinosaurs of disputed status as non-avian, as well as purely vernacular terms.

The list includes all commonly accepted genera, but also genera that are now considered invalid, doubtful (nomen dubium), or were not formally published (nomen nudum), as well as junior synonyms and genera that are no longer considered dinosaurs. Many listed names have been reclassified as everything from true birds to crocodilians to petrified wood. The list contains 1,863 names, of which approximately 1,424 are considered either valid dinosaur genera or nomina dubia.

== Scope and terminology ==
There is no official, canonical list of all non-avian dinosaur genera. The closest is the Dinosaur Genera List, compiled by biological nomenclature expert George Olshevsky, which was first published online in 1995 and was regularly updated until June 2021. The most authoritative general source in the field is the second (2004) edition of The Dinosauria. The vast majority of names listed below are sourced to Olshevsky's list, and all subjective determinations (such as junior synonymy or non-dinosaurian status) are based on The Dinosauria, except where they conflict with primary literature. These exceptions are noted.

Naming conventions and terminology follow the International Code of Zoological Nomenclature (ICZN). Technical terms used include:

- Junior synonym: A name which describes the same taxon as a previously published name. If two or more genera are formally designated and the type specimens are later assigned to the same genus, the first to be published (in chronological order) is the senior synonym, and all other instances are junior synonyms. Senior synonyms are generally used, except by special decision of the ICZN (see Tyrannosaurus), but junior synonyms cannot be used again for a different genus, even if deprecated. Junior synonymy is often subjective, unless the genera described were both based on the same type specimen.
- Nomen nudum (Latin for "naked name"): A name that has appeared in print but has not yet been formally published by the standards of the ICZN. Nomina nuda (the plural form) are invalid, and are therefore not italicized as a proper generic name would be. If the name is later formally published, that name is no longer a nomen nudum and will be italicized on this list. Often, the formally published name will differ from any nomina nuda that describe the same specimen.
- Nomen oblitum (Latin for "forgotten name"): A name that has not been used in the scientific community for more than fifty years after its original proposal.
- Nomen manuscriptum (Latin for "manuscript name"): A name that appears in manuscript of a formal publication that has no scientific backing.
- Preoccupied name: A name that is formally published, but which has already been used for another taxon. This second use is invalid (as are all subsequent uses) and the name must be replaced. Preoccupied names are not valid generic names.
- Nomen dubium (Latin for "dubious name"): A name describing a fossil with no unique diagnostic features. As this can be an extremely subjective and controversial designation (see Hadrosaurus), no genera should be marked as such on this list.

== A ==
Contents:	A B C D E F G H I J K L M N O P Q R S T U V W X Y Z – See also

- Aachenosaurus – subsequently found to be a piece of petrified wood
- Aardonyx
- Abdarainurus
- Abditosaurus
- Abelisaurus
- Abrictosaurus
- Abrosaurus
- Abydosaurus
- Acantholipan
- Acanthopholis
- Achelousaurus
- Acheroraptor
- Achillesaurus
- Achillobator
- Acristavus
- Acrocanthosaurus

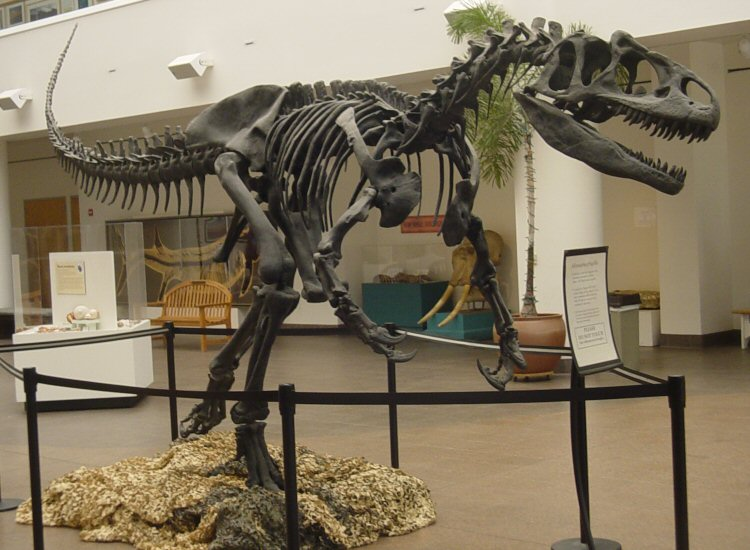
Replica of an Allosaurus skeleton

- Acrotholus
- Actiosaurus – subsequently found to be a choristoderan
- Adamantisaurus
- Adasaurus
- Adelolophus
- Adeopapposaurus
- Adratiklit
- Adynomosaurus
- Aegyptosaurus
- Aeolosaurus
- Aepisaurus
- Aepyornithomimus
- Aerosteon
- Aetonyx – possible junior synonym of Massospondylus
- Afromimus
- Afrovenator
- Agathaumas – possible synonym of Triceratops
- Aggiosaurus – subsequently found to be a metriorhynchid crocodilian
- Agilisaurus
- Agnosphitys – possibly non-dinosaurian
- Agrosaurus – probably a junior synonym of Thecodontosaurus
- Agujaceratops
- Agustinia
- Ahshislepelta
- Ahshislesaurus
- Ahvaytum
- "Airakoraptor" – nomen nudum; Kuru
- Ajancingenia – synonym of Heyuannia
- Ajkaceratops
- Ajnabia
- Akainacephalus
- Alamosaurus
- "Alamotyrannus" – nomen nudum
- "Alashansaurus" – nomen nudum; Shaochilong
- Alaskacephale
- Albalophosaurus
- Albertaceratops
- Albertadromeus
- Albertavenator
- Albertonykus
- Albertosaurus
- Albinykus
- Albisaurus – subsequently found to be a non-dinosaurian reptile
- Alcovasaurus – possible junior synonym of Miragaia
- Alectrosaurus
- Aletopelta

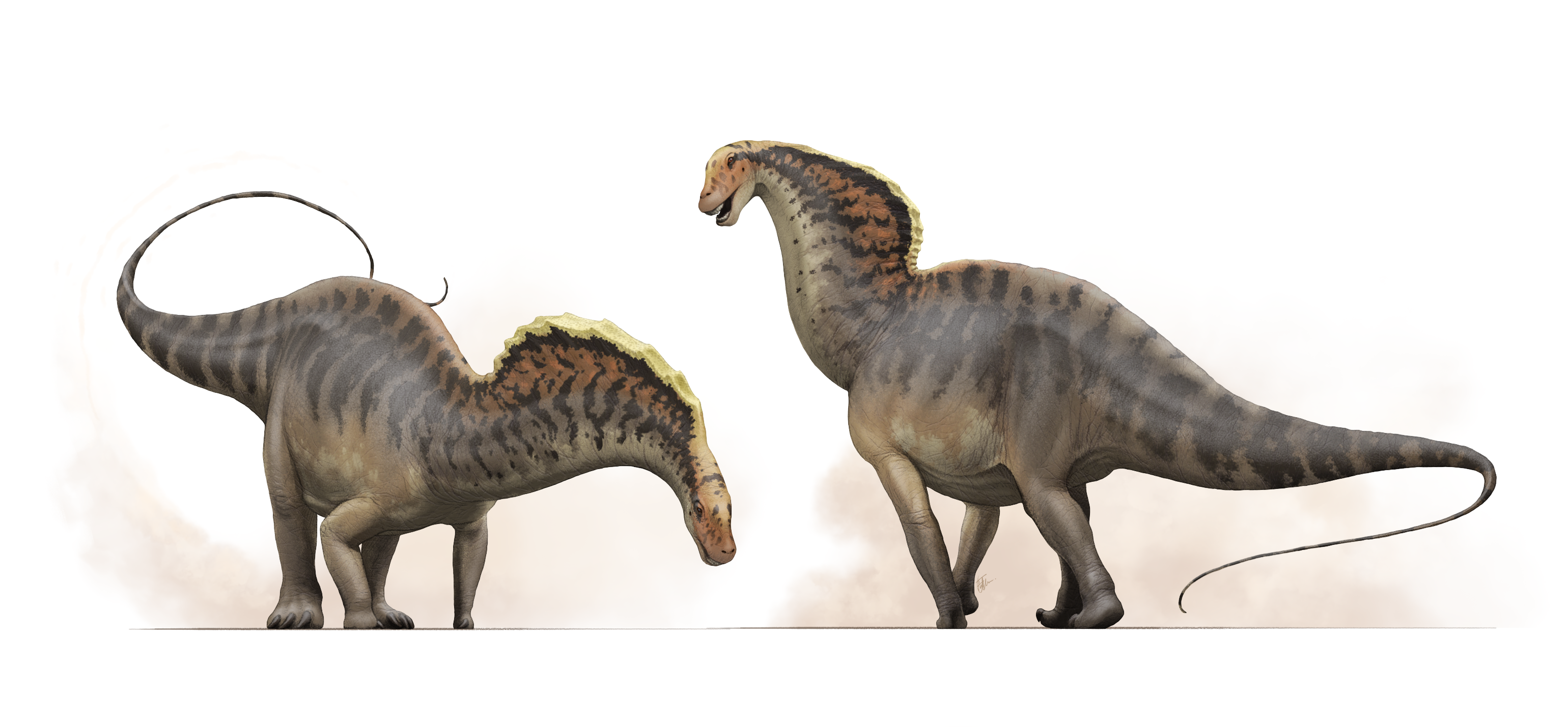
Life reconstruction of Amargasaurus.

- Algoasaurus
- Alioramus
- Aliwalia – junior synonym of Eucnemesaurus
- Allosaurus
- Almas
- Alnashetri
- Alocodon
- Alpkarakush
- Altirhinus
- Altispinax
- Alvarezsaurus
- Alwalkeria – possibly non-dinosaurian
- Alxasaurus
- Amanasaurus – possibly non-dinosaurian
- Amanzia
- Amargasaurus
- "Amargastegos" – nomen nudum
- Amargatitanis
- Amazonsaurus
- Ambopteryx
- Ammosaurus – junior synonym of Anchisaurus
- Ampelognathus
- Ampelosaurus
- Amphicoelias
- "Amphicoelicaudia" – nomen nudum; synonym of Huabeisaurus
- "Amphisaurus" – preoccupied name, now known as Anchisaurus
- Amtocephale
- Amtosaurus – possible junior synonym of Talarurus
- Amurosaurus
- Amygdalodon
- Anabisetia
- Analong
- Anasazisaurus
- Anatosaurus – junior synonym of Edmontosaurus
- Anatotitan – junior synonym of Edmontosaurus
- Anchiceratops
- Anchiornis
- Anchisaurus
- Andesaurus

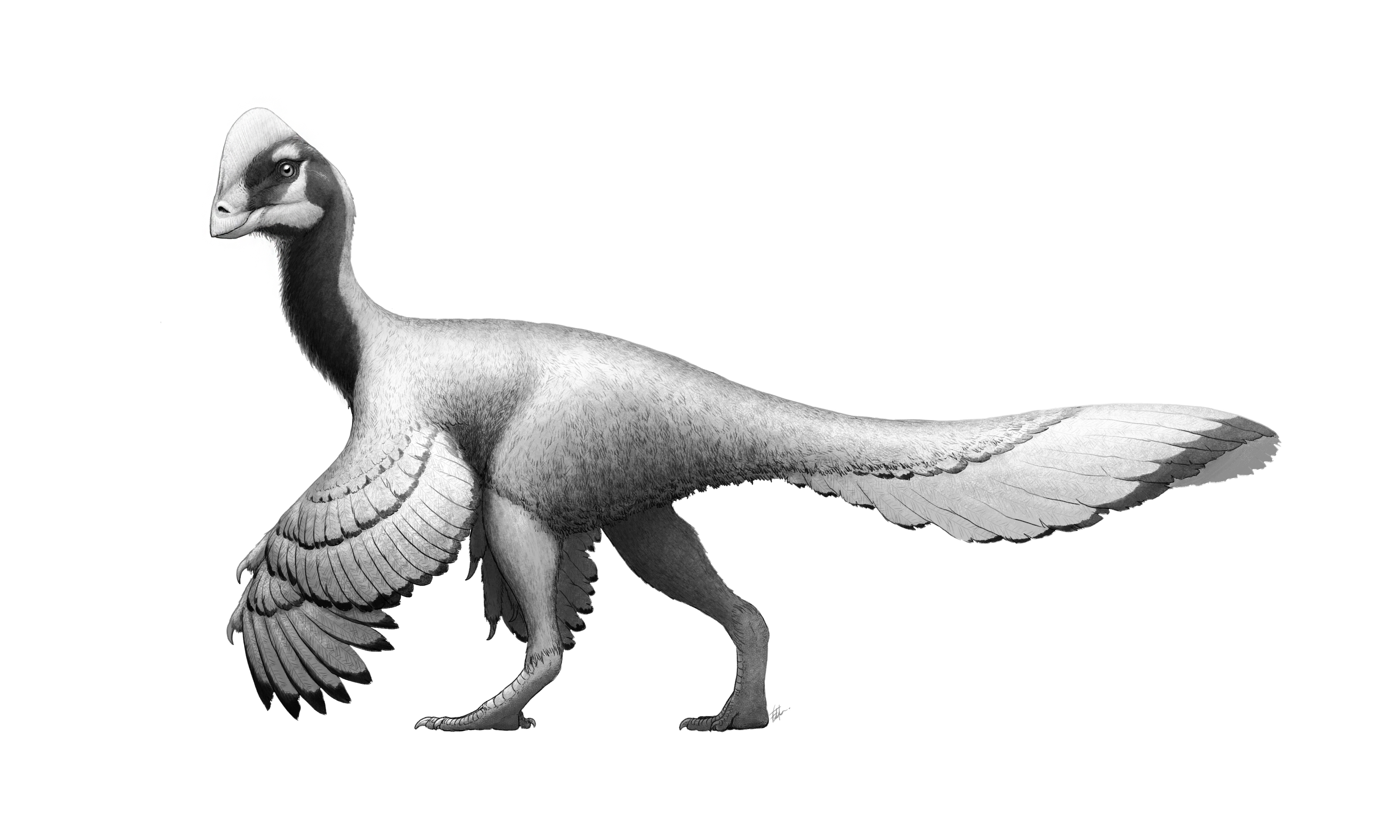
Life reconstruction of Anzu

- "Andhrasaurus" – nomen nudum
- Angaturama – possible junior synonym of Irritator
- "Angloposeidon" – nomen nudum
- Angolatitan
- Angulomastacator
- "Angustungui" – nomen nudum
- Anhuilong
- Aniksosaurus
- Animantarx
- Ankistrodon – subsequently found to be a proterosuchid archosauriform
- Ankylosaurus
- Anodontosaurus
- Anomalipes
- Anoplosaurus
- Anserimimus
- Antarctopelta
- Antarctosaurus
- Anteavis
- Antetonitrus
- Anthodon – subsequently found to be a pareiasaur
- Antrodemus – possible synonym of Allosaurus
- Anzu
- Aoniraptor
- Aorun
- Apatodon – possible junior synonym of Allosaurus
- Apatoraptor
- Apatosaurus
- Appalachiosaurus
- Aquilarhinus
- Aquilops
- Arackar
- Aragosaurus
- Aralosaurus
- Aratasaurus
- "Araucanoraptor" – nomen nudum; Neuquenraptor
- Archaeoceratops
- Archaeocursor
- Archaeodontosaurus

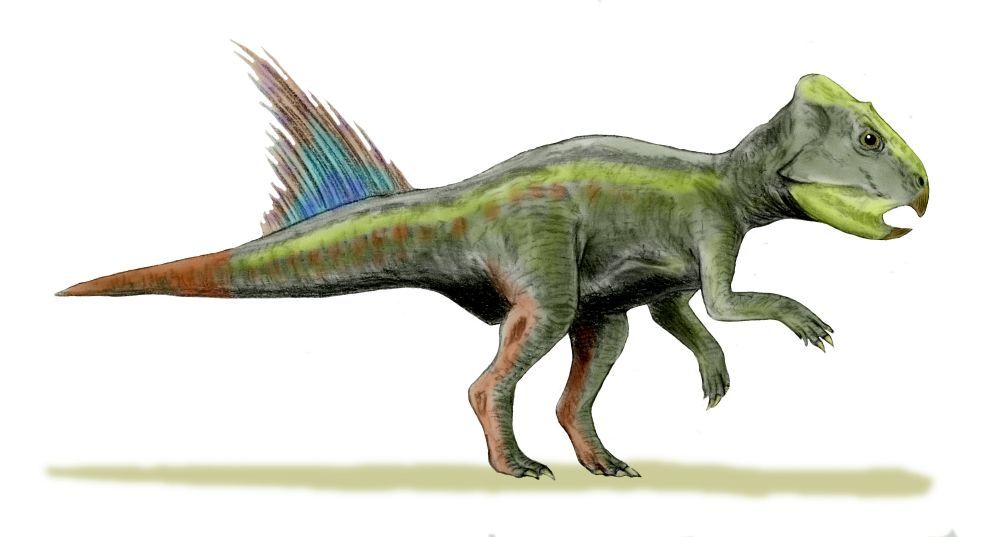
Life restoration of Archaeoceratops

- Archaeopteryx – possibly a bird
- Archaeoraptor – a chimaera of the bird Yanornis and the dromaeosaur Microraptor
- Archaeornis – junior synonym of Archaeopteryx
- Archaeornithoides
- Archaeornithomimus
- Arcovenator
- Arctosaurus – subsequently found to be a non-dinosaurian reptile
- Arcusaurus
- Ardetosaurus
- Arenysaurus
- Argentinosaurus
- Argyrosaurus
- Aristosaurus – possible junior synonym of Massospondylus
- Aristosuchus
- Arizonasaurus – subsequently found to be a rauisuchian
- Arkansaurus
- Arkharavia
- Arrhinoceratops
- Arrudatitan
- Arstanosaurus
- Asfaltovenator
- Asiaceratops
- Asiamericana – a fish
- Asiatosaurus
- Asiatyrannus
- Asilisaurus – possibly non-dinosaurian
- Astigmasaura
- Astrodon
- Astrodonius – junior synonym of Astrodon
- Astrodontaurus – junior synonym of Astrodon
- Astrophocaudia
- Asylosaurus
- Atacamatitan
- Athenar
- Atlantosaurus
- Atlasaurus
- Atlascopcosaurus
- Atrociraptor
- Atsinganosaurus

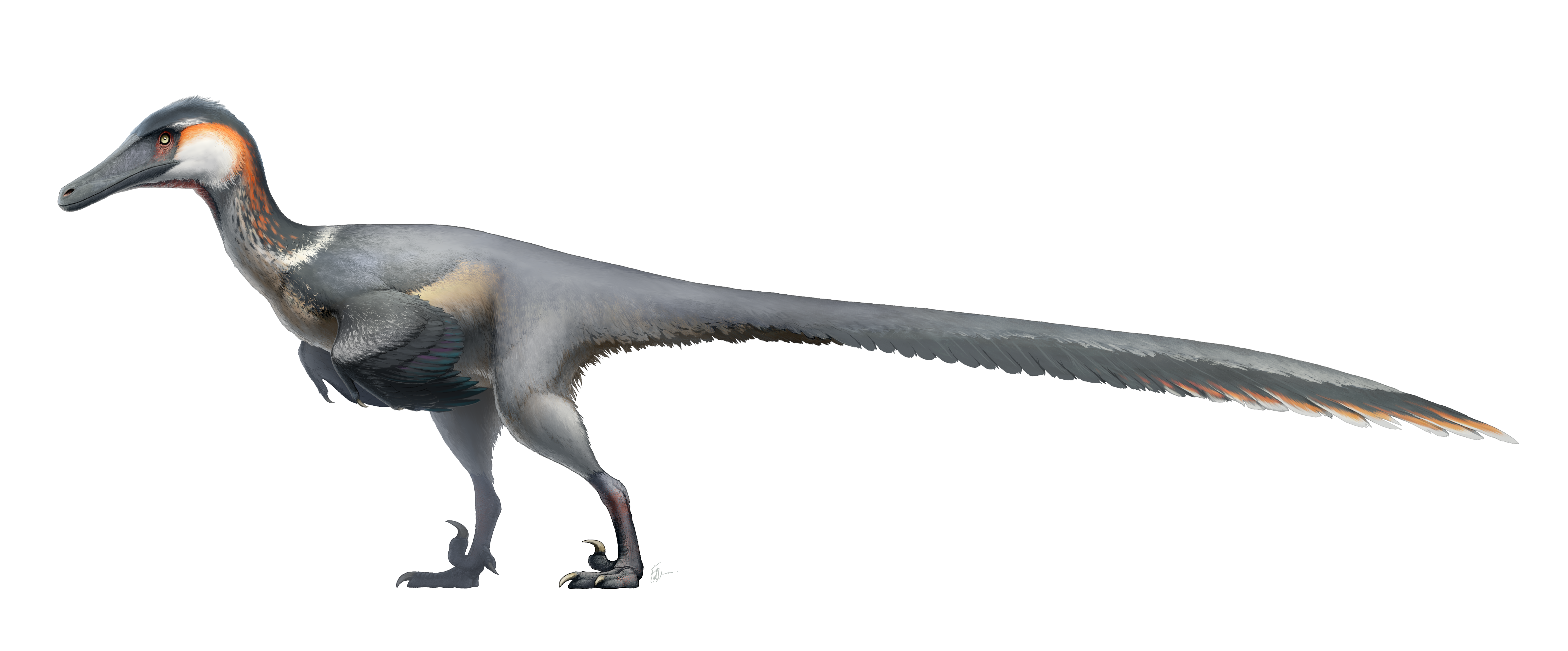
Life restoration of Austroraptor

- Aublysodon
- Aucasaurus
- "Augustia" – preoccupied name, now known as Agustinia
- Augustynolophus
- Auroraceratops
- Aurornis
- Australodocus
- Australotitan
- Australovenator
- Austrocheirus
- Austroposeidon
- Austroraptor
- Austrosaurus
- Avaceratops
- "Avalonia" – preoccupied name, now known as Avalonianus
- Avalonianus – subsequently found to be a non-dinosaurian archosaur
- Aviatyrannis
- Avimimus
- Avipes – probably a non-dinosaurian dinosauromorph
- Avisaurus – subsequently found to be an enantiornithine bird
- Azendohsaurus – subsequently found to be a non-dinosaurian archosauromorph

== B ==
Contents:	A B C D E F G H I J K L M N O P Q R S T U V W X Y Z – See also

- Baalsaurus
- Bactrosaurus
- Bagaceratops
- Bagaraatan
- Bagualia
- Bagualosaurus
- Bahariasaurus
- Bainoceratops
- Baiyinosaurus
- Bajadasaurus
- "Bakesaurus" – nomen nudum; Bactrosaurus
- Balaur – possibly a bird; possible junior synonym of Elopteryx
- "Balochisaurus" – nomen nudum
- Bambiraptor
- Banji
- Bannykus

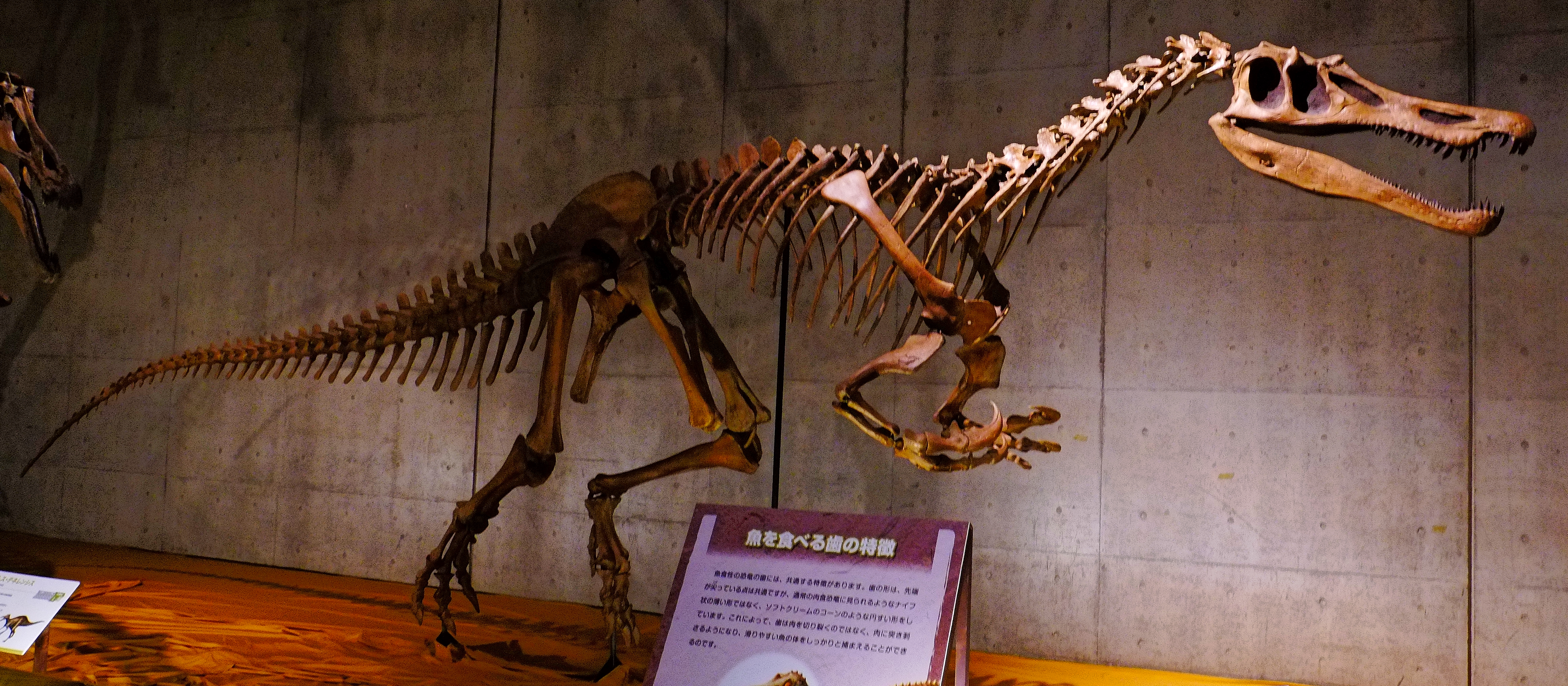
Reconstructed skeletal mount of Baryonyx at the National Museum of Nature and Science, Tokyo

- Baotianmansaurus
- Barapasaurus
- Barilium
- Barosaurus
- Barrosasaurus
- Barsboldia
- Baryonyx
- Bashanosaurus
- Bashunosaurus
- Basutodon – subsequently found to be a non-dinosaurian archosaur
- Bathygnathus – a pelycosaur, Dimetrodon
- Batyrosaurus
- Baurutitan
- Bayannurosaurus
- "Bayosaurus" – nomen nudum
- Becklespinax – junior synonym of Altispinax
- "Beelemodon" – nomen nudum
- Beg
- Beibeilong
- Beipiaognathus – chimera of several unnamed dinosaurs
- Beipiaosaurus
- Beishanlong
- Bellusaurus
- Belodon – subsequently found to be a phytosaur
- Berberosaurus
- Berthasaura
- Betasuchus
- Bicentenaria
- Bicharracosaurus
- Bienosaurus
- "Bihariosaurus" – nomen nudum
- "Bilbeyhallorum" – nomen nudum; Cedarpelta
- "Biscoveosaurus" – nomen nudum
- Bissektipelta
- Bistahieversor
- Bisticeratops
- Blasisaurus
- Blikanasaurus
- Bolong
- Bonapartenykus
- Bonapartesaurus
- Bonatitan
- Bonitasaura
- Borealopelta
- Borealosaurus
- Boreonykus
- Borogovia
- Bothriospondylus
- Brachiosaurus
- Brachyceratops
- Brachylophosaurus
- Brachypodosaurus
- Brachyrophus – junior synonym of Camptosaurus

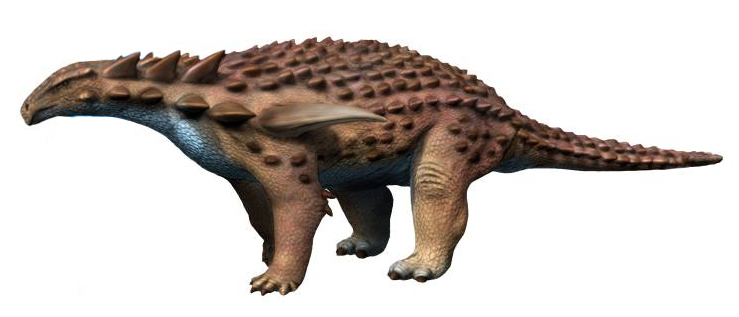
Life restoration of Borealopelta

- Brachytaenius – subsequently found to be a metriorhynchid; junior objective synonym of Dakosaurus or Geosaurus
- Brachytrachelopan
- Bradycneme
- Brasileosaurus – subsequently found to be a non-dinosaurian archosaur
- Brasilotitan
- Bravasaurus
- Bravoceratops
- Breviceratops
- Brighstoneus
- Brohisaurus
- Brontomerus
- "Brontoraptor" – nomen nudum; synonym of Torvosaurus
- Brontosaurus
- Brontotholus
- Bruhathkayosaurus
- Bugenasaura – junior synonym of Thescelosaurus
- Buitreraptor
- Burianosaurus
- Buriolestes
- Bustingorrytitan
- "Byranjaffia" – nomen nudum; Byronosaurus
- Byronosaurus

== C ==
Contents:	A B C D E F G H I J K L M N O P Q R S T U V W X Y Z – See also

- Caenagnathasia
- Caenagnathus
- Caieiria
- Caihong
- Calamosaurus
- "Calamospondylus" – preoccupied name, now known as Calamosaurus
- Calamospondylus
- Caletodraco
- Callovosaurus
- Calvarius
- Camarasaurus
- Camarillasaurus
- Camelotia
- Campananeyen
- Camposaurus
- "Camptonotus" – preoccupied name, now known as Camptosaurus
- Camptosaurus
- "Campylodon" – preoccupied name, now known as Campylodoniscus
- Campylodoniscus
- Canardia
- "Capitalsaurus" – nomen nudum
- Carcharodontosaurus
- Cardiodon
- Cariocecus
- Carnotaurus
- Caseosaurus
- Cathartesaura
- Cathetosaurus — possibly a species of Camarasaurus

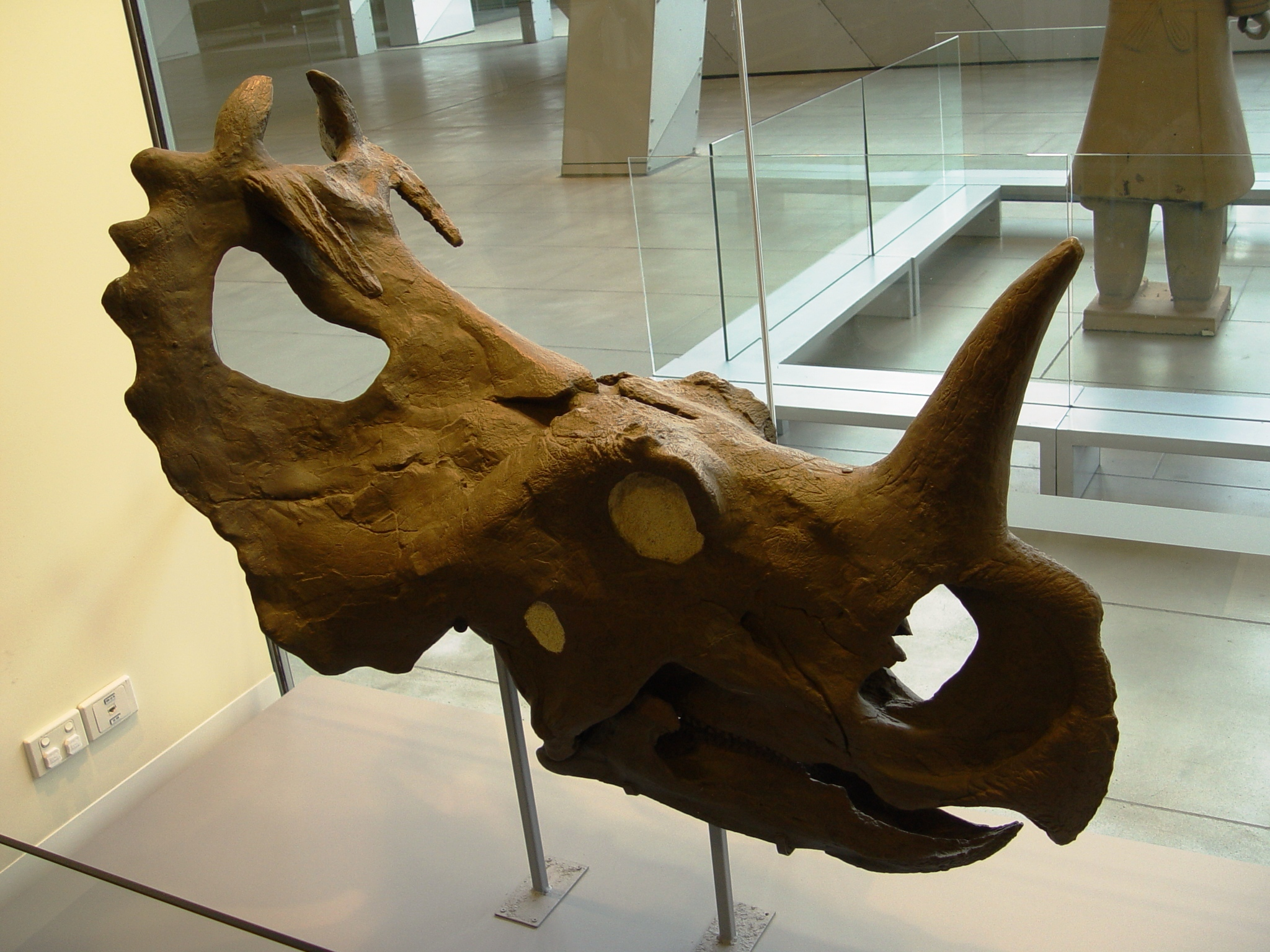
Centrosaurus skull

- Caudipteryx
- Caudocoelus – junior synonym of Teinurosaurus
- Caulodon – junior synonym of Camarasaurus
- Cedarosaurus
- Cedarpelta
- Cedrorestes
- Centemodon – subsequently found to be a phytosaur
- Centrosaurus
- Cerasinops
- Ceratocaudia
- Ceratonykus
- Ceratops
- Ceratosaurus
- Ceratosuchops
- Cetiosauriscus
- Cetiosaurus
- Chadititan
- Chakisaurus
- Changchunsaurus
- "Changdusaurus" – nomen nudum
- Changmiania
- Changyuraptor
- Changzhousaurus
- Chaoyangsaurus
- Charonosaurus
- Chasmosaurus
- Chassternbergia – junior synonym of Edmontonia
- Chebsaurus
- Chenanisaurus
- Cheneosaurus – junior synonym of Hypacrosaurus
- Chialingosaurus
- Chiayusaurus
- Chienkosaurus – possible junior synonym of Szechuanosaurus
- "Chihuahuasaurus" – nomen nudum; Sonorasaurus
- Chilantaisaurus
- Chilesaurus
- Chindesaurus
- Chingkankousaurus
- Chinshakiangosaurus
- Chirostenotes
- Choconsaurus
- Chondrosteosaurus

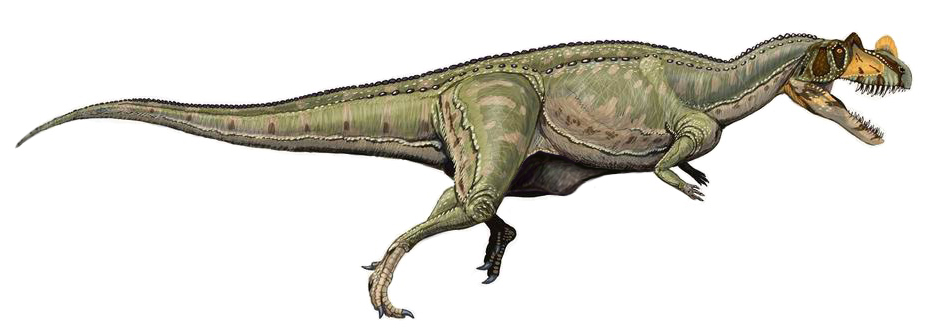
Life restoration of Ceratosaurus

- Choyrodon
- Chromogisaurus
- Chuandongocoelurus
- Chuanjiesaurus
- Chuanqilong
- Chubutisaurus
- Chucarosaurus
- Chungkingosaurus
- Chuxiongosaurus
- Cienciargentina
- "Cinizasaurus" – nomen nudum
- Cionodon
- Citipati
- Citipes
- Cladeiodon – subsequently found to be a non-dinosaurian rauisuchian; synonym of Teratosaurus
- Claorhynchus – possibly Triceratops
- Claosaurus
- Clarencea – subsequently found to be a sphenosuchian; synonym of Sphenosuchus
- Clasmodosaurus
- Clepsysaurus – subsequently found to be a phytosaur, possibly Palaeosaurus
- Coahuilaceratops
- Coahuilasaurus
- Coelophysis
- "Coelosaurus" – preoccupied genus name, species "Coelosaurus" antiquus
- Coeluroides
- Coelurosauravus – subsequently found to be a primitive diapsid
- Coelurus
- Colepiocephale
- "Coloradia" – preoccupied name, now known as Coloradisaurus
- Coloradisaurus
- "Colossosaurus" – nomen nudum; Pelorosaurus
- Comahuesaurus
- "Comanchesaurus" – nomen nudum
- Compsognathus

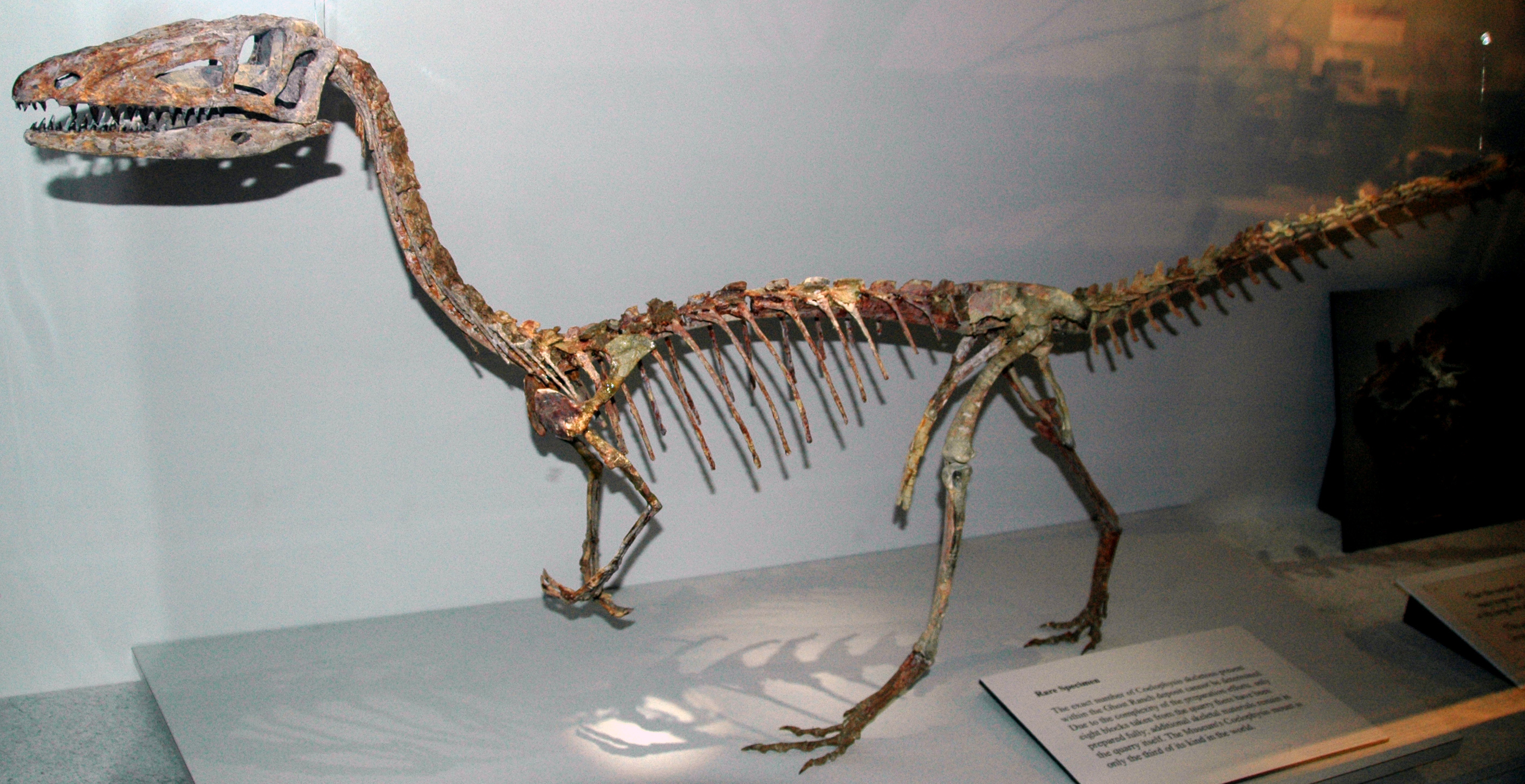
Coelophysis mounted skeleton at the Cleveland Museum of Natural History

- Compsosuchus
- Comptonatus
- Concavenator
- Conchoraptor
- Condorraptor
- Convolosaurus
- Coronosaurus
- Corythoraptor
- Corythosaurus
- Craspedodon
- Crataeomus – junior synonym of Struthiosaurus
- Craterosaurus
- Creosaurus – junior synonym of Allosaurus
- Crichtonpelta
- Crichtonsaurus
- Cristatusaurus
- Crittendenceratops
- Crosbysaurus – subsequently found to be a non-dinosaurian archosauriform
- Cruxicheiros
- Cryolophosaurus
- Cryptarcus
- Cryptodraco – junior synonym (unneeded replacement name) of Cryptosaurus
- "Cryptoraptor" – nomen nudum
- Cryptosaurus
- Cryptovolans – junior synonym of Microraptor
- Cumnoria

== D ==
Contents:	A B C D E F G H I J K L M N O P Q R S T U V W X Y Z – See also

- Daanosaurus
- Dacentrurus
- "Dachongosaurus" – nomen nudum
- Daemonosaurus
- Dahalokely
- Dakosaurus – subsequently found to be a metriorhynchid crocodilian
- Dakotadon
- Dakotaraptor
- Daliansaurus
- "Damalasaurus" – nomen nudum
- Dandakosaurus
- Danubiosaurus – junior synonym of Struthiosaurus
- "Daptosaurus" – nomen nudum; early manuscript name for Deinonychus
- Darwinsaurus – junior synonym of Hypselospinus or Mantellisaurus
- Dashanpusaurus
- Dasosaurus
- Daspletosaurus
- Dasygnathoides – subsequently found to be a non-dinosaurian archosaur; possible junior synonym of Ornithosuchus
- "Dasygnathus" – preoccupied name, now known as Dasygnathoides
- Datai
- Datanglong

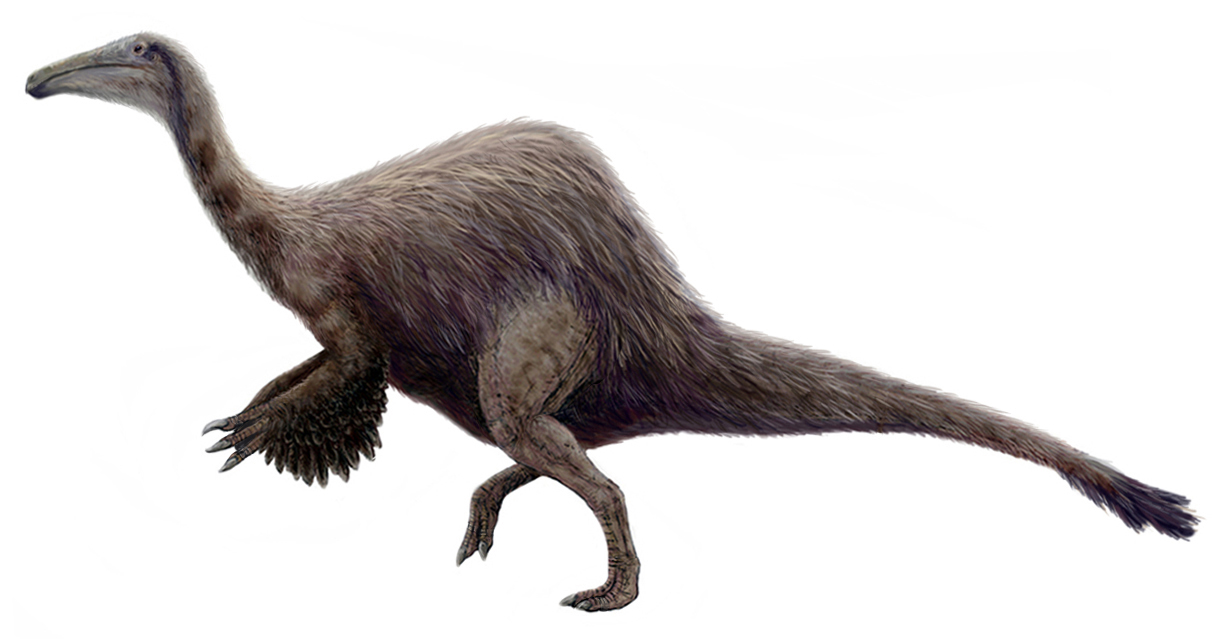
Life restoration of Deinocheirus

- Datonglong
- Datousaurus
- Daurlong
- Daurosaurus – synonym of Kulindadromeus
- Daxiatitan
- Deinocheirus
- Deinodon – possibly Gorgosaurus
- Deinonychus
- Delapparentia – junior synonym of Iguanodon
- Deltadromeus
- Demandasaurus
- Denversaurus
- Deuterosaurus – subsequently found to be a therapsid
- Diabloceratops
- Diamantinasaurus
- Dianchungosaurus – subsequently found to be a crocodilian
- "Diceratops" – preoccupied name, now known as Nedoceratops
- Diceratus – junior synonym of Nedoceratops
- Diclonius
- Dicraeosaurus
- Didanodon – possible synonym of Lambeosaurus; possibly a nomen nudum
- Dilong
- Dilophosaurus
- Diluvicursor
- Dimodosaurus – junior synonym of Plateosaurus
- Dineobellator
- Dinevenator
- Dinheirosaurus – possible junior synonym of Supersaurus
- Dinodocus
- "Dinosaurus" – preoccupied name for a junior synonym of Brithopus; now a junior synonym of Plateosaurus

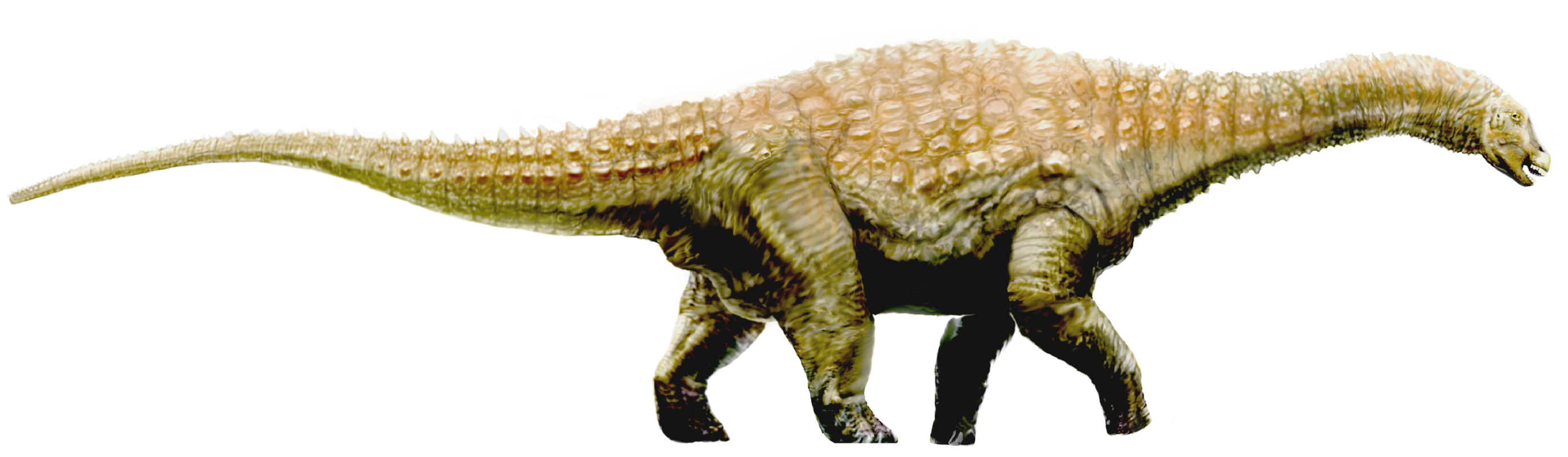
Life restoration of Diamantinasaurus

- Dinotyrannus – junior synonym Tyrannosaurus or some other tyrannosaurid
- Diodorus – possibly non-dinosaurian
- Diplodocus
- Diplotomodon
- Diracodon – junior synonym of Stegosaurus
- Diuqin
- Dolichosuchus
- Dollodon – junior synonym of Mantellisaurus
- "Domeykosaurus" – nomen nudum; synonym of Arackar
- Dongbeititan
- Dongyangopelta
- Dongyangosaurus
- Doolysaurus
- Doratodon – subsequently found to be a crocodilian
- Dornraptor
- Doryphorosaurus – junior synonym (unneeded replacement name) of Kentrosaurus
- Draconyx
- Dracopelta
- Dracoraptor
- Dracorex – possible junior synonym of Pachycephalosaurus
- Dracovenator
- Dravidosaurus – possibly non-dinosaurian
- Dreadnoughtus
- Drinker – possible junior synonym of Nanosaurus
- Dromaeosauroides
- Dromaeosaurus
- Dromiceiomimus
- Dromicosaurus – possible junior synonym of Massospondylus
- Drusilasaura
- Dryosaurus

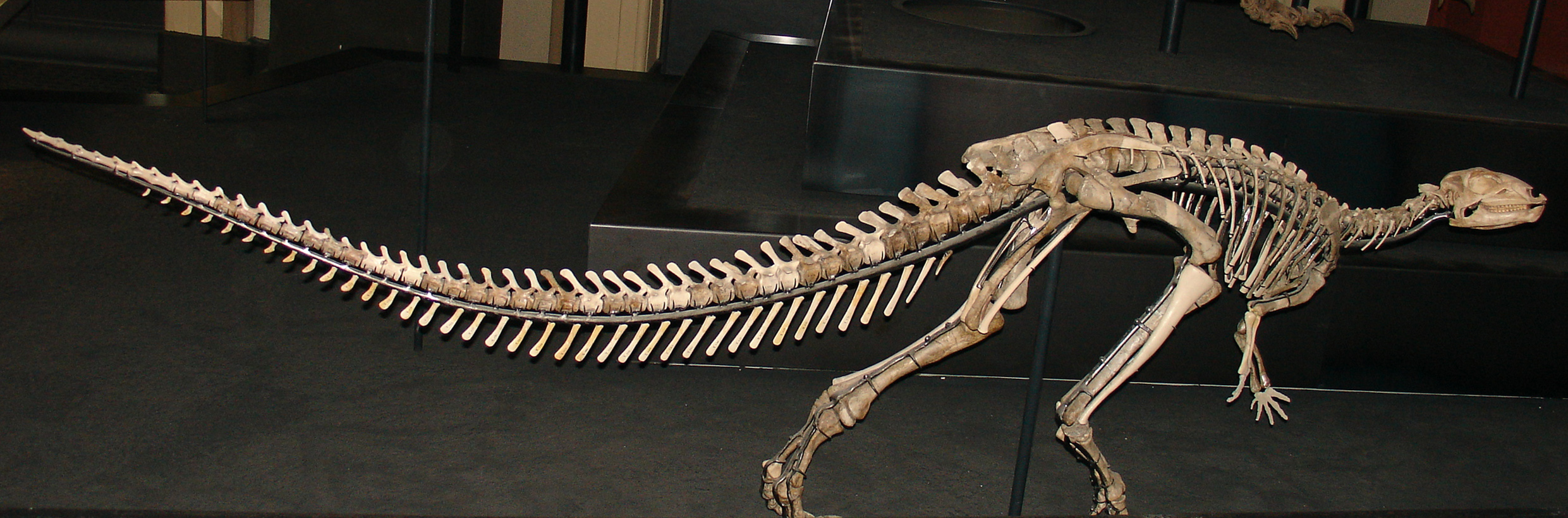
A Dysalotosaurus skeleton

- Dryptosauroides
- Dryptosaurus
- Dubreuillosaurus
- Duonychus
- "Duranteceratops" – nomen nudum
- Duriatitan
- Duriavenator
- Dynamosaurus – junior synonym of Tyrannosaurus
- Dynamoterror
- Dyoplosaurus
- Dysalotosaurus
- Dysganus
- Dyslocosaurus
- Dystrophaeus
- Dystylosaurus – junior synonym of Supersaurus
- Dzharacursor
- Dzharaonyx
- Dzharatitanis

== E ==
Contents:	A B C D E F G H I J K L M N O P Q R S T U V W X Y Z – See also

- Echinodon
- "Echizensaurus" – nomen nudum
- Edmarka – junior synonym of Torvosaurus
- Edmontonia
- Edmontosaurus
- Efraasia

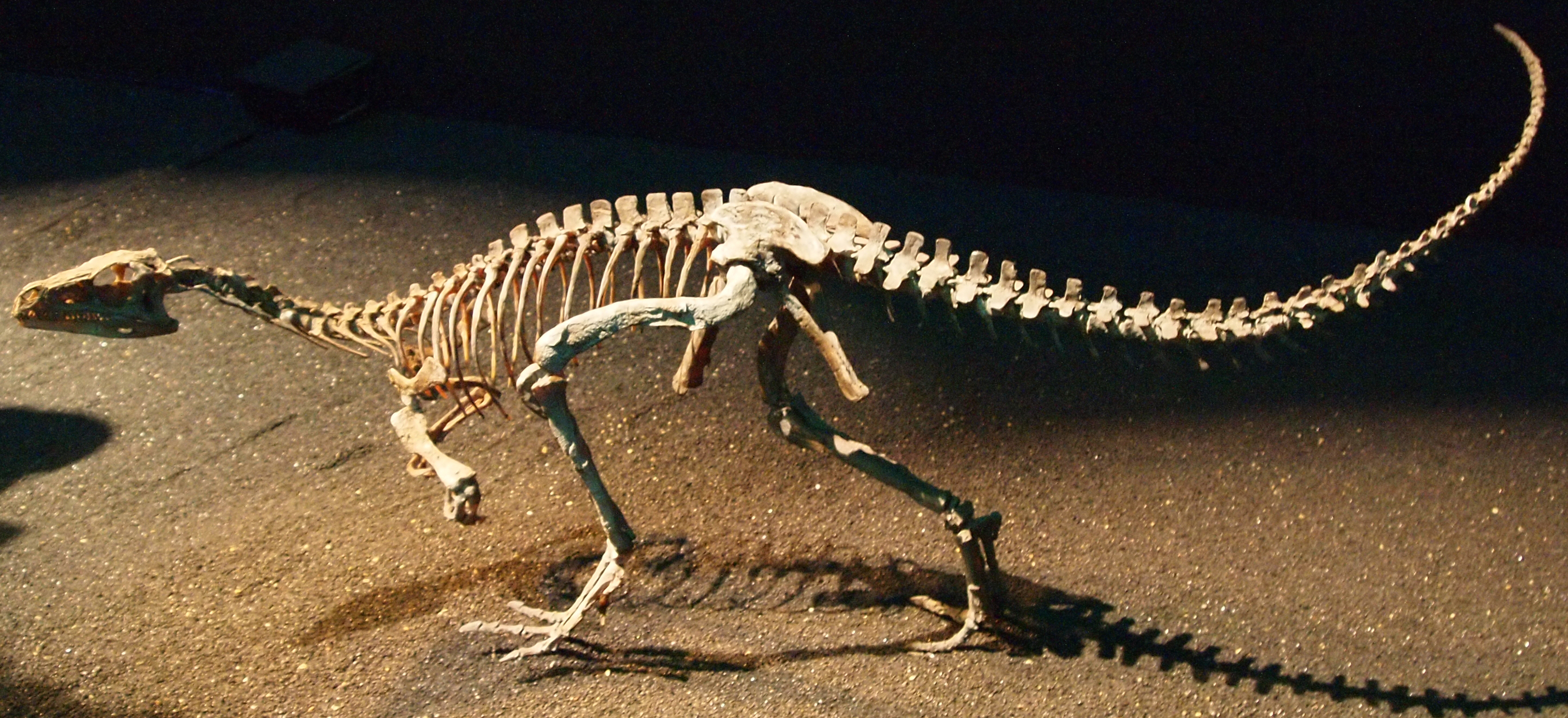
Replica of an Eoraptor skeleton

- Einiosaurus
- Ekrixinatosaurus
- Elachistosuchus – subsequently found to be a rhynchocephalian
- Elaltitan
- Elaphrosaurus
- Elemgasem
- Elmisaurus
- Elopteryx – possibly a bird
- Elosaurus – junior synonym of Brontosaurus
- Elrhazosaurus
- "Elvisaurus" – nomen nudum; Cryolophosaurus
- Emausaurus
- Embasaurus
- Emiliasaura
- Enigmacursor
- Enigmosaurus
- Eoabelisaurus
- Eobrontosaurus – junior synonym of Brontosaurus
- Eocarcharia
- Eoceratops – junior synonym of Chasmosaurus
- Eocursor
- Eodromaeus
- "Eohadrosaurus" – nomen nudum; Eolambia
- Eolambia
- Eomamenchisaurus
- Eoneophron
- Eopinacosaurus
- "Eoplophysis" – nomen nudum
- Eoraptor
- Eosinopteryx
- Eotrachodon
- Eotriceratops
- Eotyrannus
- Eousdryosaurus
- Epachthosaurus
- Epanterias – possible synonym of Allosaurus
- "Ephoenosaurus" – nomen nudum; Machimosaurus (a crocodilian)
- Epicampodon – subsequently found to be a proterosuchid archosauriform, Ankistrodon
- Epichirostenotes
- Epidendrosaurus – synonym of Scansoriopteryx
- Epidexipteryx
- Equijubus
- Erectopus
- Erketu

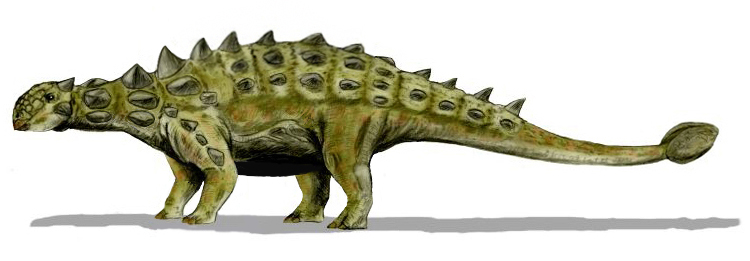
Life restoration of Euoplocephalus

- Erliansaurus
- Erlikosaurus
- Erythrovenator
- Eshanosaurus
- "Euacanthus" – nomen nudum; junior synonym of Polacanthus
- Eucamerotus
- Eucentrosaurus – junior synonym (unneeded replacement name) of Centrosaurus
- Eucercosaurus
- Eucnemesaurus
- Eucoelophysis – possibly non-dinosaurian
- "Eugongbusaurus" – nomen nudum
- Euhelopus
- Euoplocephalus
- Eupodosaurus – subsequently found to be a nothosaur synonymous with Lariosaurus
- "Eureodon" – nomen nudum; Tenontosaurus
- Eurolimnornis – subsequently found to be a pterosaur
- Euronychodon
- Europasaurus
- Europatitan
- Europelta
- Euskelosaurus
- Eustreptospondylus

== F ==
Contents:	A B C D E F G H I J K L M N O P Q R S T U V W X Y Z – See also

- Fabrosaurus – possibly Lesothosaurus
- Falcarius
- "Fendusaurus" – nomen nudum
- "Fenestrosaurus" – nomen nudum; Oviraptor
- Ferenceratops
- Ferganasaurus
- "Ferganastegos" – nomen nudum
- Ferganocephale
- Ferrisaurus
- "Ferropectis" – nomen nudum
- Fona
- Foraminacephale
- Foskeia
- Fosterovenator
- Fostoria
- "Francoposeidon" – nomen nudum
- Frenguellisaurus – junior synonym of Herrerasaurus

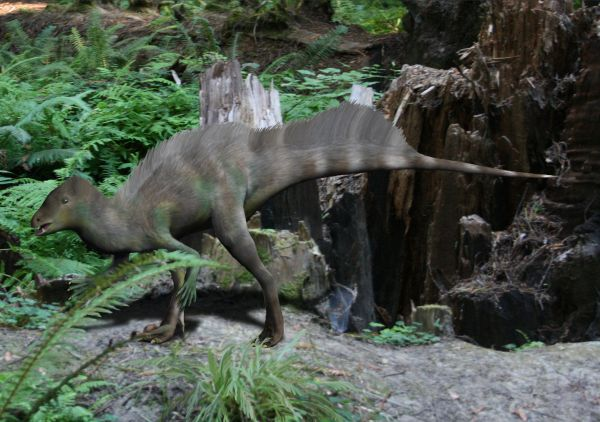
Life restoration of Fruitadens

- Fruitadens
- Fujianvenator
- Fukuiraptor
- Fukuisaurus
- Fukuititan
- Fukuivenator
- Fulengia
- Fulgurotherium
- Furcatoceratops
- Fushanosaurus
- "Fusinasus" – nomen nudum; Eotyrannus
- Fusuisaurus
- "Futabasaurus" – nomen nudum; not to be confused with the formally named plesiosaur Futabasaurus
- Futalognkosaurus
- Fylax

== G ==
Contents:	A B C D E F G H I J K L M N O P Q R S T U V W X Y Z – See also

- "Gadolosaurus" – nomen nudum
- Galeamopus
- Galesaurus – subsequently found to be a therapsid
- Galleonosaurus
- Gallimimus
- Galtonia – subsequently found to be a pseudosuchian; possible junior synonym of Revueltosaurus
- Galveosaurus – synonym of Galvesaurus
- Galvesaurus
- Gamatavus — possibly non-dinosaurian
- Gandititan
- Gannansaurus
- "Gansutitan" – nomen nudum; Daxiatitan
- Ganzhousaurus
- Gargoyleosaurus
- Garrigatitan
- Garudimimus
- Garumbatitan
- Gasosaurus

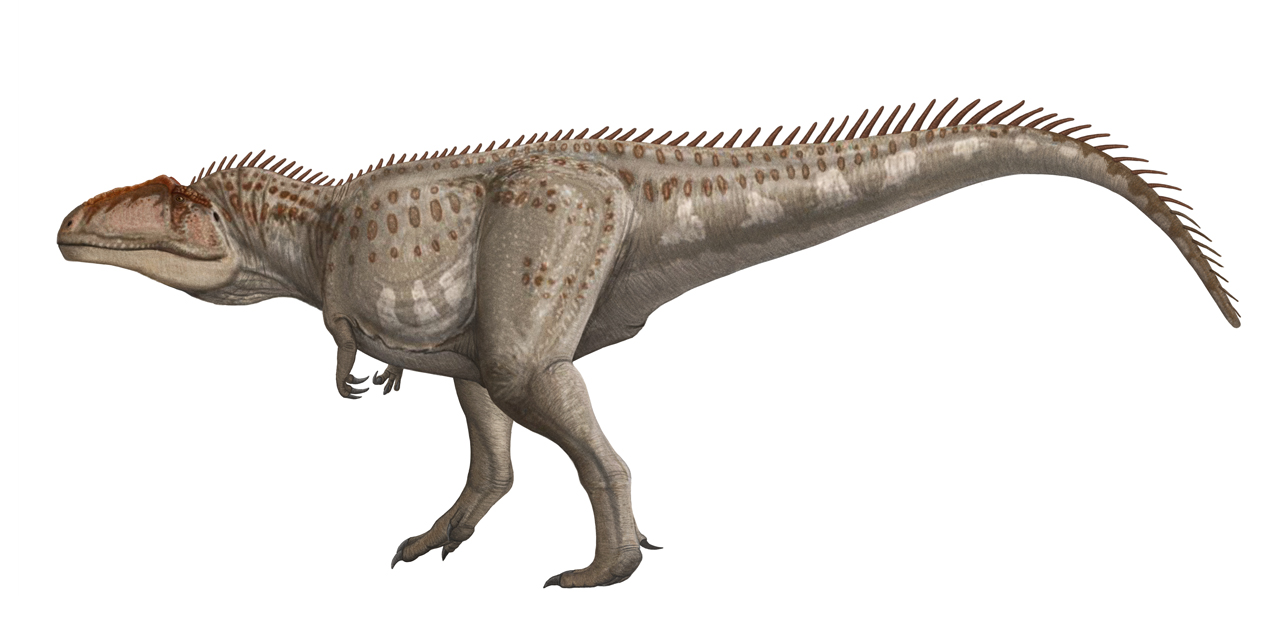
Life restoration of Giganotosaurus

- Gasparinisaura
- Gastonia
- "Gavinosaurus" – nomen nudum; Eotyrannus
- Geminiraptor – possible junior synonym of Falcarius
- Genusaurus
- Genyodectes
- Geranosaurus
- Gideonmantellia
- Giganotosaurus
- Gigantoraptor
- "Gigantosaurus" – preoccupied name, now known as Tornieria
- Gigantosaurus
- Gigantoscelus – Probable junior synonym of Euskelosaurus
- Gigantspinosaurus
- Gilmoreosaurus
- Gilmoretyrannus
- "Ginnareemimus" – nomen nudum; Kinnareemimus
- Giraffatitan
- Glacialisaurus
- Glishades
- Glyptodontopelta
- Gnathovorax
- Gobiceratops – possible junior synonym of Bagaceratops
- Gobihadros
- Gobiraptor
- Gobisaurus
- Gobititan
- Gobivenator
- "Godzillasaurus" – nomen nudum; Gojirasaurus
- Gojirasaurus
- Gondwanatitan
- Gondwanax — possibly non-dinosaurian
- Gongbusaurus
- Gongpoquansaurus
- Gongshuilong
- Gongxianosaurus
- Gonkoken
- Gorgosaurus
- Goyocephale

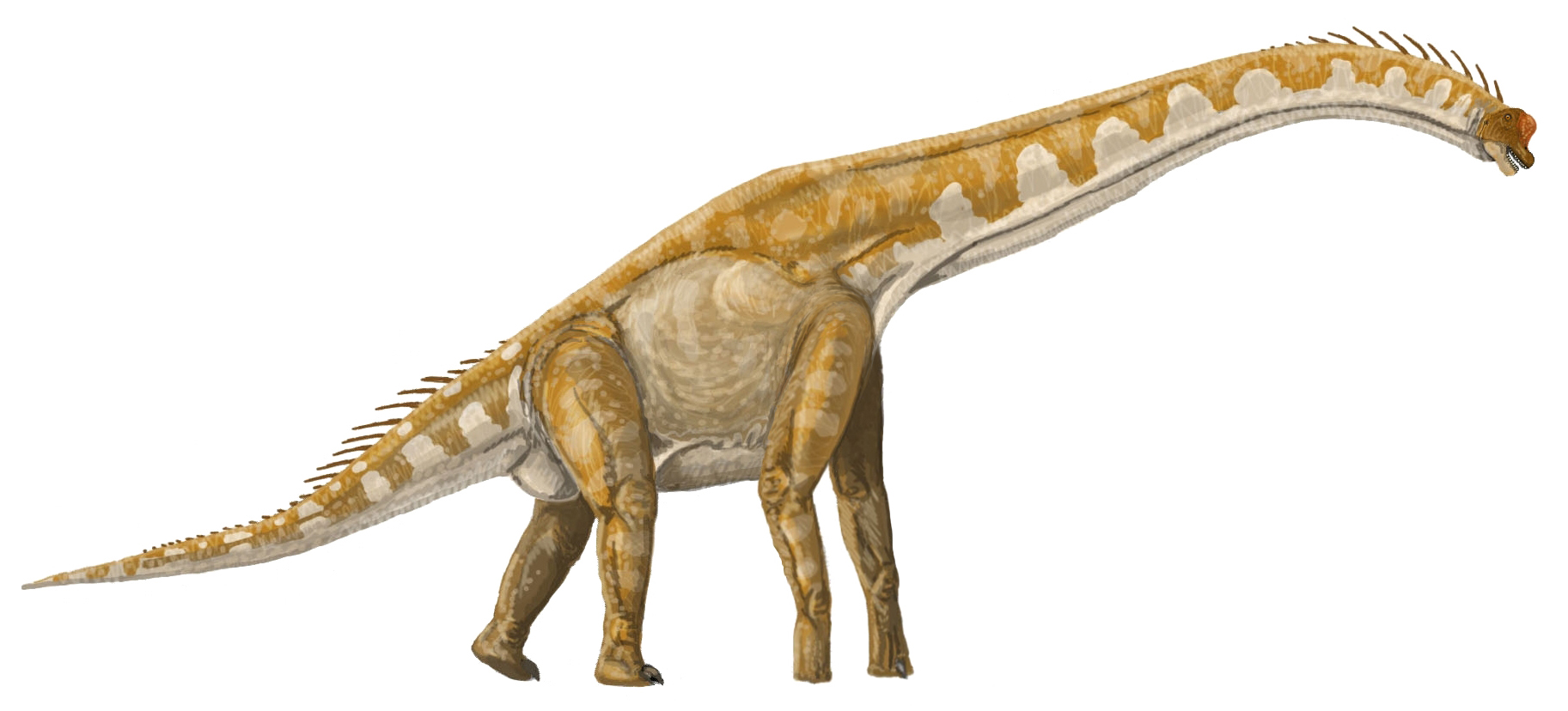
Life reconstruction of Giraffatitan

- Graciliceratops
- Graciliraptor
- Gracilisuchus – subsequently found to be a non-dinosaurian archosaur
- Gravitholus – possible junior synonym of Stegoceras
- Gremlin
- Gresslyosaurus – possible junior synonym of Plateosaurus
- Griphornis – junior synonym of Archaeopteryx
- Griphosaurus – junior synonym of Archaeopteryx
- Gryphoceratops
- Gryponyx
- Gryposaurus
- "Gspsaurus" – nomen nudum
- Guaibasaurus
- Gualicho
- Guanlong
- Guemesia
- Gwyneddosaurus – subsequently found to be a tanystrophid
- Gyposaurus – possible junior synonym of Massospondylus

== H ==
Contents:	A B C D E F G H I J K L M N O P Q R S T U V W X Y Z – See also

- "Hadrosauravus" – nomen nudum; junior synonym of Gryposaurus
- Hadrosaurus
- Haestasaurus
- Hagryphus
- Hallopus – subsequently found to be a crocodylomorph
- Halszkaraptor
- Halticosaurus
- Hamititan
- Hanssuesia – possible junior synonym of Stegoceras
- "Hanwulosaurus" – nomen nudum
- Haolong
- Haplocanthosaurus
- "Haplocanthus" – preoccupied name, now known as Haplocanthosaurus
- Haplocheirus
- Harenadraco
- Harpymimus
- Haya
- Hecatasaurus – junior synonym of Telmatosaurus
- "Heilongjiangosaurus" – nomen nudum
- Heishansaurus
- Helioceratops

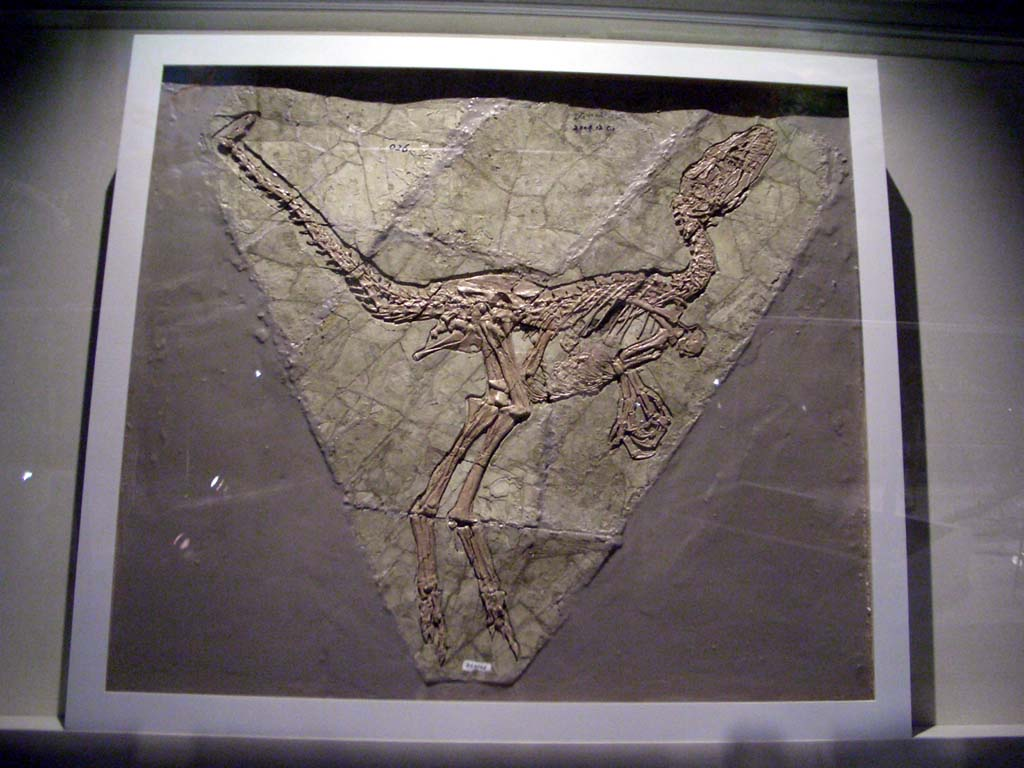
Huaxiagnathus fossil displayed in Hong Kong Science Museum

- "Helopus" – preoccupied name, now known as Euhelopus
- Heptasteornis
- Herbstosaurus – subsequently found to be a pterosaur
- Herrerasaurus
- Hesperonychus
- Hesperonyx
- Hesperornithoides
- Hesperosaurus
- Heterodontosaurus
- Heterosaurus – possible synonym of Mantellisaurus
- Hexing
- Hexinlusaurus
- Heyuannia
- Hierosaurus
- Hikanodon – junior synonym of Iguanodon
- Hippodraco
- "Hironosaurus" – nomen nudum
- "Hisanohamasaurus" – nomen nudum
- Histriasaurus
- Homalocephale
- "Honghesaurus" – nomen nudum later described as Yandusaurus; name later used for a genus of marine reptile
- Hongshanosaurus – junior synonym of Psittacosaurus
- Hoplitosaurus
- Hoplosaurus – junior synonym of Struthiosaurus
- Horshamosaurus
- Hortalotarsus – possible junior synonym of Massospondylus
- Huabeisaurus
- Huadanosaurus
- Hualianceratops
- Huallasaurus
- Huanansaurus
- Huanghetitan
- Huangshanlong
- Huashanosaurus
- Huaxiagnathus
- Huaxiaosaurus – junior synonym of Shantungosaurus
- "Huaxiasaurus" – nomen nudum; Huaxiagnathus
- Huaxiazhoulong
- Huayangosaurus
- Huayracursor
- Hudiesaurus
- Huehuecanauhtlus

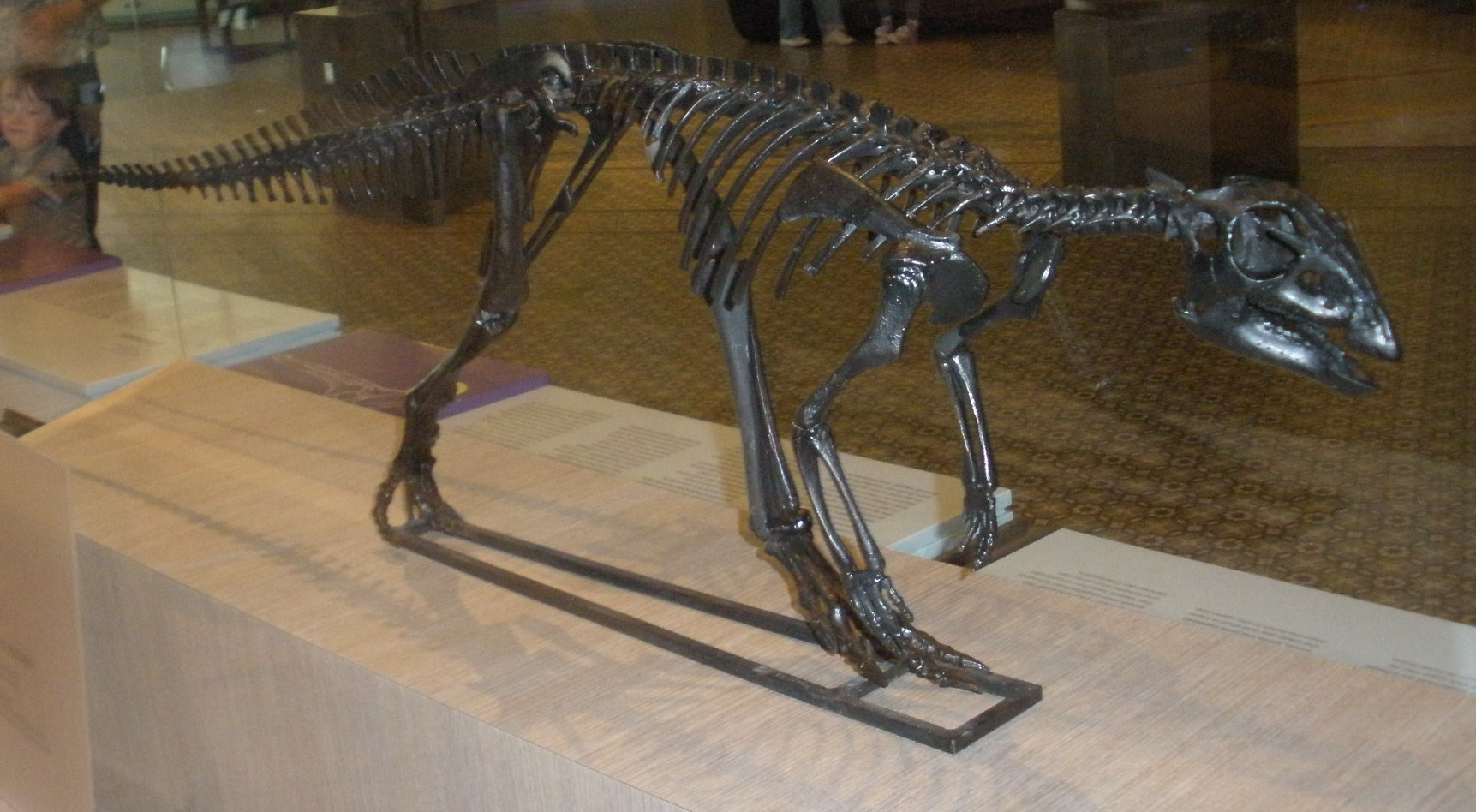
Skeleton of Hypsilophodon

- Huinculsaurus
- Hulsanpes
- Hungarosaurus
- Huxleysaurus – junior synonym of Hypselospinus
- Hylaeosaurus
- Hylosaurus – junior synonym of Hylaeosaurus
- Hypacrosaurus
- Hypnovenator
- Hypselorhachis – subsequently found to be a ctenosauriscid
- Hypselosaurus
- Hypselospinus
- Hypsibema
- Hypsilophodon
- Hypsirhophus – alternate spelling of Hypsirophus
- Hypsirophus

== I ==
Contents:	A B C D E F G H I J K L M N O P Q R S T U V W X Y Z – See also

- Iani
- Iberospinus
- Ibirania
- "Ichabodcraniosaurus" – nomen nudum; Shri
- Ichthyovenator
- Igai
- Ignavusaurus
- Ignotosaurus – possibly non-dinosaurian
- Iguanacolossus
- Iguanodon
- "Iguanoides" – nomen nudum; Iguanodon
- "Iguanosaurus" – nomen nudum; Iguanodon
- "Ikqaumishan" – nomen nudum
- Iliosuchus
- Ilokelesia
- Imperobator
- "Imrankhanhero" – nomen nudum
- "Imrankhanshaheen" – nomen nudum
- Inawentu
- Incisivosaurus
- Indosaurus
- Indosuchus
- Infernogallus
- "Ingenia" – preoccupied name, now known as Heyuannia yanshini
- Ingentia
- Inosaurus
- Invictarx
- Invictibellatrix
- Irisosaurus

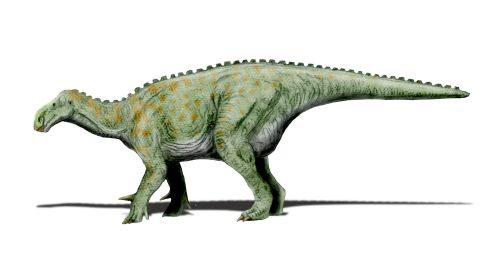
Life reconstruction of Iguanodon

- Irritator
- Isaberrysaura
- Isanosaurus
- Isasicursor
- Ischioceratops
- Ischisaurus – junior synonym of Herrerasaurus
- "Ischyrosaurus" – preoccupied genus name, species Ischyrosaurus manseli
- Isisaurus
- Issi
- Istiorachis
- Itaguyra – possibly non-dinosaurian
- Itapeuasaurus
- Itemirus
- Iuticosaurus
- Iyuku

== J ==
Contents:	A B C D E F G H I J K L M N O P Q R S T U V W X Y Z – See also

- Jaculinykus
- Jainosaurus
- Jakapil
- Jaklapallisaurus
- Janenschia
- Jaxartosaurus
- Jeholosaurus
- "Jeholraptor" – nomen nudum
- Jenghizkhan – junior synonym of Tarbosaurus
- "Jensenosaurus" – nomen nudum; Supersaurus
- Jeyawati
- Jian
- Jianchangosaurus
- "Jiangjunmiaosaurus" – nomen nudum; Monolophosaurus
- Jiangjunosaurus
- Jiangshanosaurus

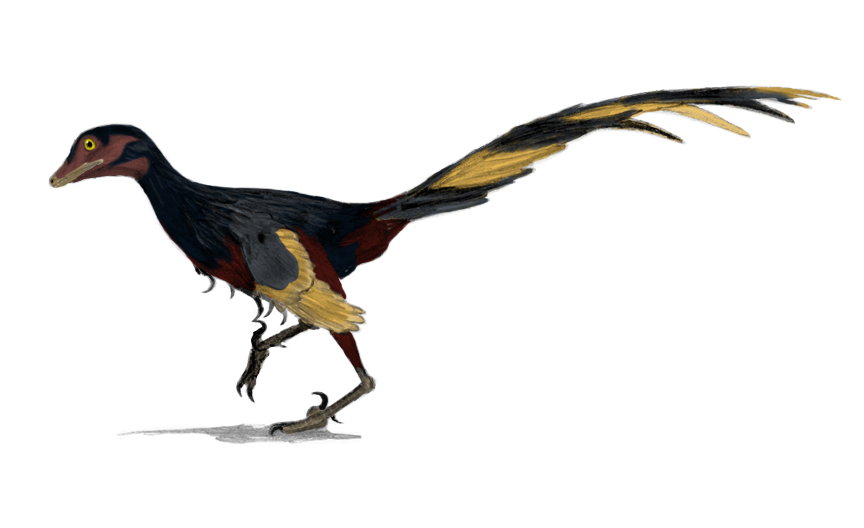
Life restoration of Jinfengopteryx

- Jiangxisaurus
- Jiangxititan
- Jianianhualong
- Jinbeisaurus
- Jinchuanloong
- "Jindipelta" – nomen nudum
- Jinfengopteryx
- "Jingia" – preoccupied name, now known as Jingiella
- Jingiella
- Jingshanosaurus
- Jintasaurus
- Jinyunpelta
- Jinzhousaurus
- Jiutaisaurus
- Joaquinraptor
- Jobaria
- Jubbulpuria – possible junior synonym of Laevisuchus
- Judiceratops
- "Julieraptor" – nomen nudum
- Jurapteryx – junior synonym of Archaeopteryx
- "Jurassosaurus" – nomen nudum; Tianchisaurus
- Juratyrant
- Juravenator

== K ==
Contents:	A B C D E F G H I J K L M N O P Q R S T U V W X Y Z – See also

- Kaatedocus
- "Kagasaurus" – nomen nudum
- Kaijiangosaurus
- Kaijutitan
- Kakuru
- Kamuysaurus
- Kangnasaurus
- Kank
- Kansaignathus
- Karongasaurus
- Katepensaurus
- "Katsuyamasaurus" – nomen nudum
- Kayentavenator
- Kayrasaurus
- Kazaklambia
- Kelmayisaurus
- Kelumapusaura
- Kemkemia – subsequently found to be a crocodyliform
- Kentrosaurus
- Kentrurosaurus – junior synonym (unneeded replacement name) of Kentrosaurus
- Kerberosaurus

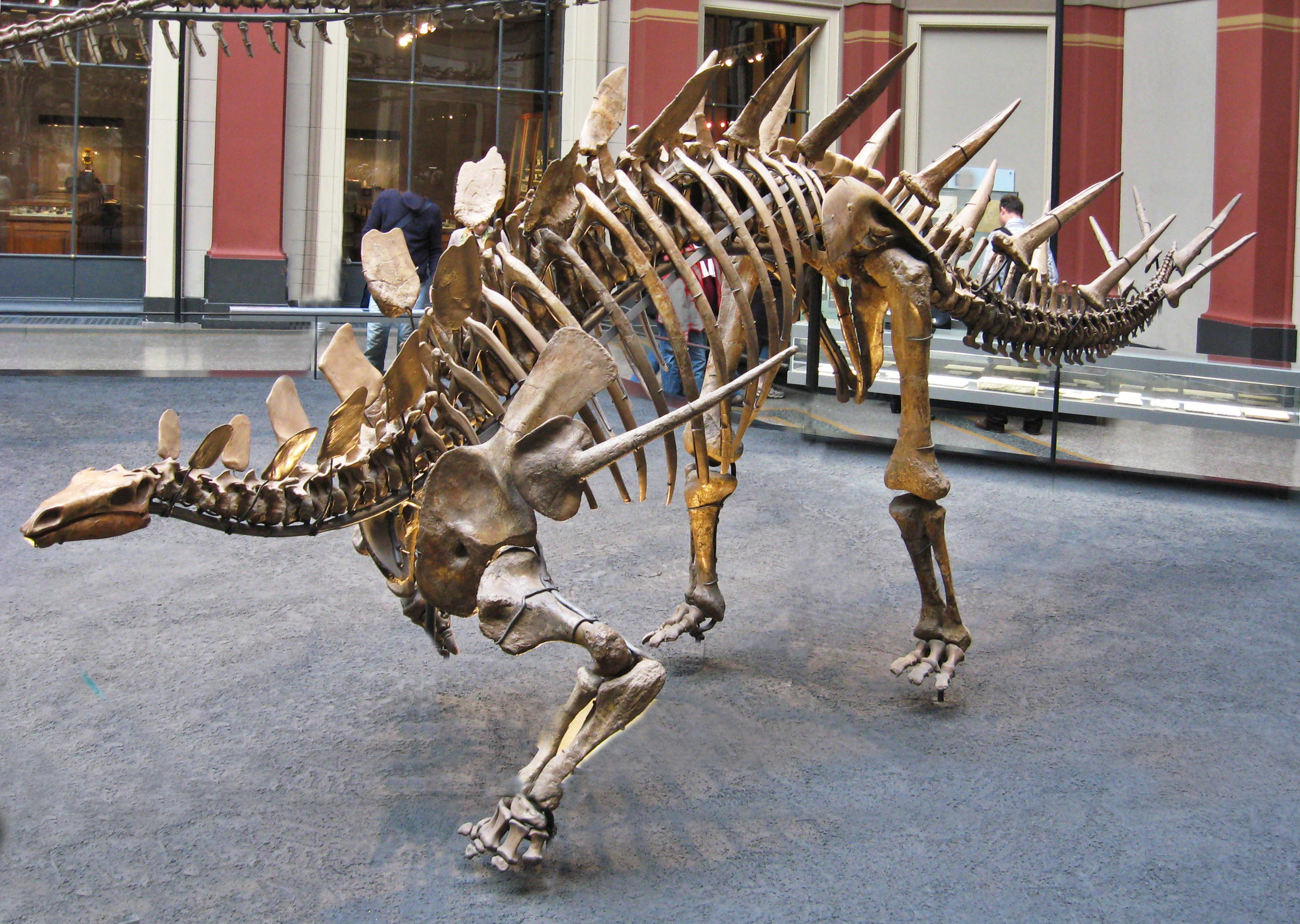
Kentrosaurus skeleton

- Khaan
- Khankhuuluu
- "Khetranisaurus" – nomen nudum
- Kholumolumo
- Khulsanurus
- Kileskus
- Kinnareemimus
- "Kitadanisaurus" – nomen nudum; Fukuiraptor
- "Kittysaurus" – nomen nudum; Eotyrannus
- Kiyacursor
- Klamelisaurus
- Kol
- Koleken
- Koparion
- Koreaceratops
- Koreanosaurus
- "Koreanosaurus" – nomen nudum; name later used formally for a genus of ornithopod
- Koshisaurus
- Kosmoceratops
- Kotasaurus
- Koutalisaurus – possible junior synonym of Pararhabdodon
- Kritosaurus
- Kryptohadros
- Kryptops
- Krzyzanowskisaurus – probably a pseudosuchian (Revueltosaurus?)
- Kukufeldia – junior synonym of Barilium
- Kulceratops
- Kulindadromeus
- Kulindapteryx – synonym of Kulindadromeus
- Kunbarrasaurus
- Kundurosaurus
- "Kunmingosaurus" – nomen nudum
- Kuru
- Kurupi
- Kuszholia – subsequently found to be a bird
- Kwanasaurus – possibly non-dinosaurian
- "Kyacursor" – variant spelling of "Kiyacursor"

== L ==
Contents:	A B C D E F G H I J K L M N O P Q R S T U V W X Y Z – See also

- Labocania
- Labrosaurus – junior synonym of Allosaurus

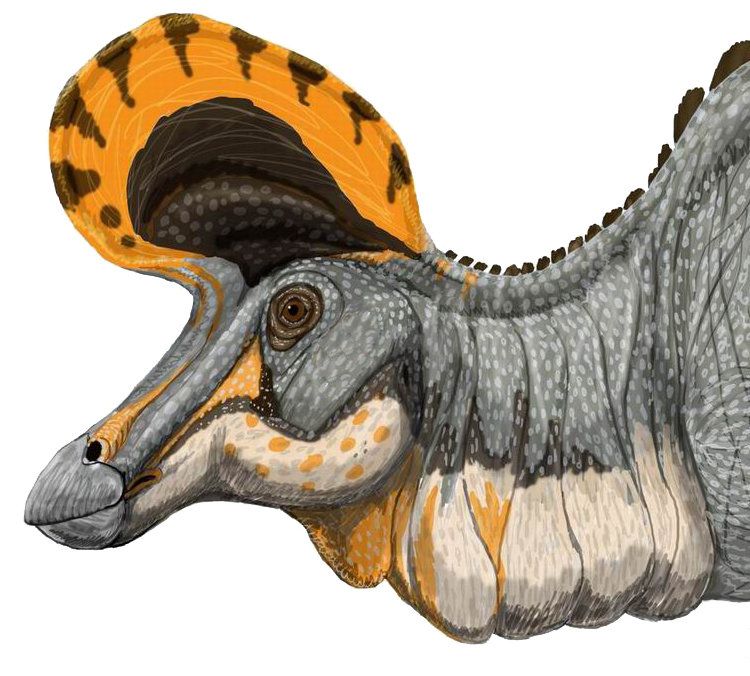
Life restoration of Lambeosaurus

- "Laelaps" – preoccupied name, now known as Dryptosaurus
- Laevisuchus
- Lagerpeton – subsequently found to be a non-dinosaurian pterosauromorph
- Lagosuchus – subsequently found to be a non-dinosaurian dinosauromorph
- Laiyangosaurus
- Lajasvenator
- Lamaceratops – possible junior synonym of Bagaceratops
- Lambeosaurus
- Lametasaurus
- Lamplughsaura
- Lanasaurus – junior synonym of Lycorhinus
- "Lancangosaurus" – variant spelling of "Lancanjiangosaurus"
- "Lancanjiangosaurus" – nomen nudum
- Lanzhousaurus
- Laosaurus
- Lapampasaurus
- Laplatasaurus
- Lapparentosaurus
- Laquintasaura
- Larsonvenator
- Latenivenatrix – possible junior synonym of Stenonychosaurus
- Latirhinus
- Lavocatisaurus
- Leaellynasaura
- Ledumahadi
- Leinkupal
- Leipsanosaurus – junior synonym of Struthiosaurus
- "Lengosaurus" – nomen nudum; Eotyrannus
- Leonerasaurus
- Lepidocheirosaurus — junior synonym of Kulindadromeus
- Lepidus

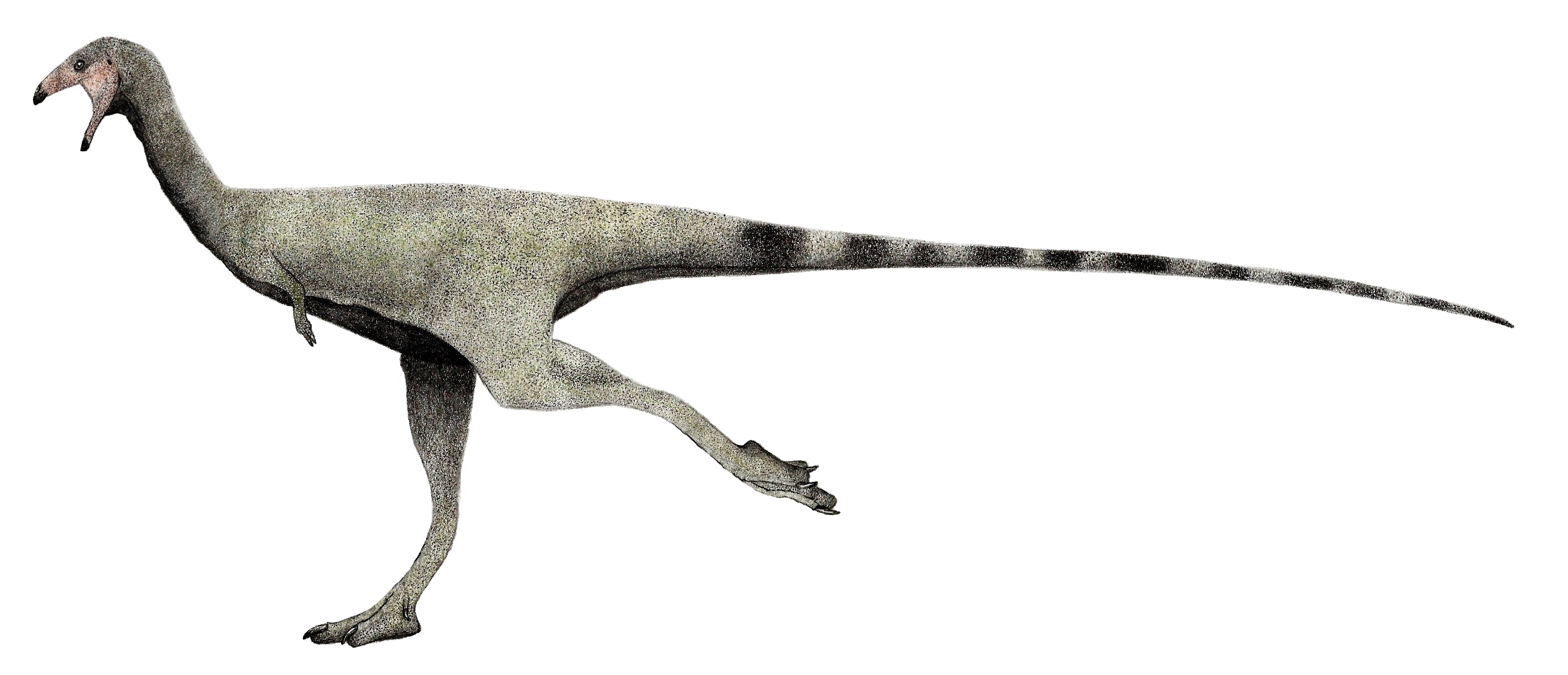
Life restoration of Limusaurus

- Leptoceratops
- Leptorhynchos
- Leptospondylus – junior synonym of Massospondylus
- Leshansaurus
- Lesothosaurus
- Lessemsaurus
- Levnesovia
- Lewisuchus – possibly non-dinosaurian
- Lexovisaurus
- Leyesaurus
- Liaoceratops
- Liaoningosaurus
- Liaoningotitan
- Liaoningvenator
- "Liassaurus" – nomen nudum; possible synonym of Sarcosaurus
- Libycosaurus – subsequently found to be an anthracothere mammal
- Ligabueino
- Ligabuesaurus
- "Likhoelesaurus" – nomen nudum; possibly non-dinosaurian
- Liliensternus
- Limaysaurus
- "Limnornis" – preoccupied name, now known as Palaeocursornis (a pterosaur)
- "Limnosaurus" – preoccupied name, now known as Telmatosaurus
- Limusaurus
- Lingwulong
- Lingyuanosaurus
- Linhenykus
- Linheraptor
- Linhevenator

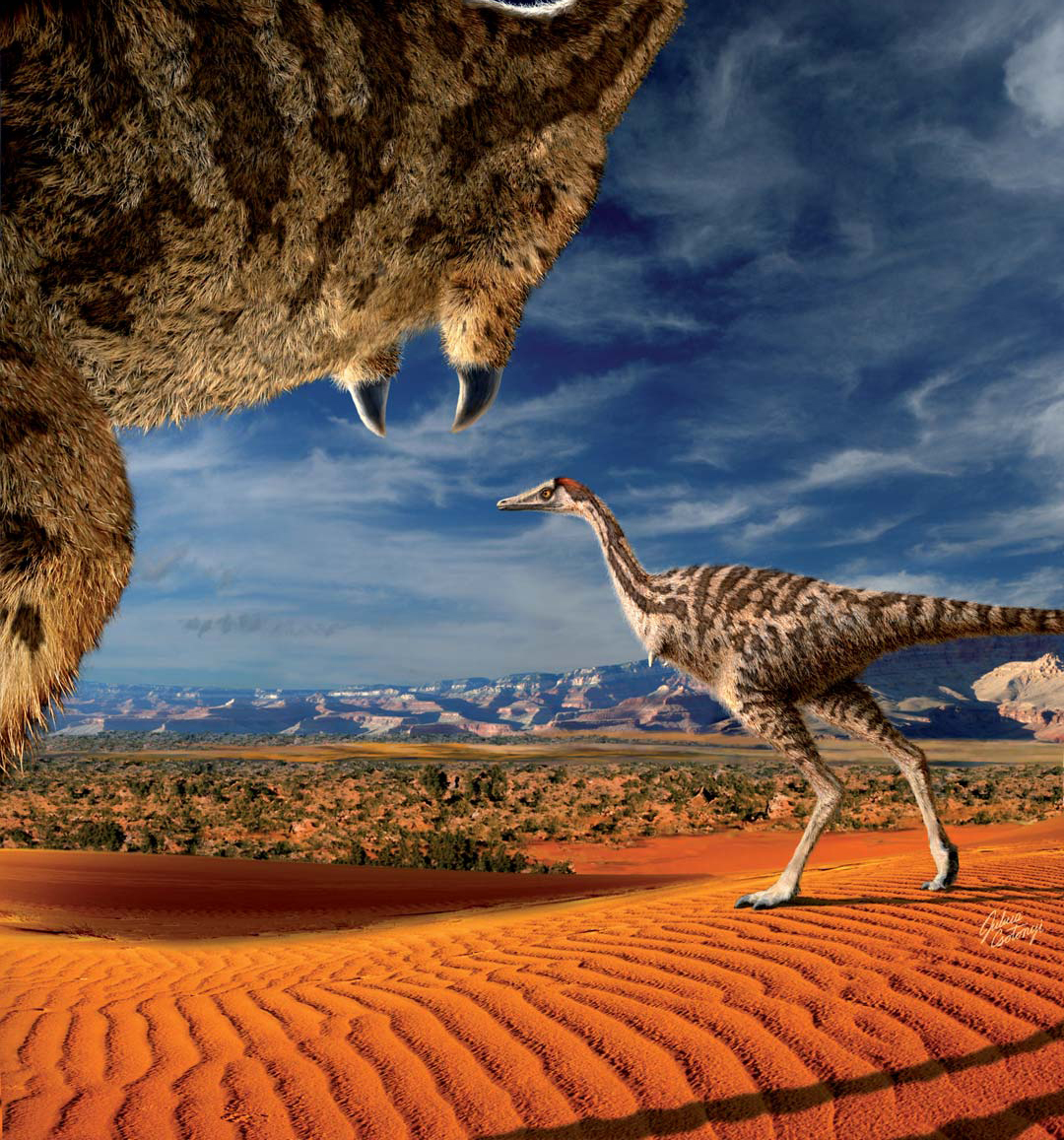
Life reconstruction of two individuals of Linhenykus in their arid Campanian-aged living environment

- Lirainosaurus
- Lisboasaurus – subsequently found to be a crocodilian
- Lishulong
- Liubangosaurus
- Llukalkan
- Lohuecotitan
- Lokiceratops
- Loncosaurus
- Longisquama – subsequently found to be a non-dinosaurian reptile
- Longosaurus – junior synonym of Coelophysis
- "Lopasaurus" – nomen nudum
- Lophorhothon
- Lophostropheus
- Loricatosaurus
- Loricosaurus
- Losillasaurus
- Lourinhanosaurus
- Lourinhasaurus
- Luanchuanraptor
- "Luanpingosaurus" – nomen nudum; Psittacosaurus
- Lucianosaurus – subsequently found to be a non-dinosaurian archosauriform
- Lucianovenator
- Lufengosaurus
- Lukousaurus – possibly a crurotarsan
- Luoyanggia
- Lurdusaurus
- Lusitanosaurus – possibly non-dinosaurian
- Lusotitan
- Lusovenator
- Lutungutali – possibly non-dinosaurian
- Lycorhinus
- Lythronax

== M ==
Contents:	A B C D E F G H I J K L M N O P Q R S T U V W X Y Z – See also

- Macelognathus – subsequently found to be a sphenosuchian crocodilian
- Machairasaurus
- Machairoceratops
- Macrocollum
- Macrodontophion – subsequently found to be a member of Lophotrochozoa
- Macrogryphosaurus
- Macrophalangia – junior synonym of Chirostenotes

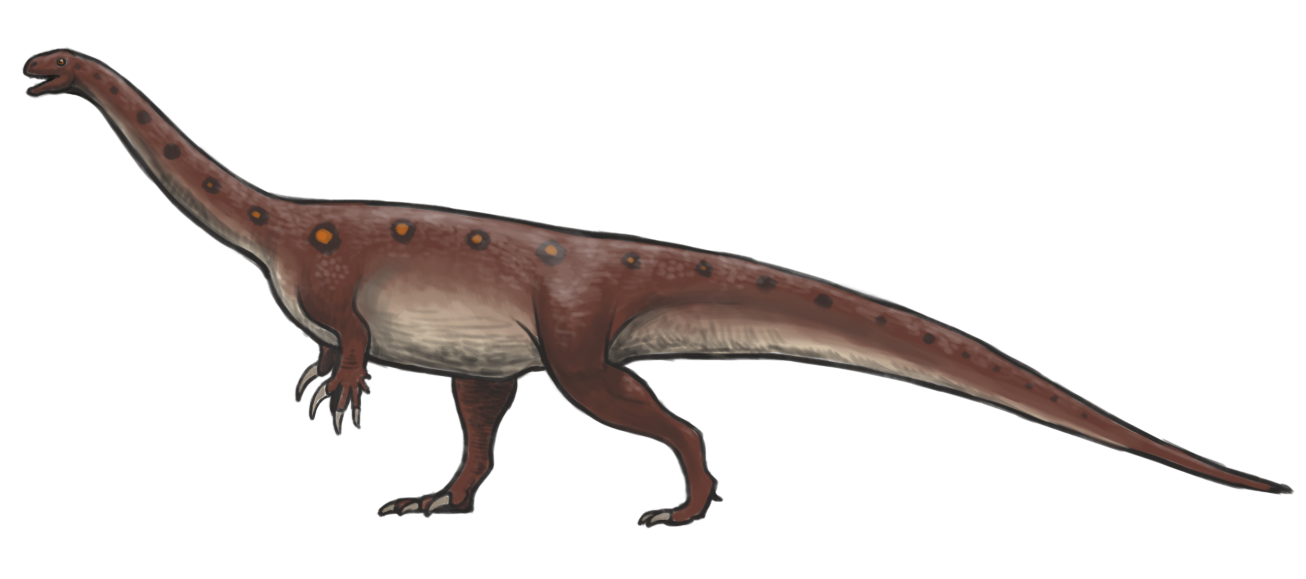
Life reconstruction of Massospondylus

- "Macroscelosaurus" – nomen nudum; junior synonym of Tanystropheus
- Macrurosaurus
- "Madsenius" – nomen nudum; Allosaurus
- Magnamanus
- Magnapaulia
- Magnirostris – possible junior synonym of Bagaceratops
- Magnosaurus
- "Magulodon" – nomen nudum
- Magyarosaurus
- Mahakala
- Mahuidacursor
- Maiasaura
- Maip
- Majungasaurus
- Majungatholus – junior synonym of Majungasaurus
- Malarguesaurus
- Malawisaurus
- Maleevosaurus – junior synonym of Tarbosaurus
- Maleevus
- Malefica
- Maleriraptor
- "Maltaceratops" – nomen nudum
- Mamenchisaurus
- Mandschurosaurus
- Manidens
- Manipulonyx
- Manospondylus – synonym of Tyrannosaurus
- Mansourasaurus
- Mantellisaurus
- Mantellodon – junior synonym of Mantellisaurus
- "Maojandino" – nomen nudum
- Mapusaurus
- Maraapunisaurus
- Marasuchus – subsequently found to be a non-dinosaurian dinosauromorph
- "Marisaurus" – nomen nudum
- Marmarospondylus
- Marshosaurus
- Martharaptor
- Masiakasaurus
- Massospondylus

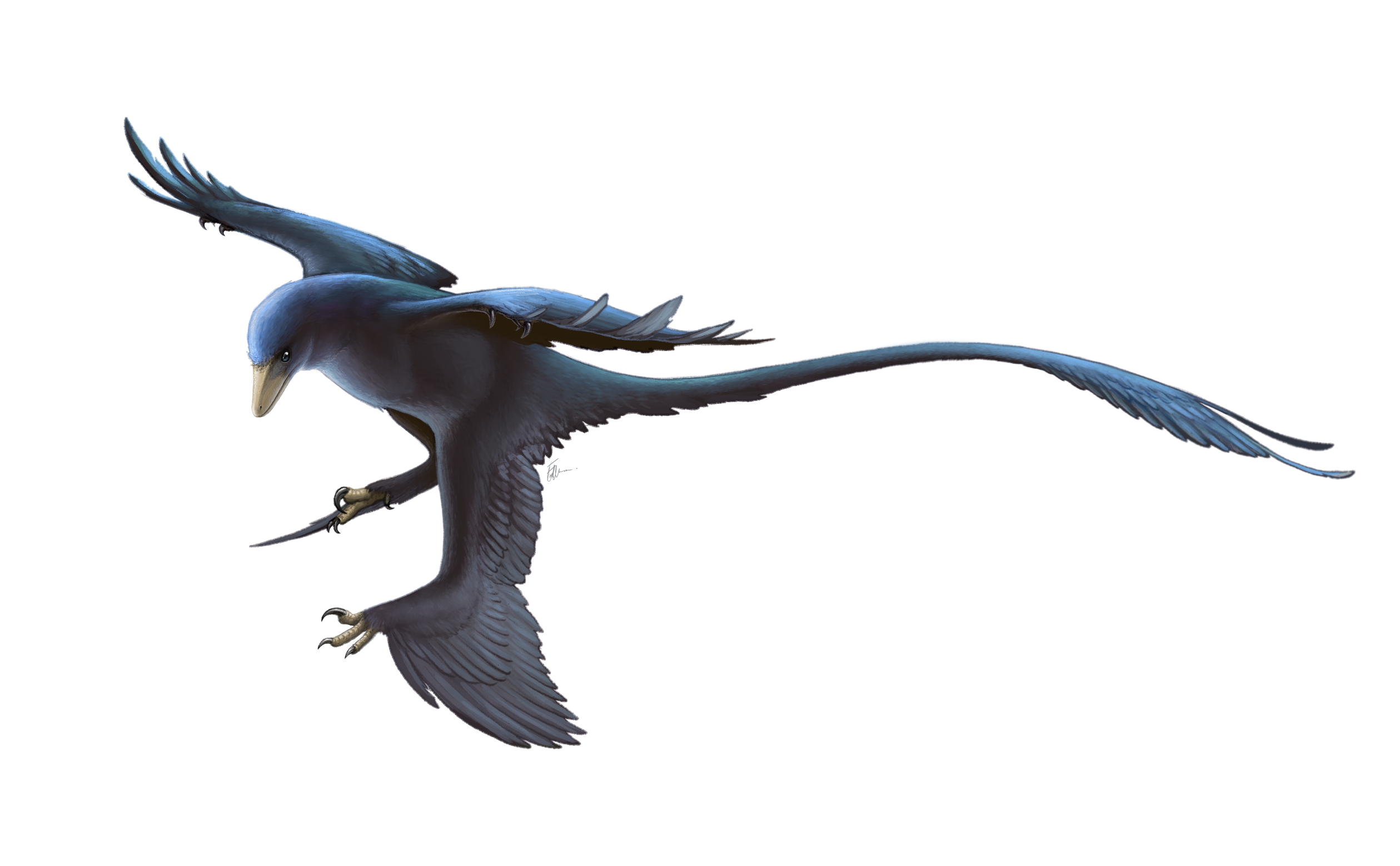
Life reconstruction of Microraptor with colouration based on fossilised melanosomes

- Matheronodon
- Maxakalisaurus
- Mbiresaurus
- Medusaceratops
- "Megacervixosaurus" – nomen nudum
- "Megadactylus" – preoccupied name, now known as Anchisaurus
- "Megadontosaurus" – nomen nudum; Microvenator
- Megalosaurus
- Megapnosaurus – possible junior synonym of Coelophysis
- Megaraptor
- Mei
- Melanorosaurus
- Mendozasaurus
- Menefeeceratops
- Menucocelsior
- Meraxes
- Mercuriceratops
- Meroktenos
- "Merosaurus" – nomen nudum; Dornraptor
- Mesetasaurus
- Metriacanthosaurus
- Mexidracon
- "Microcephale" – nomen nudum
- "Microceratops" – preoccupied name, now known as Microceratus
- Microceratus
- Microcoelus
- "Microdontosaurus" – nomen nudum
- Microhadrosaurus
- Micropachycephalosaurus
- Microraptor
- Microvenator
- Mierasaurus
- "Mifunesaurus" – nomen nudum
- Migmanychion
- Minimocursor
- Minmi
- Minotaurasaurus
- Minqaria
- Miragaia
- Mirischia
- Mnyamawamtuka
- Moabosaurus
- Mochlodon
- "Mohammadisaurus" – nomen nudum; Tornieria

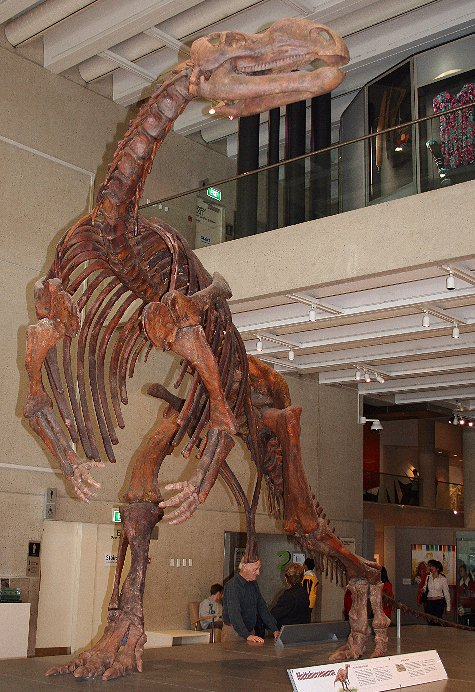
Cast of a Muttaburrasaurus skeleton

- Mojoceratops – junior synonym of Chasmosaurus
- Mongolosaurus
- Mongolostegus
- Monkonosaurus
- Monoclonius
- Monolophosaurus
- "Mononychus" – preoccupied name, now known as Mononykus
- Mononykus
- Montanoceratops
- Morelladon
- Morinosaurus
- Moros
- Morosaurus – junior synonym of Camarasaurus
- Morrosaurus
- Mosaiceratops
- "Moshisaurus" – nomen nudum; possibly Mamenchisaurus
- Murusraptor
- Musango
- Musankwa
- Mussaurus
- Muttaburrasaurus
- Muyelensaurus
- Mymoorapelta

== N ==
Contents:	A B C D E F G H I J K L M N O P Q R S T U V W X Y Z – See also

- Naashoibitosaurus
- Nagatitan
- Nambalia
- Nankangia
- Nanningosaurus
- Nanosaurus
- Nanotyrannus
- Nanshiungosaurus
- Nanuqsaurus
- Nanyangosaurus
- Napaisaurus
- Narambuenatitan
- Narindasaurus
- Nasutoceratops
- Natovenator
- "Natronasaurus" – invalid name, either Alcovasaurus or Miragaia

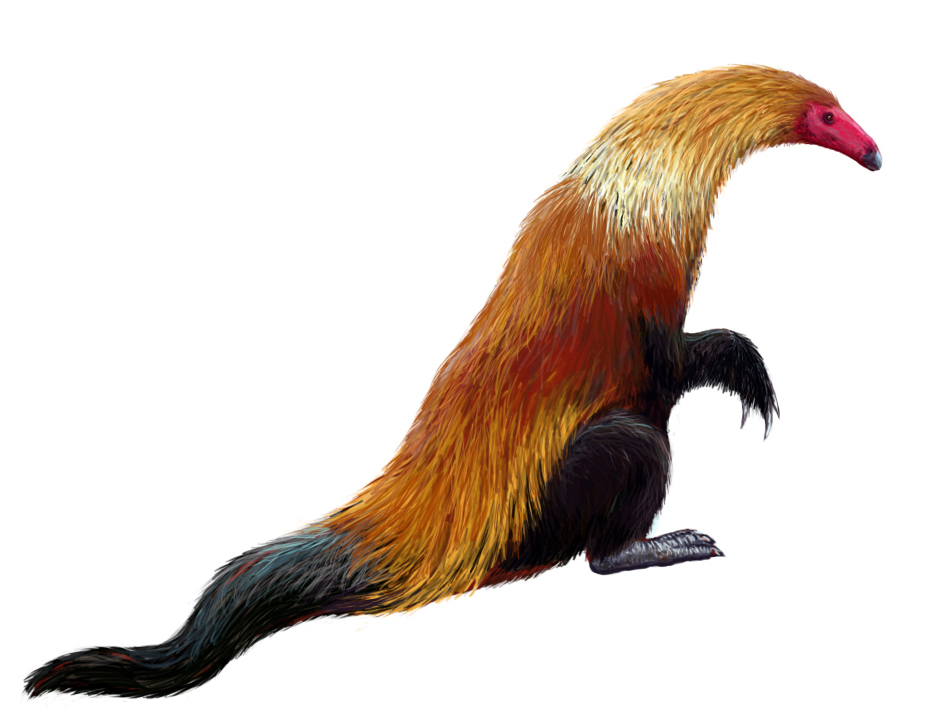
Life restoration of Neimongosaurus

- Navajoceratops
- Nebulasaurus
- "Nectosaurus" – preoccupied name, now known as Kritosaurus
- Nedcolbertia
- Nedoceratops – possible junior synonym of Triceratops
- Neimongosaurus
- "Nemegtia" – preoccupied name, now known as Nemegtomaia
- Nemegtomaia
- Nemegtonykus
- Nemegtosaurus
- "Neosaurus" – preoccupied name; renamed Parrosaurus, which is now Hypsibema
- Neosodon
- Neovenator
- Neuquenraptor
- Neuquensaurus
- Nevadadromeus
- Newtonsaurus
- "Ngexisaurus" – nomen nudum
- Ngwevu
- Nhandumirim
- Nicksaurus – nomen manuscriptum
- Niebla
- Nigersaurus
- Ningyuansaurus
- Ninjatitan
- Niobrarasaurus
- Nipponopelta
- Nipponosaurus
- Noasaurus
- Nodocephalosaurus
- Nodosaurus
- Nomingia – possible junior synonym of Elmisaurus
- Nopcsaspondylus
- Norellraptor
- Normanniasaurus

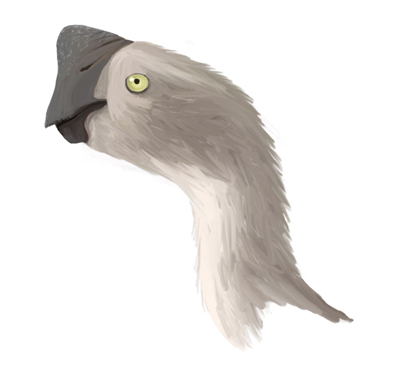
Restored head of Nemegtomaia

- Notatesseraeraptor
- Nothronychus
- Notoceratops
- Notocolossus
- Notohypsilophodon
- Nqwebasaurus
- "Nteregosaurus" – nomen nudum; Janenschia
- Nullotitan
- "Nurosaurus" – nomen nudum
- Nuthetes
- Nyana
- Nyasasaurus — possibly non-dinosaurian

== O ==
Contents:	A B C D E F G H I J K L M N O P Q R S T U V W X Y Z – See also

- Obelignathus
- Oblitosaurus
- Oceanotitan
- Ohmdenosaurus
- Ojoceratops – possible synonym of Eotriceratops
- Ojoraptorsaurus
- Oksoko
- Oligosaurus – possible synonym of Mochlodon
- Olorotitan
- Omeisaurus
- "Omosaurus" – preoccupied name, now known as Dacentrurus
- Ondogurvel
- Onychosaurus – junior synonym of Zalmoxes or Rhabdodon, or an ankylosaurian
- Oohkotokia
- Opisthocoelicaudia
- Oplosaurus
- "Orcomimus" – nomen nudum
- Orinosaurus – junior synonym (unneeded replacement name) of Orosaurus
- Orkoraptor
- Ornatops
- Ornatotholus – junior synonym of Stegoceras
- Ornithodesmus
- "Ornithoides" – nomen nudum; Saurornithoides
- Ornitholestes
- Ornithomerus – possible synonym of Mochlodon
- Ornithomimoides
- Ornithomimus
- Ornithopsis

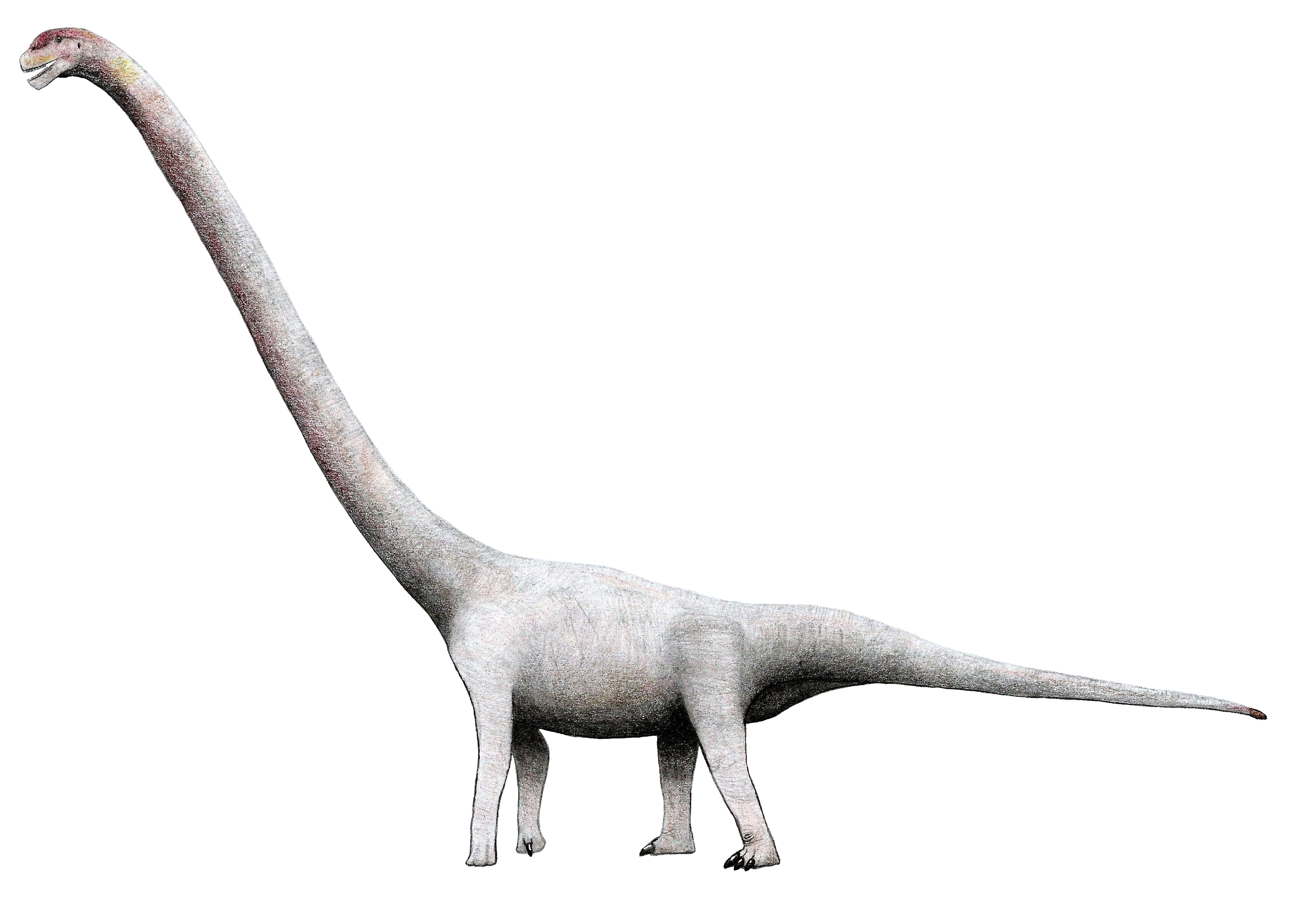
Life reconstruction of Omeisaurus

- Ornithosuchus – subsequently found to be a non-dinosaurian archosaur
- Ornithotarsus – junior synonym of Hadrosaurus
- Orodromeus
- Orosaurus
- Orthogoniosaurus
- Orthomerus
- Oryctodromeus
- "Oshanosaurus" – nomen nudum
- Osmakasaurus
- Ostafrikasaurus
- Ostromia
- Othnielia – possible junior synonym of Nanosaurus
- Othnielosaurus – possible junior synonym of Nanosaurus
- Otogosaurus — possibly a nomen nudum
- Ouranosaurus
- Overoraptor
- Overosaurus
- Oviraptor
- "Ovoraptor" – nomen nudum; Velociraptor
- Owenodon
- Oxalaia – possible junior synonym of Spinosaurus
- Ozraptor

== P ==
Contents:	A B C D E F G H I J K L M N O P Q R S T U V W X Y Z – See also

- Pachycephalosaurus
- Pachyrhinosaurus
- Pachysauriscus – possible junior synonym of Plateosaurus
- Pachysaurops – junior synonym of Pachysauriscus; possible junior synonym of Plateosaurus
- "Pachysaurus" – preoccupied name, now known as Pachysauriscus; possible junior synonym of Plateosaurus
- Pachyspondylus – junior synonym of Massospondylus
- Pachysuchus
- Padillasaurus
- "Pakisaurus" – nomen nudum
- Palaeoctonus – subsequently found to be a phytosaur
- Palaeocursornis – subsequently found to be an azhdarchoid pterosaur
- "Palaeolimnornis" – nomen nudum; Palaeocursornis, pterodactyloid pterosaur belonging to Azhdarchoidea
- Palaeopteryx – possibly a bird
- Palaeosauriscus – junior synonym of Palaeosaurus
- Palaeosaurus – subsequently found to be a non-dinosaurian reptile
- "Palaeosaurus" – preoccupied name, now known as Sphenosaurus and considered to be a non-dinosaurian procolophonid
- Palaeoscincus
- Paleosaurus – subsequently found to be a non-dinosaurian archosaur; junior synonym (unneeded replacement name) of Palaeosaurus
- Paludititan
- Paludohadros
- Paluxysaurus – junior synonym of Sauroposeidon
- Pampadromaeus

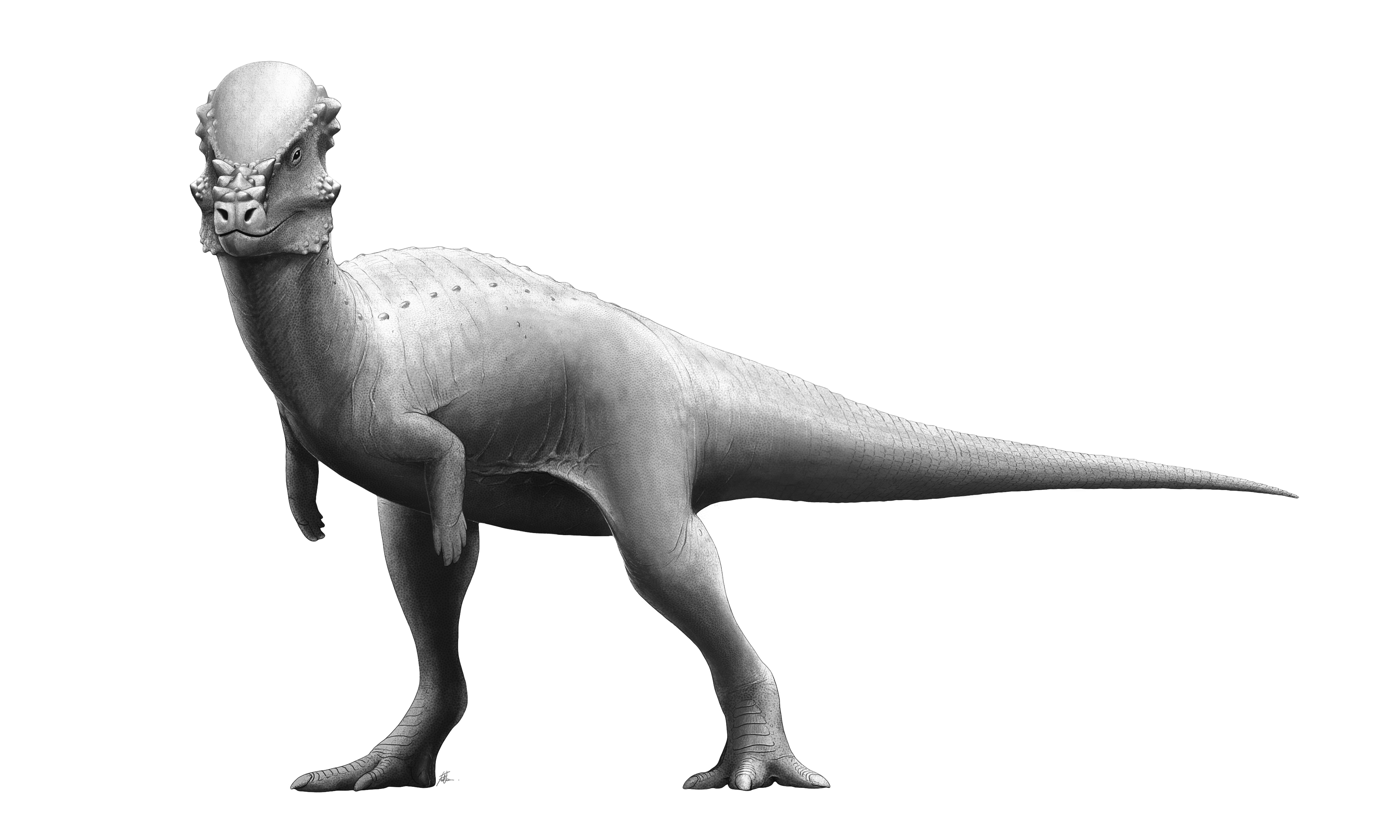
Life restoration of Pachycephalosaurus

- Pamparaptor
- Panamericansaurus
- Pandoravenator
- Panguraptor
- Panoplosaurus
- Panphagia
- Pantydraco – possible synonym of Thecodontosaurus
- Papiliovenator
- "Paraiguanodon" – nomen nudum; Bactrosaurus
- Paralitherizinosaurus
- Paralititan
- Paranthodon
- Pararhabdodon
- Parasaurolophus
- Paraxenisaurus
- Pareiasaurus – subsequently found to be a pareiasaur
- Pareisactus
- Parksosaurus
- Paronychodon
- Parrosaurus – now known as Hypsibema missouriensis
- Parvicursor
- Patagonykus
- Patagopelta
- Patagosaurus
- Patagotitan
- Paulodon
- Pawpawsaurus
- Pectinodon
- Pedopenna
- Pegomastax
- Peishansaurus
- Pekinosaurus – subsequently found to be a pseudosuchian; junior synonym of Revueltosaurus
- Pelecanimimus
- Pellegrinisaurus
- Peloroplites
- Pelorosaurus
- "Peltosaurus" – preoccupied name, now known as Sauropelta
- Pendraig
- Penelopognathus
- Pentaceratops

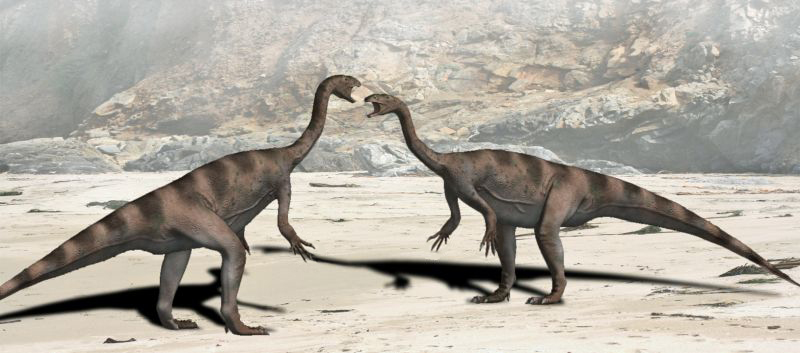
Life restoration of Plateosaurus

- Perijasaurus
- Petrobrasaurus
- Petrustitan
- Phaedrolosaurus
- Philovenator
- Phosphatotitan
- Phuwiangosaurus
- Phuwiangvenator
- Phyllodon
- Piatnitzkysaurus
- Picrodon – possibly non-dinosaurian
- Pilmatueia
- Pinacosaurus
- Pisanosaurus — possibly non-dinosaurian
- Pitekunsaurus
- Piveteausaurus
- Planicoxa
- Plateosauravus
- Plateosaurus
- Platyceratops – possible junior synonym of Bagaceratops
- Platypelta
- Platytholus
- Plesiohadros
- Plesiolophus
- Pleurocoelus – possible junior synonym of Astrodon
- Pleuropeltus – junior synonym of Struthiosaurus
- Pneumatoarthrus – subsequently found to be a turtle
- Pneumatoraptor
- "Podischion" – nomen nudum; Hypacrosaurus
- Podokesaurus
- Poekilopleuron
- Polacanthoides – chimera of Hylaeosaurus and Polacanthus
- Polacanthus
- Polyodontosaurus
- Polyonax
- Ponerosteus – subsequently found to be a non-dinosaurian archosaur
- Poposaurus – subsequently found to be a non-dinosaurian archosaur
- Portellsaurus
- Postosuchus – subsequently found to be a rauisuchian
- Powellvenator
- Pradhania
- Prenocephale
- Prenoceratops
- Priconodon
- Priodontognathus

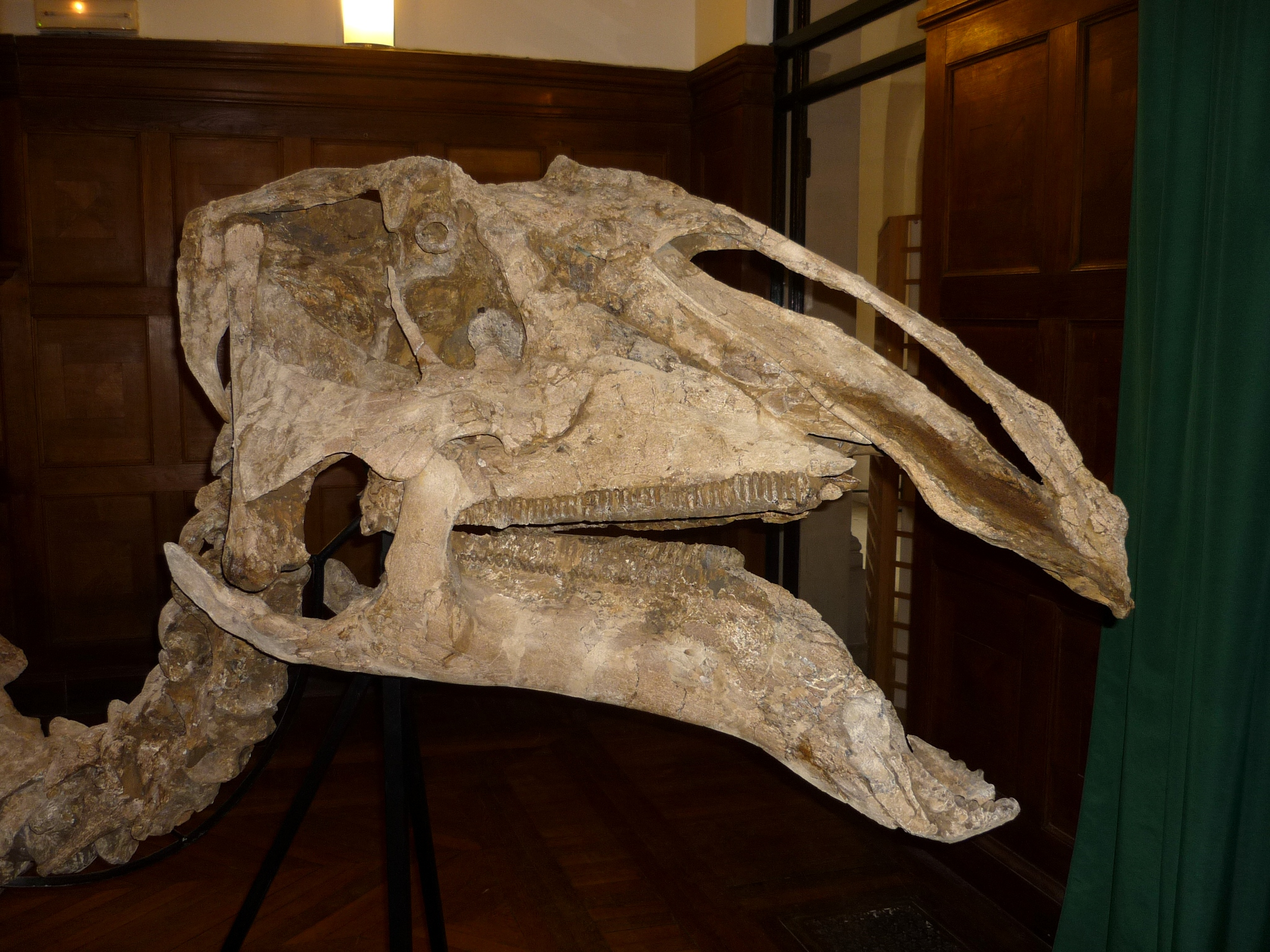
Prosaurolophus skull

- Proa
- Probactrosaurus
- Probrachylophosaurus
- Proceratops – junior synonym (unneeded replacement name) of Ceratops
- Proceratosaurus
- Procerosaurus – subsequently found to be a tanystropheid protorosaur, Tanystropheus
- "Procerosaurus" – preoccupied name, now known as Ponerosteus
- Procheneosaurus – junior synonym of Lambeosaurus
- Procompsognathus
- Prodeinodon
- "Proiguanodon" – nomen nudum; Iguanodon
- Propanoplosaurus
- Proplanicoxa – junior synonym of Mantellisaurus
- Prosaurolophus
- Protarchaeopteryx
- Protathlitis
- Protecovasaurus – subsequently found to be a non-dinosaurian archosauriform
- Protiguanodon – junior synonym of Psittacosaurus
- Protoavis – described as a bird, probably a chimera including theropod dinosaur bones
- Protoceratops
- Protognathosaurus
- "Protognathus" – preoccupied name, now known as Protognathosaurus
- Protohadros
- "Protorosaurus" – preoccupied name, now known as Chasmosaurus
- Protorosaurus – subsequently found to be a non-dinosaurian reptile
- "Proyandusaurus" – nomen nudum; Hexinlusaurus.
- Pseudolagosuchus – possibly non-dinosaurian; a junior synonym of Lewisuchus
- Psittacosaurus
- Pteropelyx
- Pterospondylus
- Ptychotherates
- Puertasaurus
- Pukyongosaurus
- Pulanesaura
- Pulaosaurus
- Punatitan
- Pycnonemosaurus
- Pyroraptor

== Q ==
Contents:	A B C D E F G H I J K L M N O P Q R S T U V W X Y Z – See also

- "Qaikshaheen" – nomen nudum
- Qantassaurus
- Qianjiangsaurus
- Qianlong

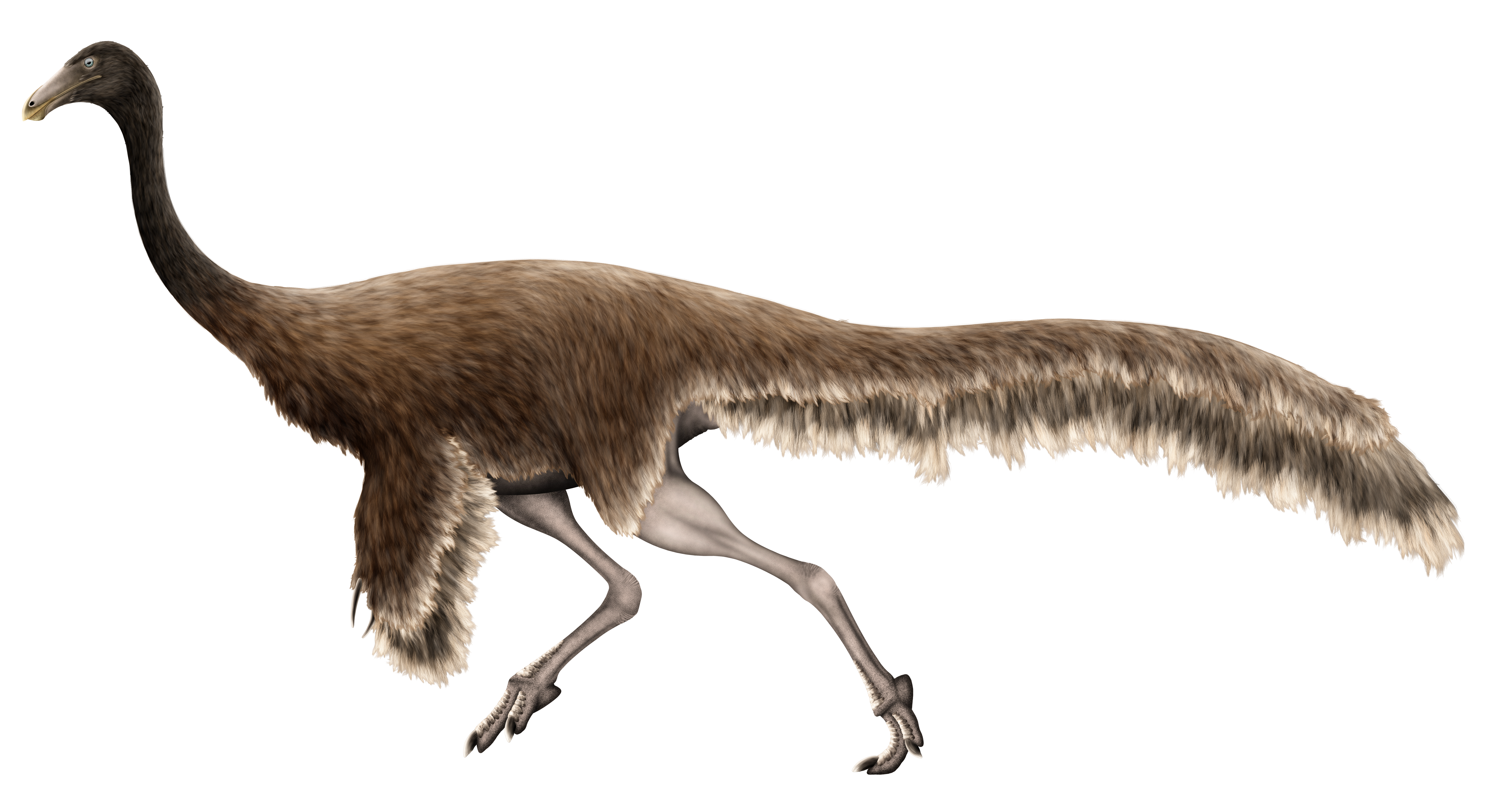
Life reconstruction of Qiupalong

- Qianzhousaurus
- Qiaowanlong
- Qijianglong
- Qingxiusaurus
- Qinlingosaurus
- Qiupalong
- Qiupanykus
- Quaesitosaurus
- Quetecsaurus
- Quilmesaurus
- Qunkasaura

== R ==
Contents:	A B C D E F G H I J K L M N O P Q R S T U V W X Y Z – See also

- Rachitrema – subsequently found to be a chimera primarily based on ichthyosaur fossils
- Rahiolisaurus
- "Rahona" – preoccupied name, now known as Rahonavis
- Rahonavis – possibly a bird
- Rajasaurus
- Rapator
- Rapetosaurus
- Raptorex – possible junior synonym of Tarbosaurus
- Ratchasimasaurus
- Rativates
- Rayososaurus
- Razanandrongobe – subsequently found to be a crocodylomorph
- Rebbachisaurus
- Regaliceratops
- Regnosaurus
- Revueltosaurus – subsequently found to be a pseudosuchian
- Rewasaurus – possibly non-dinosaurian
- Rhabdodon
- Rhadinosaurus – may be non-dinosaurian, possibly crocodilian
- Rhinorex – possible synonym of Gryposaurus
- Rhodanosaurus – junior synonym of Struthiosaurus
- Rhoetosaurus
- Rhomaleopakhus
- Rhopalodon – subsequently found to be a synapsid
- Riabininohadros
- Richardoestesia

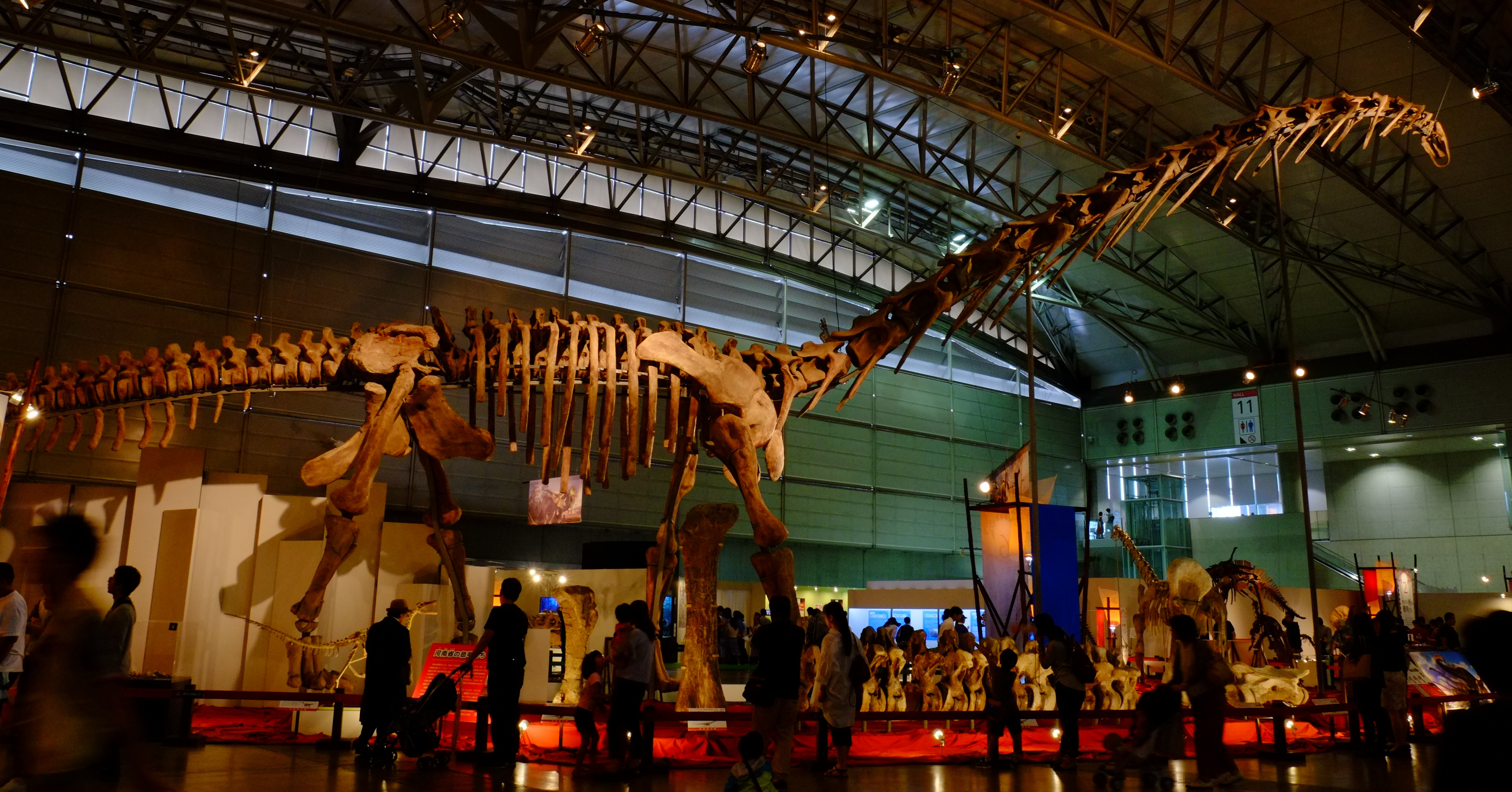
Ruyangosaurus skeleton

- "Rileya" – preoccupied name, now known as Rileyasuchus
- Rileyasuchus – subsequently found to be a phytosaur
- Rinchenia
- Rinconraptor
- Rinconsaurus
- Rioarribasaurus – junior synonym of Coelophysis
- "Riodevasaurus" – nomen nudum; Turiasaurus
- Riojasaurus
- Riojasuchus – subsequently found to be a non-dinosaurian archosaur
- Riojavenatrix
- Riparovenator
- Rocasaurus
- "Roccosaurus" – nomen nudum; Melanorosaurus
- "Ronaldoraptor" – nomen nudum
- Rubeosaurus – junior synonym of Styracosaurus
- Ruehleia
- Rugocaudia
- Rugops
- Ruixinia
- Rukwatitan
- "Rutellum" – nomen oblitum
- Ruyangosaurus

== S ==
Contents:	A B C D E F G H I J K L M N O P Q R S T U V W X Y Z – See also

- "Sabinosaurus" – nomen nudum
- Sacisaurus – possibly non-dinosaurian
- Sahaliyania – possible junior synonym of Amurosaurus
- Saichania
- "Saldamosaurus" – nomen nudum
- Saltasaurus
- "Saltillomimus" – nomen nudum
- Saltopus – possibly non-dinosaurian
- "Saltriosaurus" – nomen nudum; Saltriovenator
- Saltriovenator
- "Sanchusaurus" – nomen nudum; possible Gallimimus
- "Sangonghesaurus" – nomen nudum; Tianchisaurus
- Sanjuansaurus
- Sanpasaurus
- Santanaraptor
- Sanxiasaurus
- Sarahsaurus
- Saraikimasoom – nomen manuscriptum
- "Saraikisaurus" – nomen nudum
- Sarcolestes
- Sarcosaurus
- Sarmientosaurus
- Sasayamagnomus
- Saturnalia
- "Sauraechinodon" – nomen nudum; Echinodon

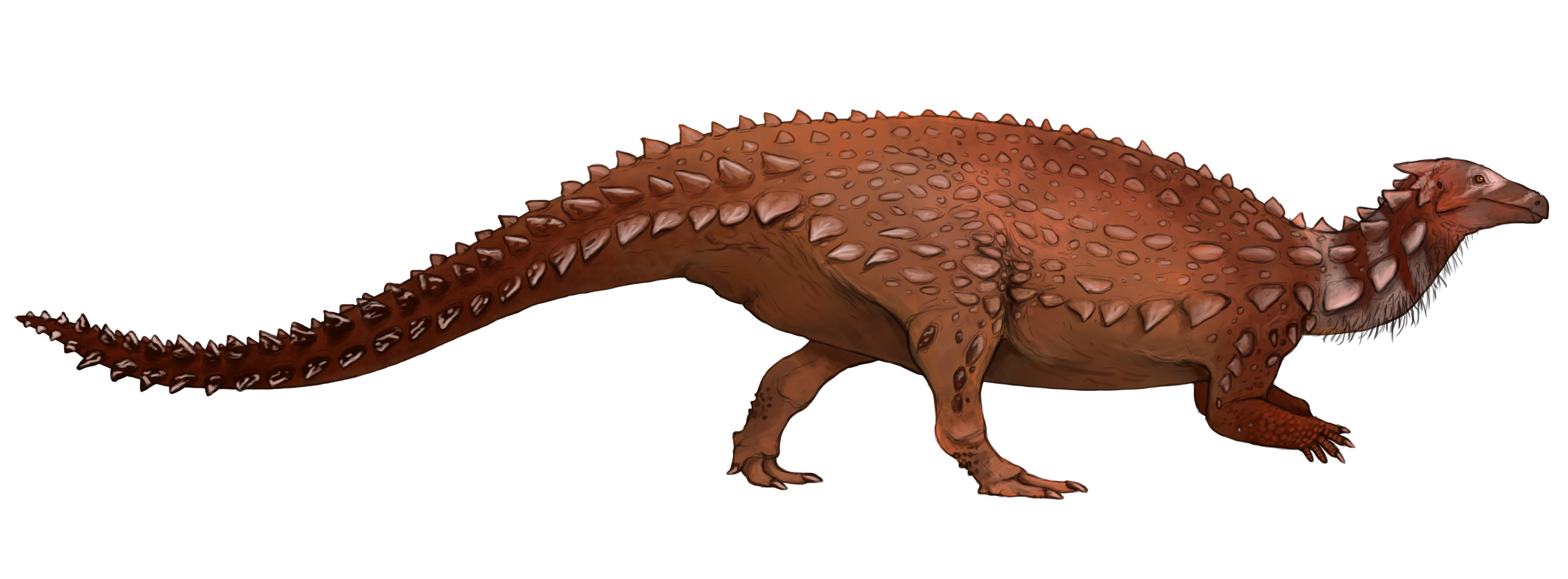
Life restoration of Scelidosaurus

- "Sauraechmodon" – nomen nudum; Echinodon
- "Saurechinodon" – nomen nudum; Echinodon
- Saurolophus
- Sauroniops
- Sauropelta
- Saurophaganax
- "Saurophagus" – preoccupied name, now known as Saurophaganax
- Sauroplites
- "Sauropodus" – nomen nudum; Bustingorrytitan
- Sauroposeidon
- Saurornithoides
- Saurornitholestes
- Savannasaurus
- Scansoriopteryx
- Scaphonyx – subsequently found to be a rhynchosaur, Hyperodapedon
- Scelidosaurus
- Schleitheimia
- Scipionyx
- Sciurumimus
- Scleromochlus – subsequently found to be a non-dinosaurian avemetatarsalian
- Scolosaurus
- Scutellosaurus
- Secernosaurus
- Sefapanosaurus
- Segisaurus
- Segnosaurus
- Seismosaurus – junior synonym of Diplodocus
- Seitaad
- Sektensaurus
- Sellacoxa – junior synonym of Barilium
- Sellosaurus – junior synonym of Plateosaurus
- Serendipaceratops
- Serikornis
- Shamosaurus
- Shanag
- Shanshanosaurus – junior synonym of Tarbosaurus
- Shantungosaurus
- Shanxia
- Shanyangosaurus
- Shaochilong

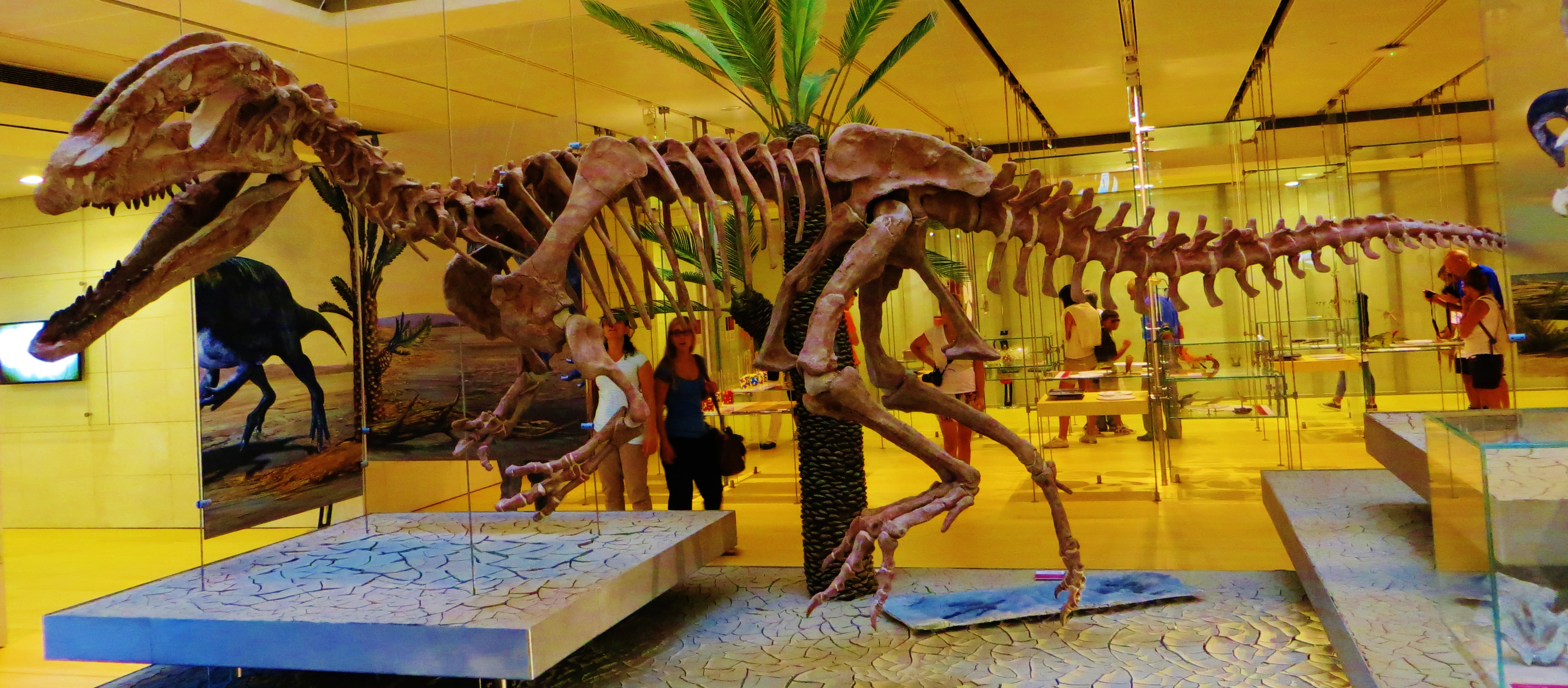
Sinosaurus skeleton, Museo delle Scienze of Trento, Italy

- Shenzhousaurus
- Shidaisaurus
- Shingopana
- Shishugounykus
- Shixinggia
- Shri
- Shuangbaisaurus – possible synonym of Sinosaurus
- Shuangmiaosaurus
- Shunosaurus
- Shuvosaurus – subsequently found to be a rauisuchian
- Shuvuuia
- Siamodon
- "Siamodracon" – nomen nudum
- Siamosaurus
- Siamotyrannus
- Siamraptor
- Siats
- "Sibirosaurus" – nomen nudum; Sibirotitan
- Sibirotitan
- Sidersaura
- "Sidormimus" – nomen nudum
- Sierraceratops
- Sigilmassasaurus – possible junior synonym of Spinosaurus
- Silesaurus – possibly non-dinosaurian
- Siluosaurus
- Silutitan
- Silvisaurus
- Similicaudipteryx
- Sinankylosaurus
- Sinocalliopteryx
- Sinocephale
- Sinoceratops
- Sinocoelurus
- "Sinopelta" – nomen nudum; synonym of Sinopeltosaurus
- "Sinopeltosaurus" – nomen nudum
- Sinopliosaurus – a pliosaur; one species, "S." fusuiensis, is actually a dinosaur that may be synonymous with Siamosaurus
- Sinornithoides

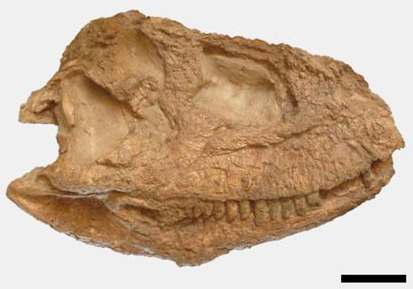
Skorpiovenator skull

- Sinornithomimus
- Sinornithosaurus
- Sinosauropteryx
- Sinosaurus
- Sinotyrannus
- Sinovenator
- Sinraptor
- Sinusonasus
- Sirindhorna
- "Skaladromeus" – nomen nudum
- Skorpiovenator
- "Smilodon" – preoccupied name, now known as Zanclodon
- Smitanosaurus
- Smok — possibly non-dinosaurian
- Sonidosaurus
- Sonorasaurus
- Soriatitan
- Soumyasaurus – possibly non-dinosaurian
- Spectrovenator
- Sphaerotholus
- Sphenosaurus – subsequently found to be a non-dinosaurian reptile
- Sphenospondylus – junior synonym of Mantellisaurus
- Spiclypeus
- Spicomellus
- Spinophorosaurus
- Spinops
- Spinosaurus
- Spinostropheus
- Spinosuchus – subsequently found to be a non-dinosaurian reptile
- Spondylosoma – subsequently found to be an aphanosaur
- Squalodon – subsequently found to be a cetacean
- Staurikosaurus
- Stegoceras
- Stegopelta
- Stegosaurides
- Stegosaurus
- "Stegotitanus" – nomen nudum; informal replacement of Stegosaurus
- Stegouros
- Stellasaurus
- Stenonychosaurus

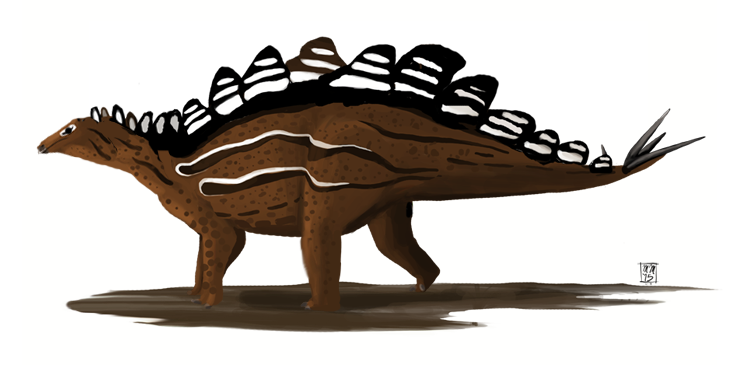
Life restoration of Stegosaurus

- Stenopelix
- Stenotholus – junior synonym of Stygimoloch, which is a possible junior synonym of Pachycephalosaurus
- Stephanosaurus
- "Stereocephalus" – preoccupied name, now known as Euoplocephalus
- Sterrholophus – junior synonym of Triceratops
- Stokesosaurus
- Stormbergia – junior synonym of Lesothosaurus
- Strenusaurus – junior synonym of Riojasaurus
- Streptospondylus
- Struthiomimus
- Struthiosaurus
- Stygimoloch – possible junior synonym of Pachycephalosaurus
- Stygivenator – possible junior synonym of Tyrannosaurus
- Styracosaurus
- Succinodon – subsequently found to be fossilized mollusc borings
- Suchomimus
- Suchoprion – subsequently found to be a phytosaur
- Suchosaurus – possible synonym of Baryonyx
- "Suciasaurus" – nomen nudum
- "Sugiyamasaurus" – nomen nudum
- "Sulaimanisaurus" – nomen nudum
- Supersaurus
- Suskityrannus
- Suuwassea
- Suzhousaurus
- Symphyrophus – junior synonym of Camptosaurus
- Syngonosaurus
- "Syntarsus" – preoccupied name, sometimes assigned to Coelophysis or Megapnosaurus
- Syrmosaurus – junior synonym of Pinacosaurus
- Szechuanosaurus

== T ==
Contents:	A B C D E F G H I J K L M N O P Q R S T U V W X Y Z – See also

- Tachiraptor

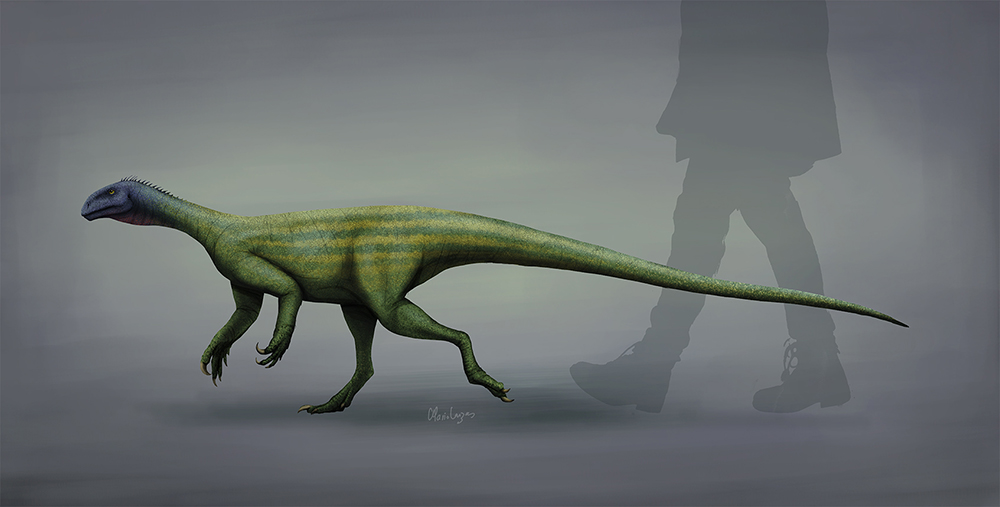
Life restoration of Thecodontosaurus

- Talarurus
- Talenkauen
- Taleta
- Talos
- Tamarro
- Tambatitanis
- Tameryraptor
- Tangvayosaurus
- Tanius
- Tanycolagreus
- Tanystropheus – subsequently found to be a protorosaur
- Tanystrosuchus
- Taohelong
- Tapinocephalus – subsequently found to be a therapsid
- Tapuiasaurus
- Tarascosaurus
- Tarbosaurus
- Tarchia
- Tastavinsaurus
- Tatankacephalus
- Tatankaceratops – probable junior synonym of Triceratops
- Tataouinea
- Tatisaurus
- Taurovenator
- Taveirosaurus – possibly a eutriconodont mammal
- Tawa
- Tawasaurus – junior synonym of Lufengosaurus
- Tazoudasaurus
- Technosaurus – possibly non-dinosaurian
- Tecovasaurus – subsequently found to be a non-dinosaurian archosauriform
- Tehuelchesaurus
- "Teihivenator" – nomen nudum
- Teinurosaurus
- Teleocrater – subsequently found to be a basal avemetatarsalian
- Telmatosaurus
- "Tenantosaurus" – nomen nudum; Tenontosaurus
- "Tenchisaurus" – nomen nudum; an unpublished museum name for Tianchisaurus
- Tendaguria
- Tengrisaurus
- Tenontosaurus
- Teratophoneus
- Teratosaurus – subsequently found to be a non-dinosaurian archosaur
- Termatosaurus – subsequently found to be a phytosaur
- Terminocavus

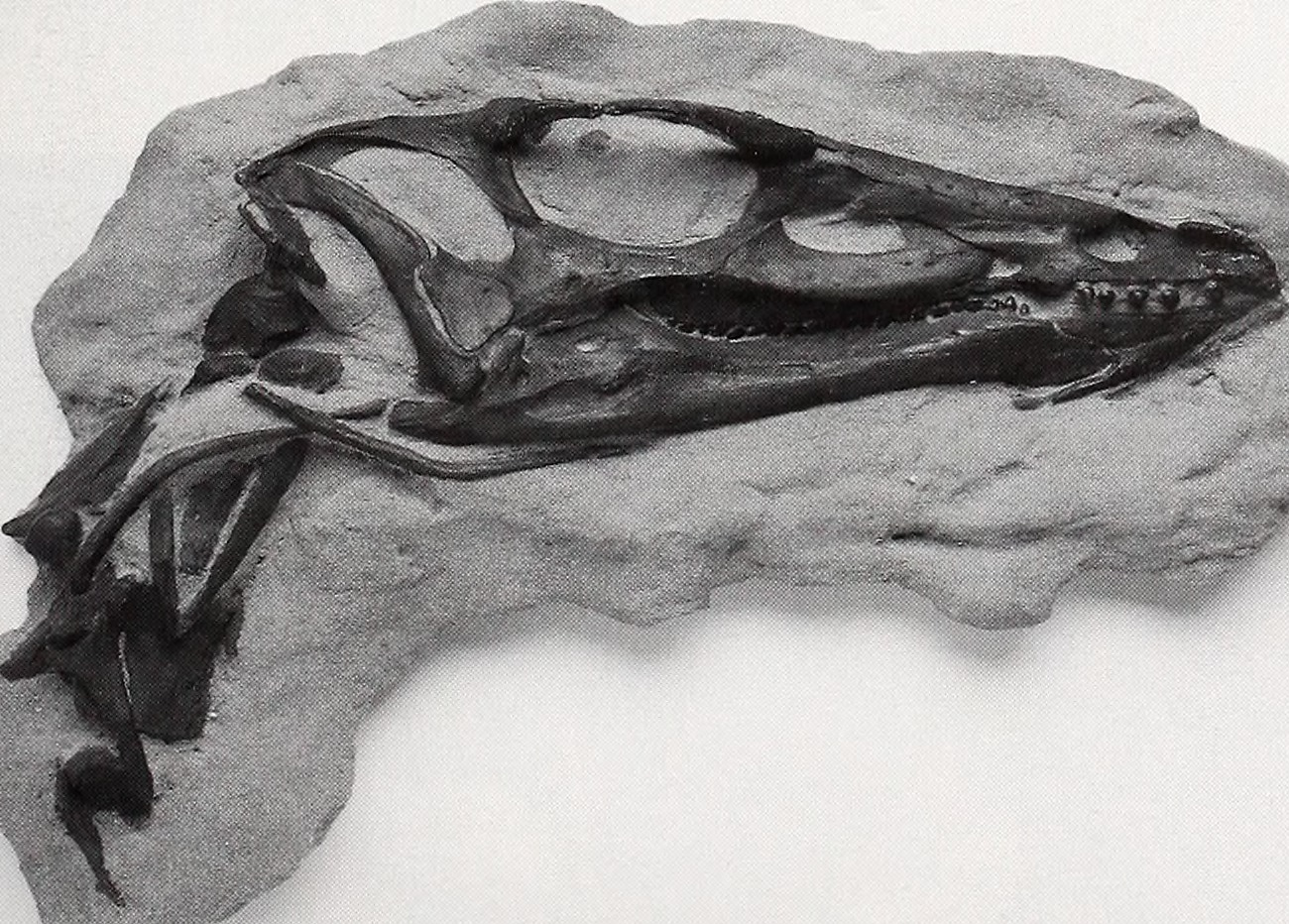
Thescelosaurus fossil

- Tethyshadros
- Tetragonosaurus – junior synonym of Lambeosaurus
- Texacephale
- Texasetes
- Teyuwasu – possible junior synonym of Staurikosaurus
- Thanatotheristes
- Thanos
- Tharosaurus
- Thecocoelurus
- Thecodontosaurus
- Thecospondylus
- Theiophytalia
- Therizinosaurus
- Therosaurus – synonym of Iguanodon
- Thescelosaurus
- Thespesius
- "Thotobolosaurus" – nomen nudum; Kholumolumo
- Thyreosaurus
- Tiamat
- Tianchiasaurus – alternate spelling of Tianchisaurus
- Tianchisaurus
- "Tianchungosaurus" – nomen nudum; Dianchungosaurus, a crocodilian
- Tianyulong
- Tianyuraptor
- Tianzhenosaurus
- Tichosteus
- Tienshanosaurus
- Tietasaura
- Timimus
- Timurlengia
- Titanoceratops
- Titanomachya
- Titanosaurus
- "Titanosaurus" – preoccupied name, now known as Atlantosaurus
- Tlatolophus
- Tochisaurus
- "Tomodon" – preoccupied name, now known as Diplotomodon
- Tonganosaurus
- Tongnanlong
- Tongtianlong
- "Tonouchisaurus" – nomen nudum
- Torilion – junior synonym of Barilium
- Tornieria
- Torosaurus

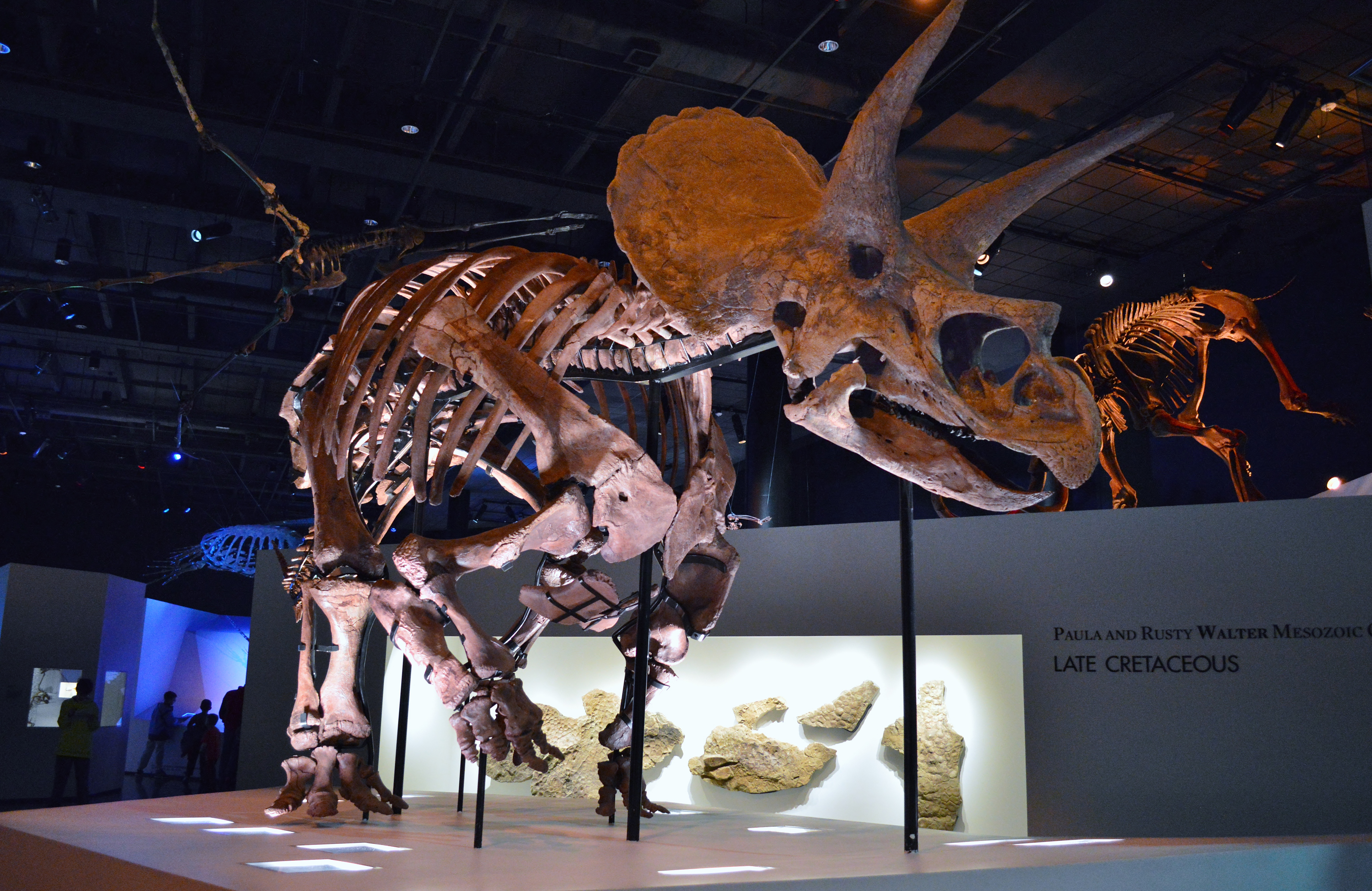
Skeleton of Triceratops at the Houston Museum of Natural Science

- Torvosaurus
- Tototlmimus
- Trachelosaurus – subsequently found to be a basal archosauromorph
- Trachodon
- Tralkasaurus
- Transylvanosaurus
- Tratayenia
- Traukutitan
- Trialestes – subsequently found to be a basal crocodylomorph
- "Triassolestes" – preoccupied name, now known as Trialestes
- Tribelesodon – junior synonym of Tanystropheus, a protorosaur
- Triceratops
- Trierarchuncus
- Trigonosaurus
- Trimucrodon
- Trinisaura
- Triunfosaurus
- Tromerosaurus
- Troodon
- Tsaagan
- Tsagantegia
- Tsintaosaurus
- Tuebingosaurus
- Tugulusaurus
- Tuojiangosaurus
- Turanoceratops
- Turiasaurus
- Tylocephale
- Tylosteus – synonym of Pachycephalosaurus
- Tyrannomimus
- Tyrannosaurus
- Tyrannotitan

== U ==
Contents:	A B C D E F G H I J K L M N O P Q R S T U V W X Y Z – See also

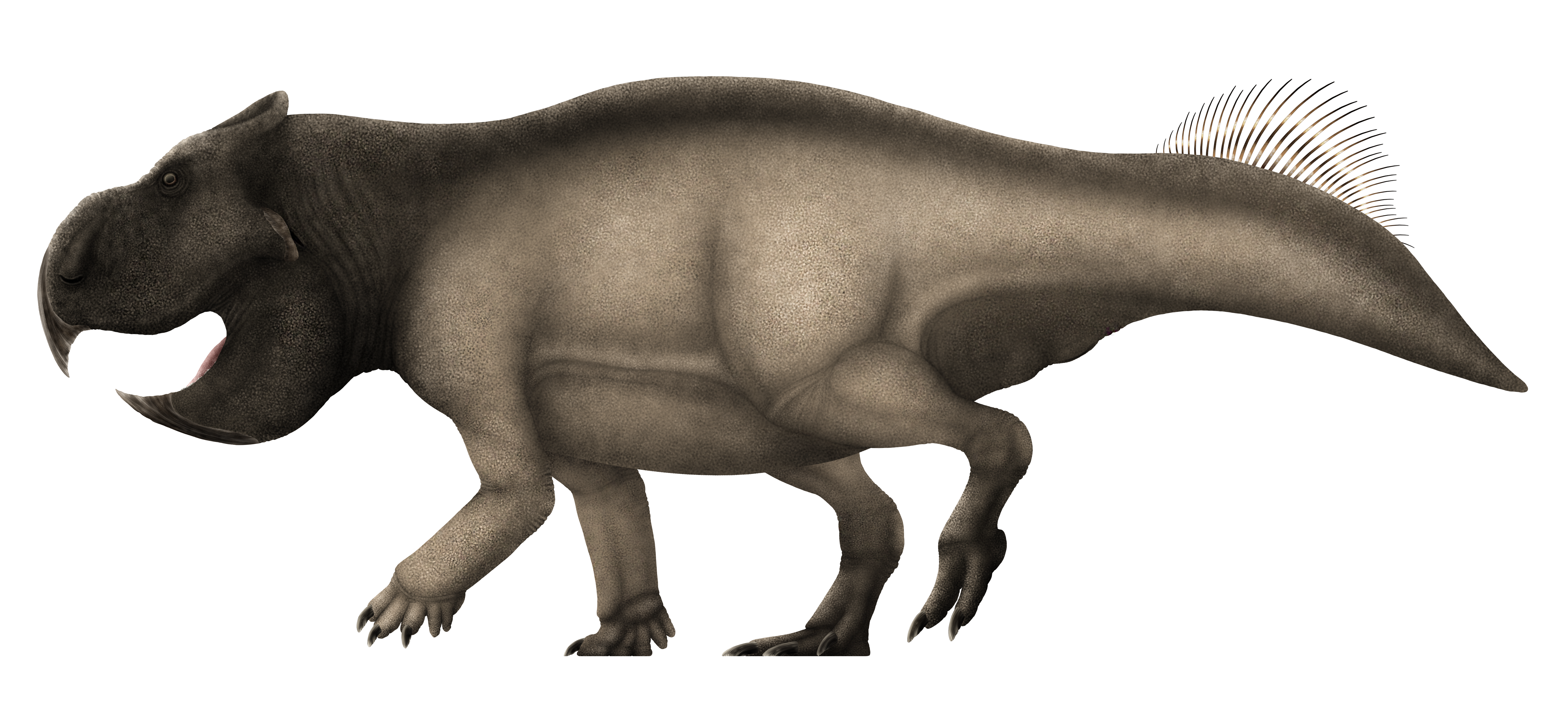
Restoration of Udanoceratops

- Uberabatitan
- "Ubirajara" – nomen nudum
- Udanoceratops
- Udelartitan
- Ugrosaurus – junior synonym of Triceratops
- Ugrunaaluk – junior synonym of Edmontosaurus
- Uintasaurus – junior synonym of Camarasaurus
- Ultrasauros – junior synonym of Supersaurus
- "Ultrasaurus" – preoccupied name, renamed Ultrasauros which is now a junior synonym of Supersaurus
- Ultrasaurus
- Ulughbegsaurus
- "Umarsaurus" – nomen nudum; Barsboldia
- Unaysaurus
- Unenlagia
- Unescoceratops
- "Unicerosaurus" – nomen nudum, subsequently found to be a fish
- Unquillosaurus
- Uragasaurus
- Urbacodon
- Uriash
- Utahceratops
- Utahraptor
- Uteodon
- Utetitan

== V ==
Contents:	A B C D E F G H I J K L M N O P Q R S T U V W X Y Z – See also

- Vagaceratops
- Vahiny
- Valdoraptor – possible synonym of Thecocoelurus
- Valdosaurus
- Vallibonavenatrix
- Variraptor
- Vayuraptor
- Vectaerovenator
- Vectensia – junior synonym of Polacanthus or Hylaeosaurus
- Vectidromeus
- Vectipelta
- Vectiraptor

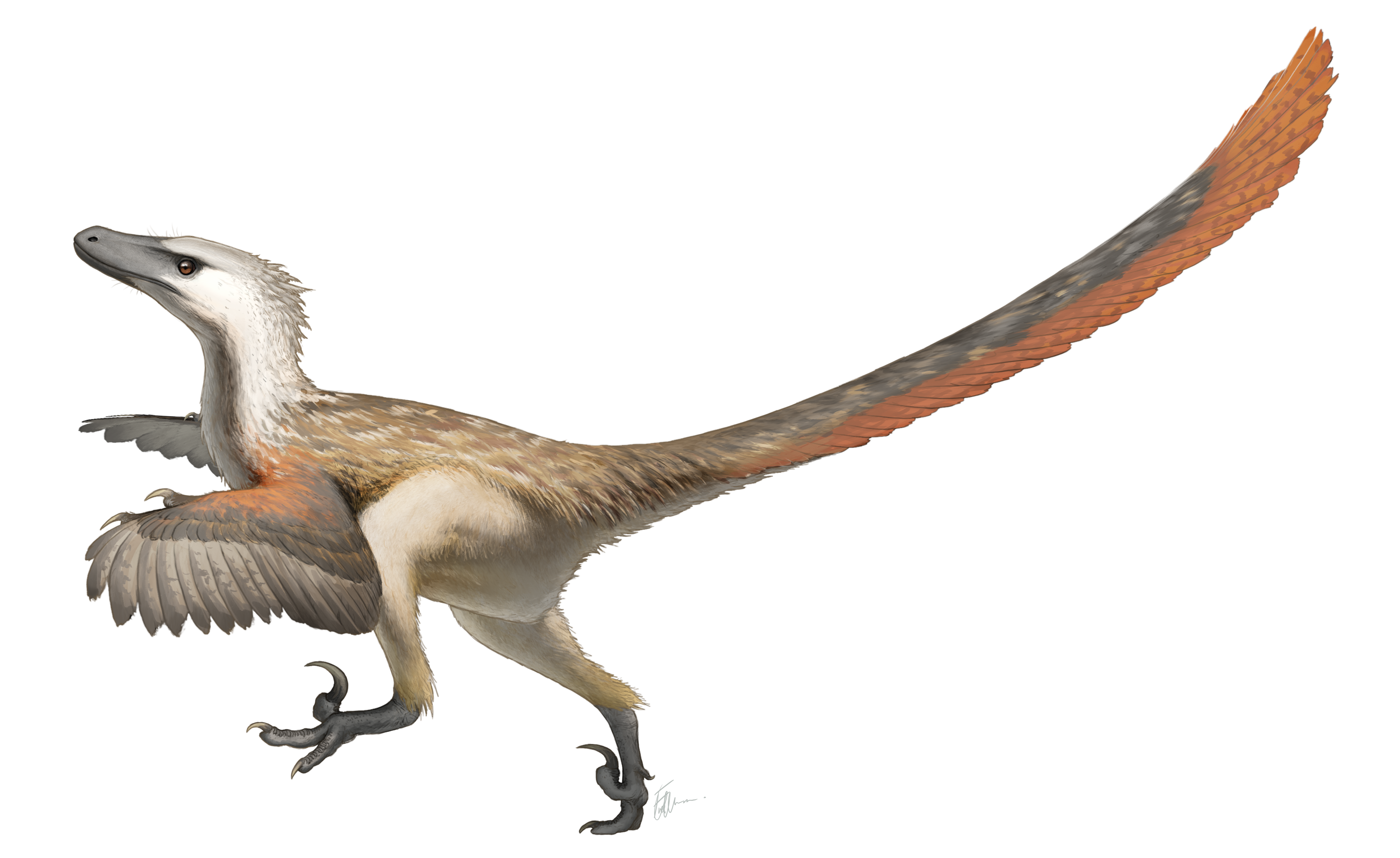
Life restoration of Velociraptor

- Vectisaurus – junior synonym of Mantellisaurus
- "Vectispinus" – nomen nudum
- Velafrons
- Velocipes
- Velociraptor
- Velocisaurus
- Venaticosuchus – subsequently found to be a non-dinosaurian archosaur
- Venenosaurus
- Vespersaurus
- Veterupristisaurus
- Viavenator
- "Vitakridrinda" – nomen nudum
- "Vitakrisaurus" – nomen nudum
- Vitosaura
- Volgatitan
- Volkheimeria
- Vouivria
- Vulcanodon

== W ==
Contents:	A B C D E F G H I J K L M N O P Q R S T U V W X Y Z – See also

- Wadhurstia – junior synonym of Hypselospinus
- Wakinosaurus
- Walgettosuchus – possible synonym of Rapator
- "Walkeria" – preoccupied name, now known as Alwalkeria
- "Walkersaurus" – nomen nudum; Duriavenator
- Wamweracaudia
- Wannanosaurus
- Weewarrasaurus

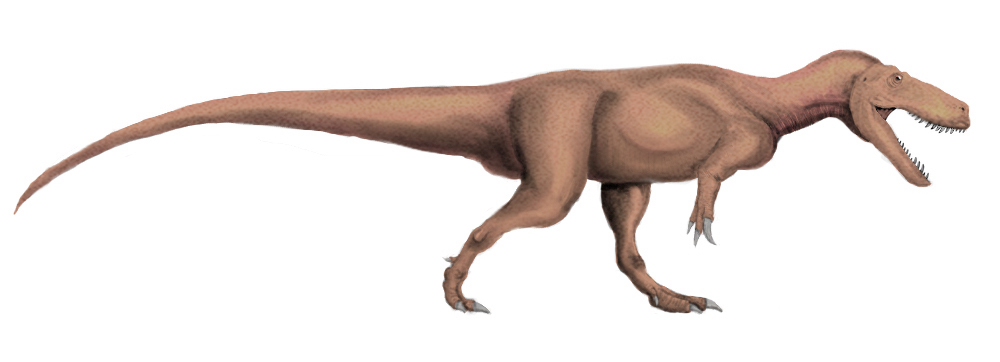
Life restoration of Wiehenvenator

- Wellnhoferia – possibly a bird; possible junior synonym of Archaeopteryx
- Wendiceratops
- Wiehenvenator
- Willinakaqe
- Wintonotitan
- Wudingloong
- Wuerhosaurus
- Wulagasaurus
- Wulatelong
- "Wulatesaurus" – nomen nudum; Bannykus
- Wulong
- Wyleyia – possibly a bird
- "Wyomingraptor" – nomen nudum; synonym of Allosaurus

== X ==
Contents:	A B C D E F G H I J K L M N O P Q R S T U V W X Y Z – See also

- Xenoceratops
- Xenoposeidon
- Xenotarsosaurus
- Xenovenator
- Xiangyunloong
- Xianshanosaurus
- Xiaosaurus

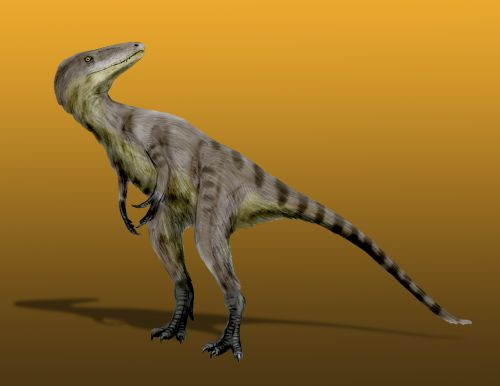
Life reconstruction of Xiongguanlong

- Xiaotingia
- "Xinghesaurus" – nomen nudum
- Xingtianosaurus
- Xingxiulong
- Xinjiangovenator
- Xinjiangtitan
- Xiongguanlong
- Xixianykus
- Xixiasaurus
- Xixiposaurus
- Xiyunykus
- Xuanhanosaurus
- Xuanhuaceratops
- "Xuanhuasaurus" – nomen nudum; Xuanhuaceratops
- Xunmenglong
- Xuwulong

== Y ==
Contents:	A B C D E F G H I J K L M N O P Q R S T U V W X Y Z – See also

- Yaleosaurus – junior synonym of Anchisaurus
- Yamaceratops
- Yamanasaurus
- Yamatosaurus
- Yanbeilong
- Yandusaurus
- Yangchuanosaurus
- Yantaloong
- Yaverlandia – possibly non-dinosaurian
- Yehuecauhceratops
- Yeneen
- "Yezosaurus" – nomen nudum; subsequently found to be a junior synonym of the mosasaur Taniwhasaurus
- Yi
- "Yibinosaurus" – nomen nudum

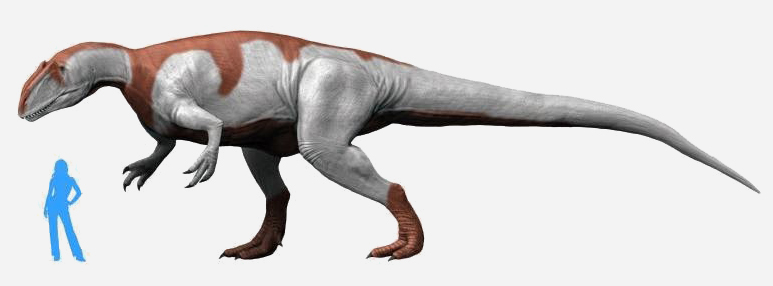
Life restoration of Yangchuanosaurus

- Yimenosaurus
- Yingshanosaurus
- Yinlong
- Yixianosaurus
- Yizhousaurus
- Yongjinglong
- Ypupiara
- Yuanmouraptor
- Yuanmousaurus
- Yuanyanglong
- Yueosaurus
- Yulong
- Yunganglong
- Yunmenglong
- Yunnanosaurus
- "Yunxianosaurus" – nomen nudum
- Yunyangosaurus
- Yurgovuchia
- Yutyrannus
- Yuxisaurus
- Yuzhoulong

== Z ==
Contents:	A B C D E F G H I J K L M N O P Q R S T U V W X Y Z – See also

- Zalmoxes
- Zanabazar
- Zanclodon – subsequently found to be non-dinosaurian
- Zapalasaurus
- Zapsalis
- Zaraapelta
- Zatomus – subsequently found to be a non-dinosaurian archosaur
- Zavacephale
- Zby
- Zephyrosaurus
- Zhanghenglong
- Zhejiangosaurus
- Zhenyuanlong

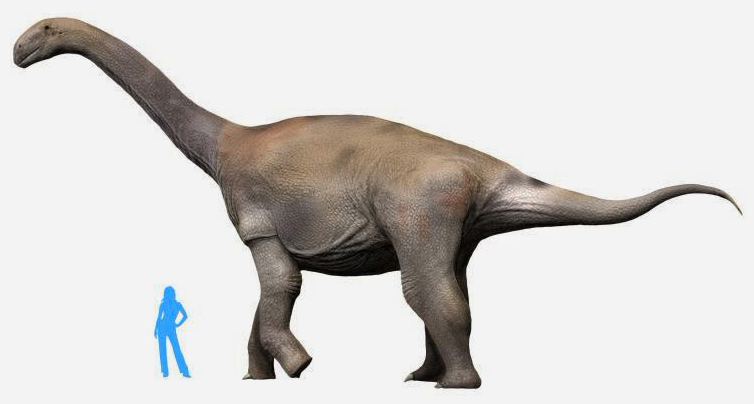
Life restoration of Zby

- Zhongjianosaurus
- Zhongornis – subsequently found to be a bird
- Zhongyuansaurus – possible junior synonym of Gobisaurus
- Zhuchengceratops
- Zhuchengosaurus – junior synonym of Shantungosaurus
- Zhuchengtitan
- Zhuchengtyrannus
- Ziapelta
- Zigongosaurus
- Zizhongosaurus
- Zuniceratops
- "Zunityrannus" – nomen nudum, Suskityrannus
- Zuolong
- Zuoyunlong
- Zupaysaurus
- Zuul

== See also ==
- Dinosaur classification
- List of informally named dinosaurs
- List of dinosaur ichnogenera
- List of fossil bird genera
- List of birds (orders and families)
- List of bird genera
- List of ichthyosauromorph genera
- List of plesiosaur genera
- List of Mesozoic birds
- List of mosasaur genera
- List of pterosaur genera
- List of South American dinosaurs
- List of North American dinosaurs
- List of African dinosaurs
- List of Asian dinosaurs
- List of European dinosaurs
- List of Indian and Madagascan dinosaurs
- List of Australian and Antarctic dinosaurs

== Notes ==
- Most uncited genus names are taken from Olshevsky's "Dinosaur Genera List". Non-dinosaur dinosauromorphs and non-avebrevicaudan avialans are also listed by Olshevsky, but are omitted from this list as they are not considered "non-avian dinosaurs" in most published sources.
