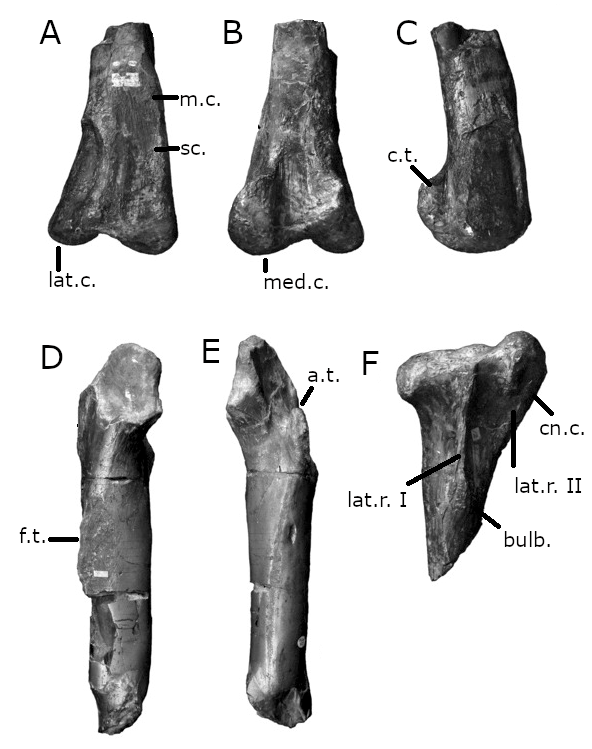
- Known fossil material

Scientific classification
- Kingdom: Animalia
- Phylum: Chordata
- Class: Reptilia
- Clade: Dinosauria
- Clade: Saurischia
- Clade: Theropoda
- Clade: Averostra
- Genus: †Dornraptor
- Species: †D. normani

Binomial name
- †Dornraptor normani Baron, 2024

Synonyms
- "Merosaurus newmani" Pickering, 1995

= Dornraptor =

Dornraptor Temporal range: Early Jurassic (Late Sinemurian), 194–192 Ma

Genus of theropod dinosaurs

Dornraptor (meaning "Dorset robber or thief") is an extinct genus of averostran theropod dinosaur from the Early Jurassic (Late Sinemurian) of Charmouth, Dorset, England. The genus contains a single species, D. normani, known from a fragmentary knee joint and femur that were initially described by Sir Richard Owen as belonging to the early armored dinosaur Scelidosaurus. Dornraptor lived in what is now England, along other theropods like Dracoraptor and Sarcosaurus.

Dornraptor was described as having come from the Blue Lias Formation in 2024, although previous authors proposed a corrected locality of the Charmouth Mudstone Formation.

== History of discovery ==
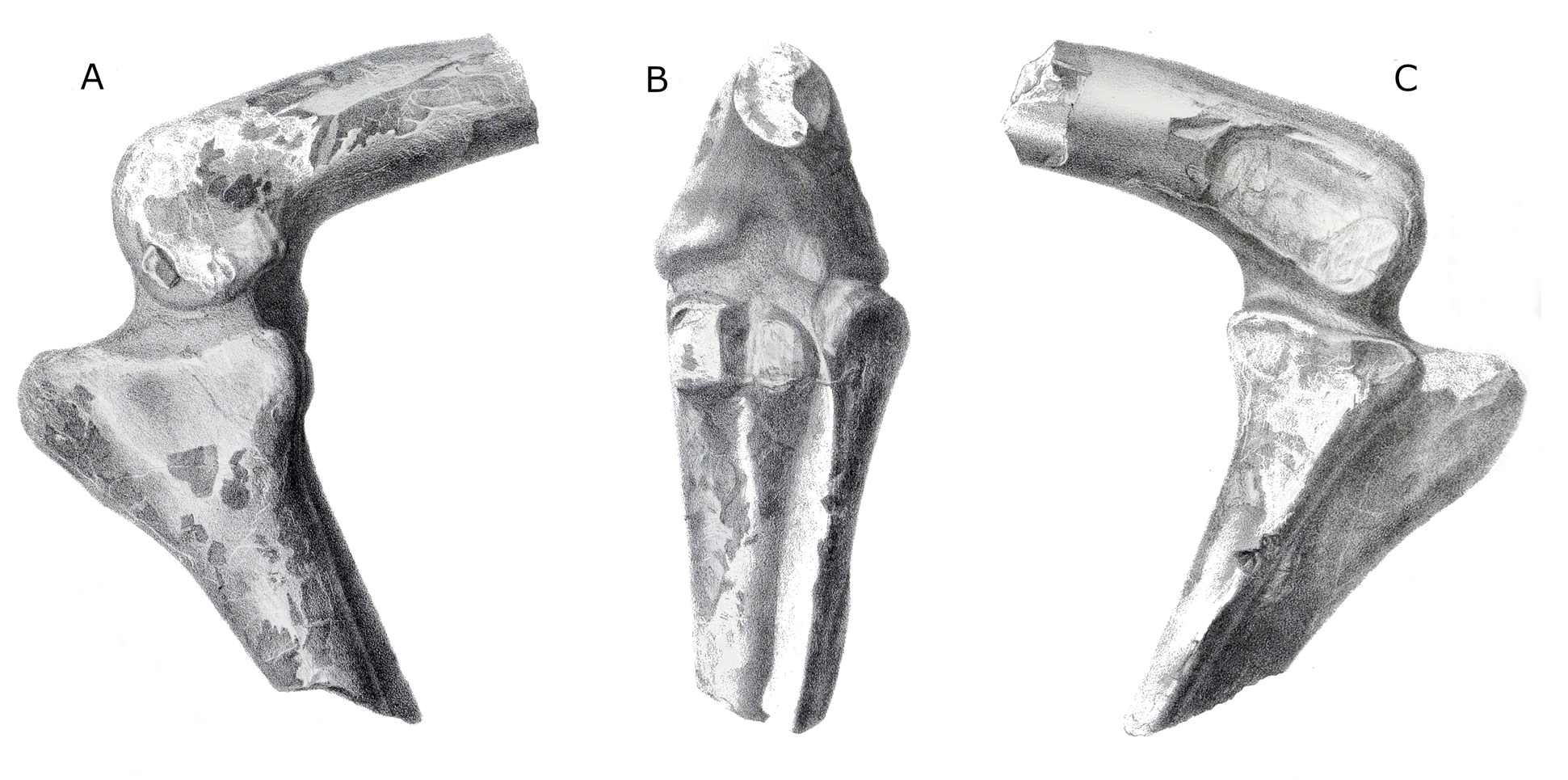
Know skeletal material and Illustration of the articulated holotype, including the missing fibula

In 1858, Richard Owen received fragmentary dinosaur leg bones discovered by James Harrison in Charmouth, Dorset. These included a right knee joint—comprising the articulated distal end of the femur and a proximal third of the tibia and fibula—and a partial left femur. He used them as part of the type material of the thyreophoran Scelidosaurus when describing it in 1859. Subsequent studies reconsidered their classification, suggesting early theropod affinities within the Saurischia, rather than an early thyreophoran within the Ornithischia.

The informal name "Merosaurus newmani" was coined by Samuel Paul Welles, H. P. Powell, and Stephan Pickering in 1995 in an unpublished manuscript for the theropod material. Carrano and Sampson (2004) proposed that the articulated knee joint likely belonged to a basal, indeterminate tetanuran theropod. Darren Naish and David Martill (2007) also assigned these specimens to the Tetanurae. In 2010, Roger Benson suggested that the bones could be attributed to the Coelophysoidea, while ultimately concluding that both specimens were indeterminate theropods.

In 2024, Dornraptor normani was formally described as a new genus and species of averostran theropod by Matthew G. Baron. He established NHMUK (BMNH) 39496, the right knee joint, as the holotype specimen. The partial fibula originally described by Owen as belonging to this specimen has since been lost. GSM 109560, the left femur, was also referred to the genus. The generic name, Dornraptor, combines "Dorn", an abbreviated form of the Anglo-Saxon Dornwaraceaster—referring to the English region of Dorset—with the Latin word "raptor", meaning "robber" or "thief", which is frequently used in the names of small and medium-sized theropods. The specific name, normani, honours British palaeontologist David B. Norman.

== Description ==
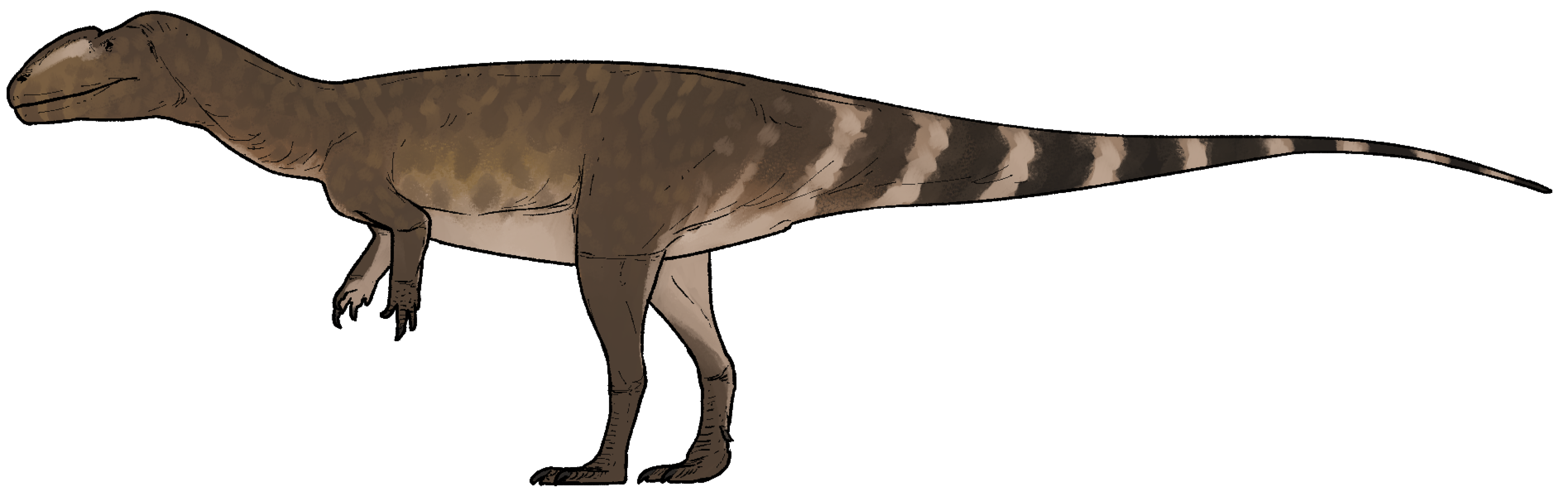
Speculative life restoration based on related taxa

Dornraptor stands out from other theropods due to a large scar along the medial side of the distal end of the femur, a medial distal crest, and a prominent anterior trochanter separated from the head by a cleft. Additionally, it possesses a shallow trochanteric shelf and a foramen on the anterior surface of the femur. Its femur also features a deep anterior sulcus between the articular condyles and a medial condyle with similar anteroposterior diameter to the width of the articular surface. Dornraptor exhibits an elongated cnemial crest reaching proximally beyond the medial and lateral condyles, along with a pronounced fibular crest extending up to the proximal end of the tibia. The lateral side of the tibia also displays a sharp crest parallel to the fibular crest, forming a distinct bulge distally. Additionally, the proximal end of the tibia shows a separate crest, not connected to the fibular crest, and a noticeable cleft between the posterior condyles. Lastly, the lateral condyle of the tibia forms an acute angle when viewed from the medial side.

== Classification ==
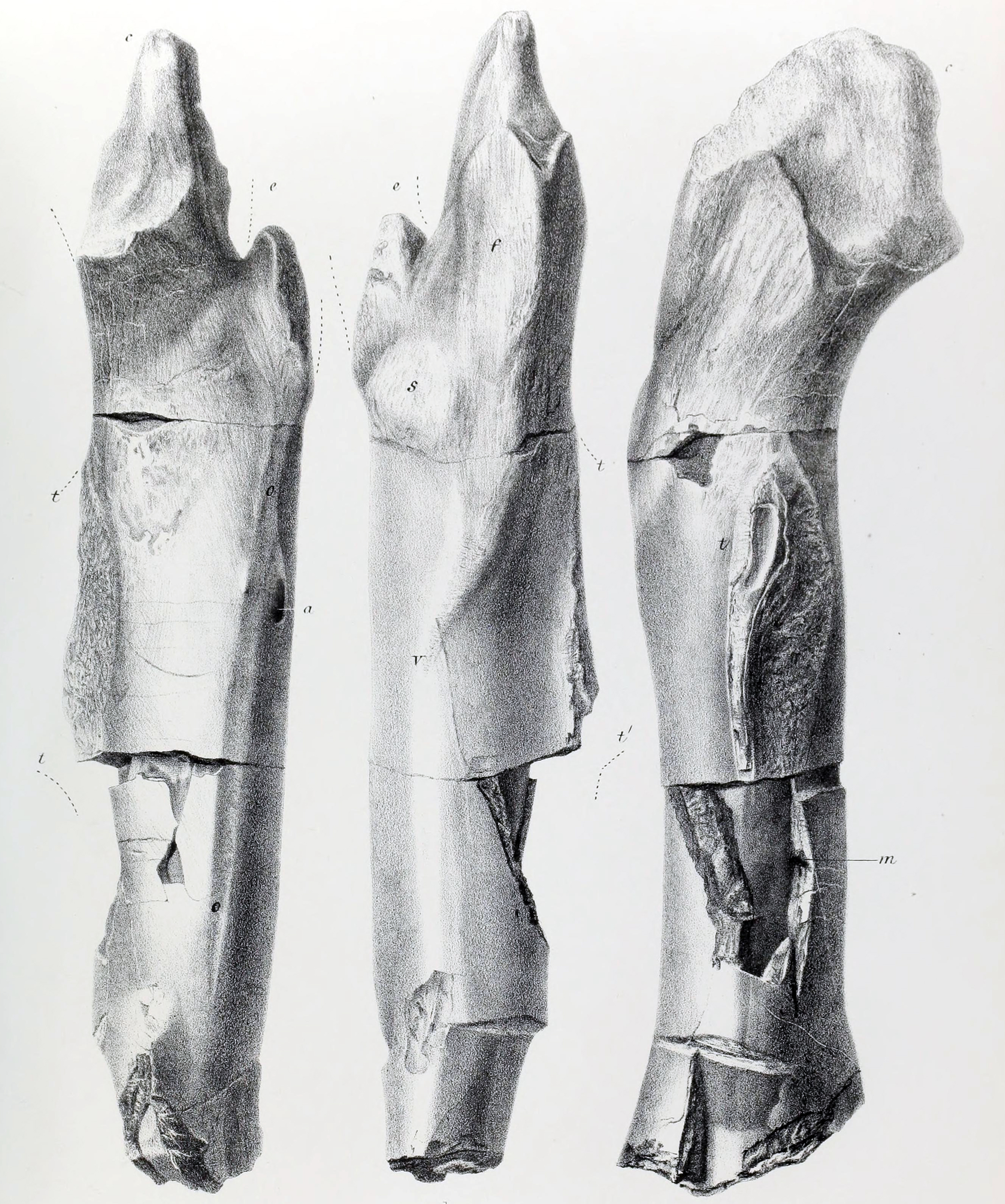
Lithograph of the assigned femur

Early reviews of the fossil material suggested coelophysoid, tetanuran, and ceratosaurian affinities. While specimens NHMUK 39496 and GSM 109560 lack anatomical overlap, their discovery in the same stratigraphic unit, along with similar size and proportions, suggests they belong to the same taxon, distinct from earlier forms and contemporaneous taxa like Dracoraptor and Sarcosaurus. Utilizing a modified version of the Baron et al. (2017) phylogenetic dataset, Dornraptor was found to be an early-branching averostran theropod in a polytomy with Elaphrosaurus, Cryolophosaurus, and the clade containing Allosaurus and Piatnitzkysaurus. This clade was recovered as the sister group to a clade containing the ceratosaurs Eoabelisaurus and Ceratosaurus. These results are displayed in the cladogram below, with Dornraptor and the contemporary non-averostrans Dracoraptor and Sarcosaurus in bold:

- Theropoda
  - Zupaysaurus
  - **Sarcosaurus**
  - Panguraptor
  - Dracovenator
  - Dilophosaurus
  - - Liliensternus
    - Lophostropheus
  - - Procompsognathus
    - Coelophysis
  - - 'Syntarsus'
    - **Dracoraptor**
  - - Sinosaurus
    - Averostra
      - - Eoabelisaurus
        - Ceratosaurus
      - - **Dornraptor**
        - Elaphrosaurus
        - Cryolophosaurus
        - - Allosaurus
          - Piatnitzkysaurus

Scoring Dornraptor in other matrices also resulted in its placement in various basal positions within the Averostra, outside of the major clades Abelisauroidea and Coelurosauria.

Following the formal description of Dornraptor, Mickey Mortimer discussed it on the Theropod Database blog, noting that some of the characters used by researchers to exclude tetanuran affinities for the holotype are found in some basal members of this clade, such as Chuandongocoelurus, Dubreuillosaurus, and Eustreptospondylus. One definitive feature—the bulbous fibular crest—supports Dornraptor as a tetanuran, as it is found in genera including Megalosaurus, Piatnitzkysaurus, and Sinraptor. The referred femur is similar to Dilophosaurus, Liliensternus, ceratosaurs, and tetanurans, suggesting it either comes from a gracile ceratosaur or a tetanuran.

== Paleoenvironment ==
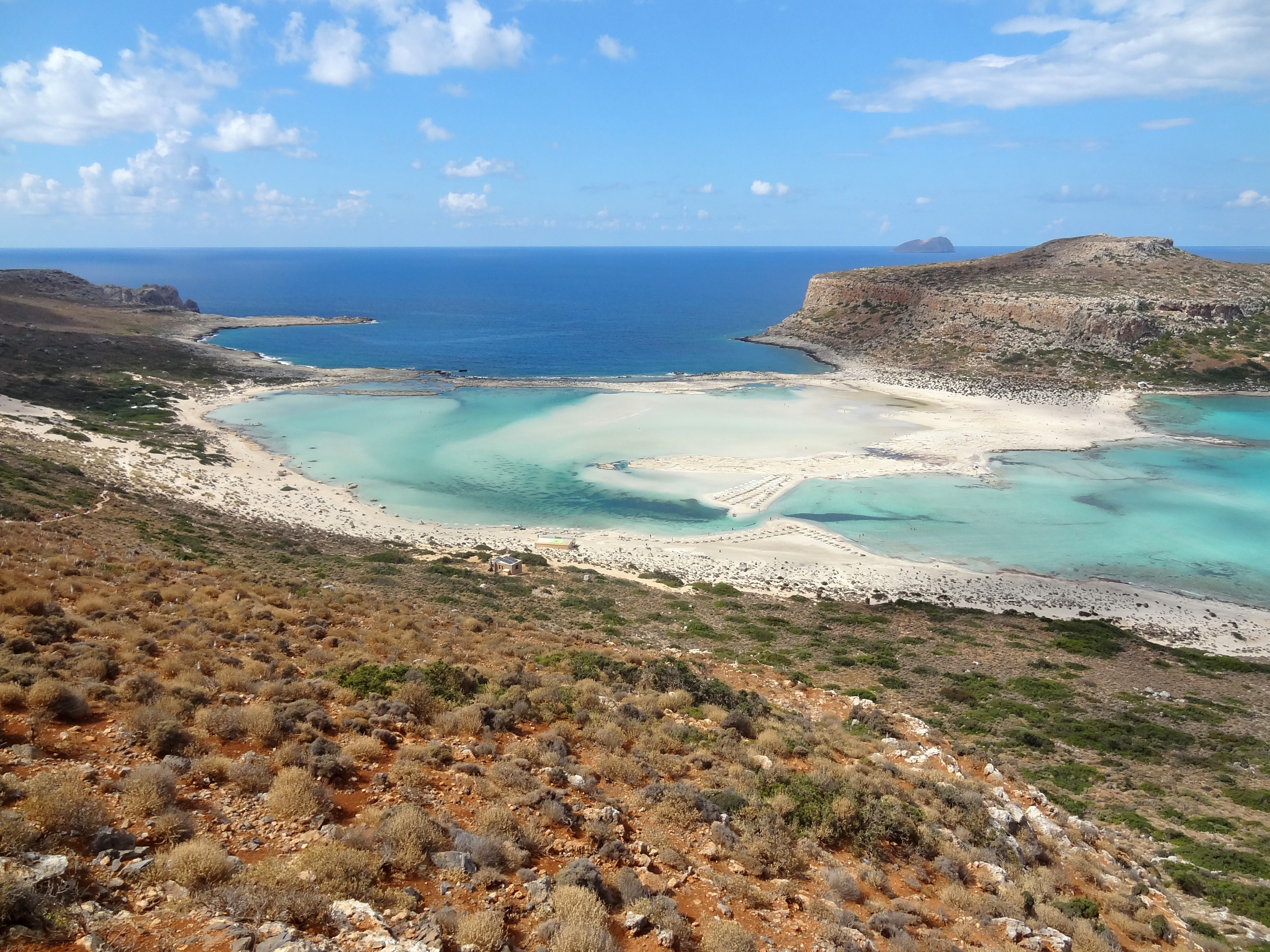
Adjacent emerged landmasses, were arid or semiarid settings, similar to modern Mediterranean islands

The Charmouth Mudstone Formation and underlying Blue Lias were mostly shallow marine environments, with both formations containing a wide variety of marine fossils, including various ammonites, belemnites, crinoids, mollusks, and crustaceans. Marine invertebrates include ichthyosaurs, plesiosaurs, and thalattosuchians. Occasionally, rare small pieces of fossilized wood are found. Inner continental landmasses were an archipelago of large islands inherited from Caledonian and Variscan massifs, where the Dorset area was part of the Wessex Basin, bordered by the London-Brabant, Armorican, Cornubian, and Welsh Massifs, divided into sub-basins by east–west faults that were the source for siliclastic material, as recorded in coeval boreholes. The basin was deposited on the Mid-Dorset High fault block. Generally in the Early Jurassic there was a regional and global marine transgression, covering northwest Europe with a shallow sea, punctuated by smaller sea-level changes, locally driven by a mix of global sea-level shifts and local geological movements. Sea levels rose during the Lower Sinemurian (turneri and raricostatum Zones) and fell during the Late Sinemurian (obtusum and oxynotum) Zones on the London Platform, at the time Dornraptor and other dinosaurs are recovered.

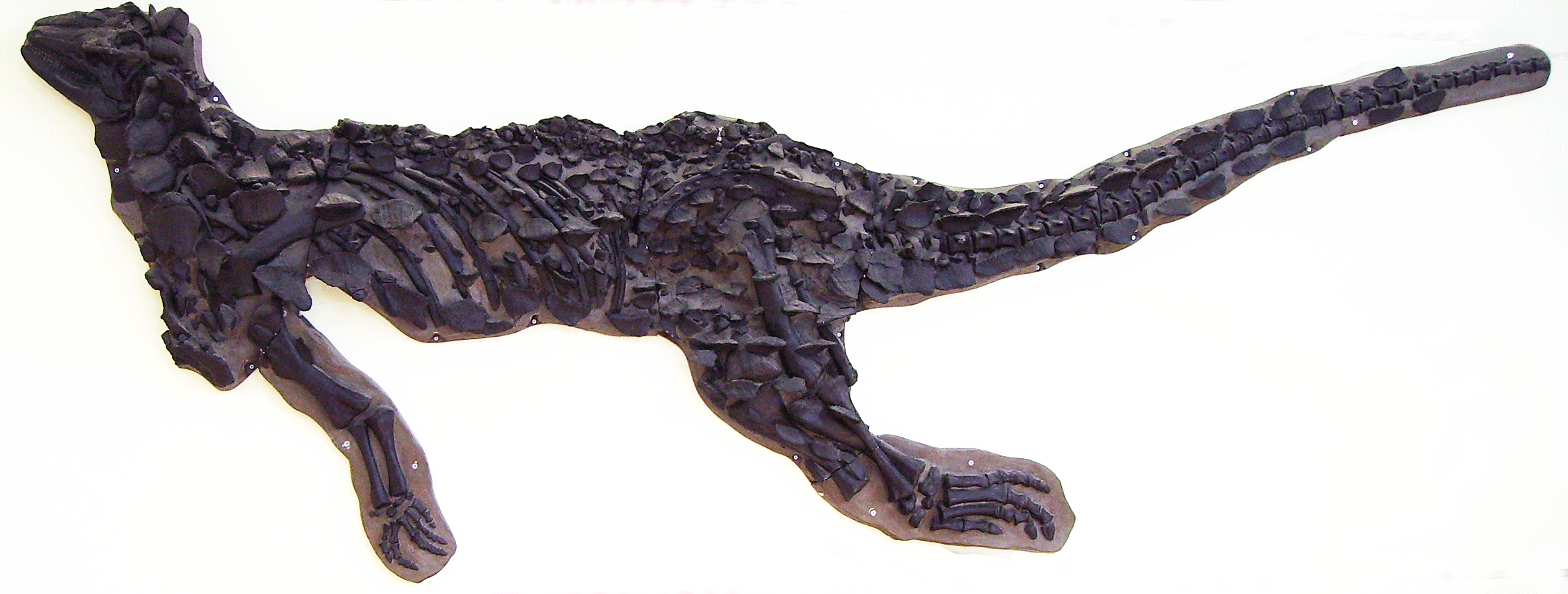
Skeleton cast of the coeval Scelidosaurus

Other dinosaurs from the locality include the well-known thyreophoran Scelidosaurus, as well as indeterminate theropod remains suggesting smaller Coelophysis-sized taxa, with Dornraptor likely being the terrestrial apex predator. Other terrestrial taxa include the pterosaur Dimorphodon, as well the synapsid Oligokyphus. A large insect fauna is known, made of beetles, blattodeans, dragonflies, grasshoppers, etc. The flora included members of the Bennettitales, Corystospermaceae and conifers. Palynology indicates the presence of taxa like the "seed ferns" Alisporites, the "cycadophyte" Chasmatosporites, and the dominant Hirmeriellaceae conifer Corollina and Classopollis, suggesting arid or semiarid environments, usually compared with modern Mediterranean islands.
