= Panguraptor =

Panguraptor Temporal range: Early Jurassic
- Holotype skeleton (LFGT-0103), National Natural History Museum of China

Scientific classification
- Kingdom: Animalia
- Phylum: Chordata
- Class: Reptilia
- Clade: Dinosauria
- Clade: Saurischia
- Clade: Theropoda
- Superfamily: †Coelophysoidea
- Genus: †Panguraptor; You et al., 2014

Type species
- Panguraptor lufengensis You et al., 2014

Extinct genus of dinosaurs

Panguraptor ("Pangu [a Chinese god] plunderer") is a genus of coelophysoid theropod dinosaur known from fossils discovered in Lower Jurassic rocks of southern China. The type and only known species is Panguraptor lufengensis. The generic name refers to the deity Pangu but also to the supercontinent Pangaea for which in a geological context the same characters are used: 盘古. Raptor means "seizer", "robber" in Latin. The specific name is a reference to the Lufeng Formation. It was described in 2014 by You Hai-Lu and colleagues.

== History and naming ==
The specimen that would be named Panguraptor was discovered by a survey team of the Bureau of Land and Resources of Lufeng County, China, on the hillside behind Xiaolishu Village, Lufeng Dinosaur Mountain Town. The team found the partially articulated skeleton exposed on the slope on 12 October 2007. Due to weathering, there was not time to slowly clean the skeleton, so it was glued and plastered on location over the course of two days before being shipped to Lufeng World Dinosaur Valley. After four years it was inventoried and discovered to be a complete theropod skeleton, at which point it was cleaned and prepared over the course of a year. In 2014 the fossil, catalogued as Bureau of Land and Resources of Lufeng County LFGT-0103, was described by Chinese paleontologist Hailu You and colleagues as the type specimen of the new theropod Panguraptor lufengensis. The name is derived from the creator of all reality in Chinese mythology Pangu, the Latin word raptor for "thief" or "robber", and the Lufeng County.

Sediments that Panguraptor were found in correspond to the Shawan Member of the Lufeng Formation. These beds have also been known as the Dull Purplish Beds of the Lower Lufeng Formation, and have been dated using magnetostratigraphy to the late Sinemurian to possibly Toarcian. Only the single specimen of Panguraptor has been found, which includes a partially complete articulated skeleton with the skull, neck, and back, most of the right forelimb, and both hindlimbs. It can be seen from the right side, and after being on display at Lufeng World Dinosaur Valley, it was exhibited at the Hong Kong Science Museum from October 2013 to April 2014, before being returned to Lufeng World Dinosaur Valley for display in the exhibition hall.

== Description ==
The holotype of Panguraptor, LFGT-0103, is the partial articulated skeleton of a subadult individual, including the skull, lower jaws, presacral vertebrae, first sacral vertebra, parts of the pectoral girdle and pelvic girdle, a left femur and most of the right limb. This specimen is likely a sub-adult due to its small size (approximately 2 meters long in life), large orbit, and unfused scapulocoracoids and astragalocalcaneum. However, it may have been close to adulthood due to having other bones which have fused.

The rather short skull is almost complete, although the premaxilla and rostral edge of the maxilla are missing and the nasals are partially obscured. The orbit is quite large but the antorbital fenestra is quite small. The exposed portions of the nasal are wide and smooth and do not show any sign of a sagittal crest present in some other basal theropods. The jugal is positioned similarly to that of C. rhodesiensis, although the quadratojugal is positioned more akin to that of Coelophysis ("Megapnosaurus") kayentakatae. The rostral end of the lower jaw is missing. Teeth are preserved in the dentary and maxilla, and are slightly recurved yet unserrated.

The centra of the cervical vertebrae gradually increase in length from the third to seventh cervical, then decrease once more to the tenth (last) cervical. The dorsal vertebrae are more compressed than those of Coelophysis bauri and C. rhodesiensis, and their neural spines are longer than they are high and so close to each other that they form a continuous wall along the dorsal vertebral column.

The scapula is long, with a scapular blade with a straight caudal edge and concave cranial edge. The hand has four digits, with metacarpals I and II being the widest and metatarsals II and III being the longest. The first digit also has a flattened and recurved claw, the largest found in the holotype.

The right ilium, though incomplete, has a stout pubic peduncle a prominent supracetabular crest. Distal portions of both ischia are preserved, and are straight with broad ends.

The femur has a large and offset head and a longitudinal bulge on the caudolateral surface of the shaft. The tibia and fibula are straight while the astragalus and calcaneum are unfused. Only one tarsal is exposed (likely tarsal IV) along with right metatarsals III, IV, and V and a few pedal digits. Metatarsal III is very long while IV and V taper distally.

Panguraptor can be distinguished from other coelophysids by the following traits:

- A diagonal ridge on the lateral surface of the maxilla, within the antorbital fossa.
- An elliptical fenestra (also known in Zupaysaurus) caudodorsal to the above-mentioned ridge.
- a distal tarsal IV with a hooked craniomedial corner.

== Classification ==
You et al. (2014) performed a phylogenetic analysis and found Panguraptor to be a coelophysid coelophysoid, in a clade with Coelophysis, Megapnosaurus (referred to Coelophysis rhodesiensis), and Camposaurus but not "Syntarsus" kayentakatae. Panguraptor was placed in this clade due to having a very acute angle between the horizontal and ascending processes of the maxilla, a blind pocket within the antorbital fossa, a short lateral lamina of the lacrimal, and the ascending process of the jugal making an angle less than 75 degrees with its longitudinal axis. Per this analysis, Panguraptor would be the first coelophysoid known from Asia. It is also the second definite theropod genus known from the Lufeng Formation, after Sinosaurus. Other small coelophysoid specimens such as FMNH CUP 2089 (some forelimb bones) and FMNH CUP 2090 (some hindlimb bones) recovered from the Lufeng formation may belong to this species, although they have been provisionally referred to "Syntarsus" kayentakatae until further analysis. The phylogenetic analysis of Martínez and Apaldetti in 2017 added Panguraptor, with it being recovered as a member of Coelophysidae.

- Coelophysidae
  - "Syntarsus" kayentakatae
  - - Panguraptor lufengensis
    - - Lepidus praecisio
      - - Coelophysis bauri
        - - Coelophysis rhodesiensis (=Megapnosaurus rhodesiensis)
          - Camposaurus arizonensis
          - Lucianovenator bonoi

The recovery of Panguraptor and Megapnosaurus within Coelophysidae expands the content of the group in Pangaea to Asia and Africa, particularly in the Early Jurassic. Though the fossil record is scarce, the distribution of coelophysids endemic to the Americas in the Late Triassic before becoming globally distributed in the Early Jurassic may support the change from faunal regionalism to faunal homogeneity at the beginning of the Jurassic.

In 2026, Zhang and colleagues recovered Panguraptor as a basal (early-diverging) member of the superfamily Coelophysoidea in their phylogenetic analyses.
