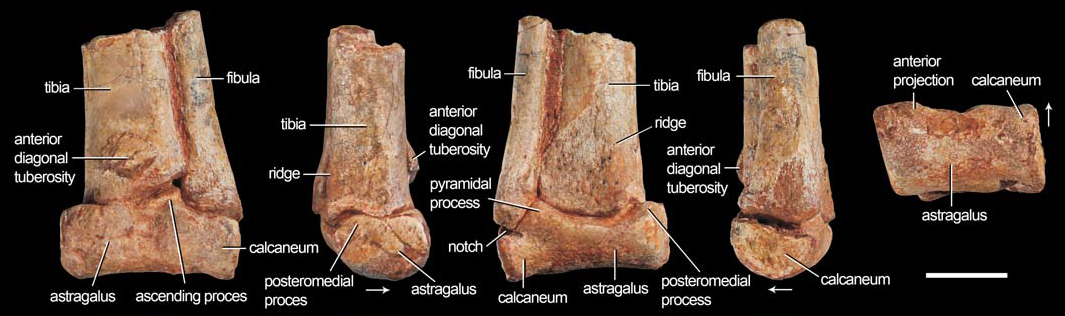
- Holotype ankle

Scientific classification
- Kingdom: Animalia
- Phylum: Chordata
- Class: Reptilia
- Clade: Dinosauria
- Clade: Saurischia
- Clade: Theropoda
- Genus: †Lepidus; Nesbitt & Ezcurra, 2015
- Species: †L. praecisio

Binomial name
- †Lepidus praecisio Nesbitt & Ezcurra, 2015

= Lepidus praecisio =

Lepidus praecisio Temporal range: Upper Triassic, 231–223 Ma

Extinct species of reptile

Lepidus is a genus of extinct theropod from the Upper Triassic of the United States. It lived in the Otis Chalk localities of the Dockum Group in Texas, from 231 to 223 million years ago.

== Discovery ==
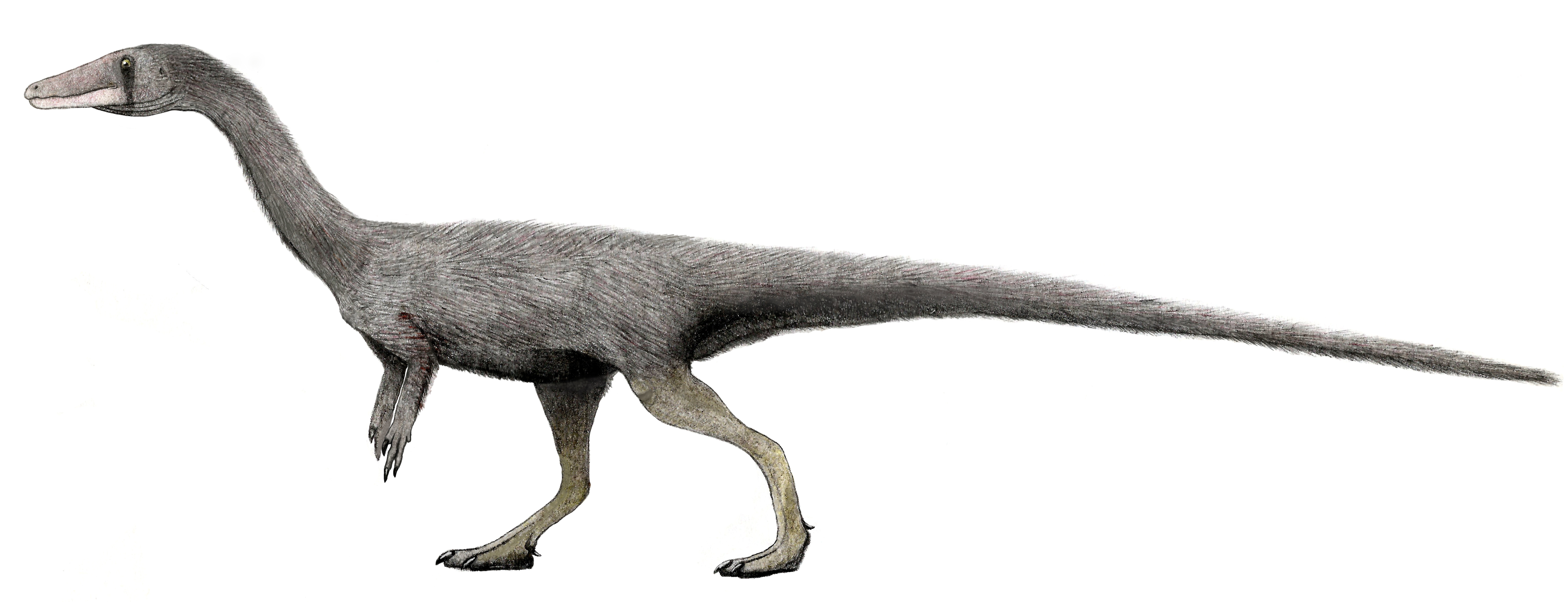
Hypothetical restoration

The locality from which Lepidus is known was discovered in the middle of February 1941 by the Works Progress Administration paleontology team in Texas. The precise geographic locality is unknown, but at the least it is known that the locality is eight miles southeast of the city of Big Spring in Howard County, Texas. Using Google Earth and USGS cartographic maps, the describing authors were able to deduce the fossils were located in the vicinity of Signal Peak. The locality is situated in the Colorado City Formation, which is constrained to about 231-223 Ma in the Carnian to Norian stages of the Upper Triassic.

It was first described in 2015 by Nesbitt & Ezcurra, who decided it warranted a new taxon, which they named Lepidus praecisio. The generic name is Latin for "fascinating", and the specific name is Latin for "fragment", or "scrap". The holotype material includes a tibia, astragalus, and fibula. Other referred material includes a femur and maxilla. Nesbitt and Ezcurra stressed that the maxilla cannot be referred to Lepidus with any kind of confidence, but its morphology is most similar to neotheropods among all archosaurs known from the Colorado City Formation. The holotypic material is well-preserved and shows signs of muscle scars. The astragalus and calcaneum are clearly fused into one bone, with no visible suture. The tibia resembles that of neotheropods, in overall morphology. The shape of the tibia resembles the same in Camposaurus, Coelophysis, Tawa, Eodromaeus, and Herrerasaurus.

Lepidus was one of eighteen dinosaur taxa from 2015 to be described in open access or free-to-read journals.

== Classification ==
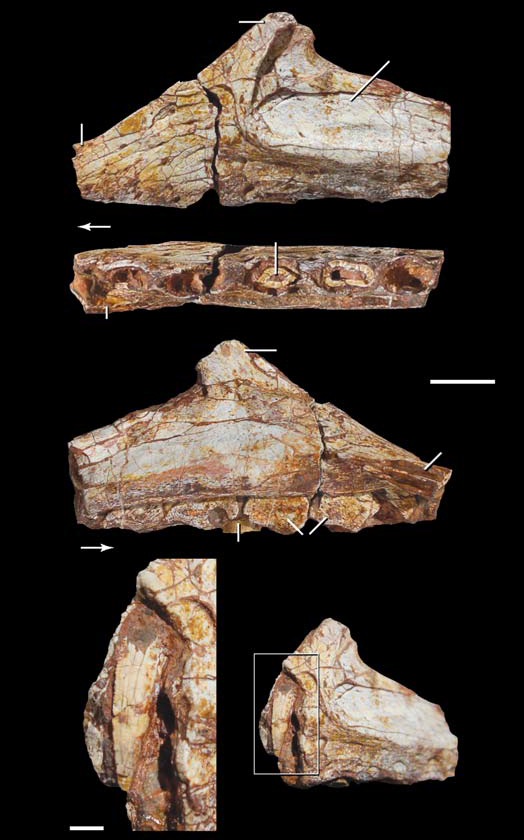
Partial maxilla which may have belonged to the holotype

A phylogenetic analysis was conducted, including with and without referred material. The results are shown below:

- Neotheropoda
  - Liliensternus
  - Zupaysaurus
  - Lepidus (holotype + referred)
  - Coelophysoidea
    - Syntarsus kayentakatae
    - - Lepidus (holotype)
      - - Coelophysis bauri
        - - Coelophysis rhodesiensis
          - Camposaurus arizonensis
  - - Dilophosaurus
    - Cryolophosaurus
    - - Tetanurae
      - Ceratosaurus

More recent phylogenetic analyses recovered this genus as a member or sister taxon of Neotheropoda outside Coelophysoidea.
