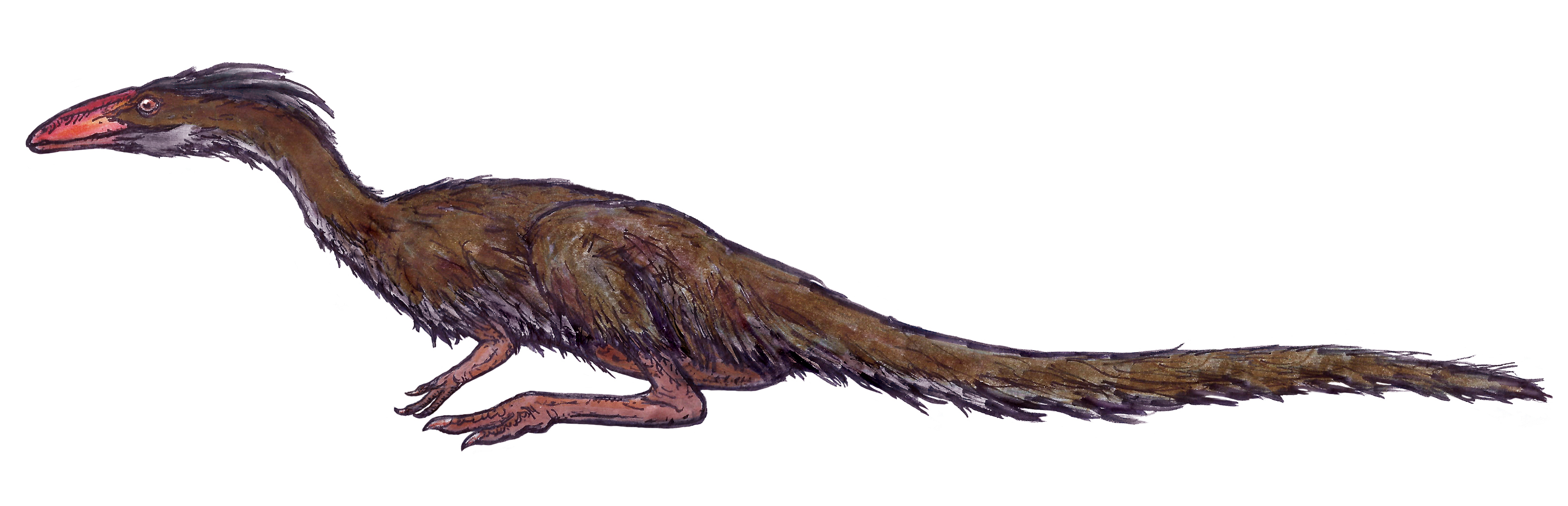
- Life restoration

Scientific classification
- Kingdom: Animalia
- Phylum: Chordata
- Class: Reptilia
- Clade: Dinosauria
- Clade: Saurischia
- Clade: Theropoda
- Family: †Coelophysidae
- Genus: †Lucianovenator; Martinez & Apaldetti, 2017

Type species
- †Lucianovenator bonoi Martinez & Apaldetti, 2017

= Lucianovenator =

Lucianovenator Temporal range: Late Triassic, 210–202 Ma

Extinct genus of dinosaurs

Lucianovenator is an extinct genus of coelophysoid theropod dinosaur which lived in Argentina during the Triassic. The genus name Lucianovenator translates to "Luciano's hunter", in reference to Don Luciano Leyes, who first reported the remains. The species name bonoi refers to Tulio del Bono, a local scientific authority who collaborated on the describers' research. It is one of the few neotheropods known from South America.

== Discovery ==
The holotype (PVSJ 906) of Lucianovenator bonoi was found in the "Quebrada del puma" locality of the Quebrada del Barro Formation in Argentina, which is estimated to be from the late Norian to Rhaetian in age, approximately 210 to 202 million years ago. PVSJ 906 represents an articulated vertebral sequence from the third cervical to fourth dorsal vertebra, as well as a sacrum and a partial pelvis. In addition, three more specimens were referred to Lucianovenator. These include PVSJ 899 (a sacrum and partial pelvis), PVSJ 1013 (a sacrum), and PVSJ 1084 (a sacrum and partial pelvis). PVSJ 1004, the proximal end of a right tibia, may also belong to the species.

== Description ==
Size comparison

As with other neotheropods, the cervical vertebrae of Lucianovenator possess a complex system of fossae (pits) and laminae (ridges) that connect the main body of each vertebra (centra), front and rear joint plates (pre- and post-zygapophyses), and top and bottom rib facets (diapophyses and pleurapophyses) to each other. Although the cervicals of Lucianovenator possess many fossae, four particular examples of paired fossae (four on each side of the vertebrae) can be used to distinguish it from other neotheropods.

The first of these is deep pit located directly at the base of each prezygapophysis, and the second is a larger pit is located immediately behind it. These two pits are obscured by a ridge known as a prezygapophyseal centrodiapophyseal lamina, which connects each prezygapophysis to the each diapophysis, and each diapophysis to the rear portion of the centrum. A third fossa is located at the rear portion of the vertebra. It too is obscured from the side, this time by the centropostzygapophyseal lamina which connects each postzygapophysis to the rear portion of the centrum. Each of the third fossae connects to a pair of large internal cavities which lie adjacent to the canal for the spinal cord. This combination of features is unique to Lucianovenator, as no other coelophysoid possesses all of these features at once. The first and third pairs of fossae are similar to those of "Syntarsus" kayentakatae, but the second pair is not. The third pair does connect to internal cavities in Coelophysis bauri, but so does the first pair, unlike the case in Lucianovenator. Another of Lucianovenator's distinguishing traits is that the anterior cervical ribs are very long (more than five times as long as the cervical centra).

The fourth diagnostic pair of cervical fossae in Lucianovenator is also the only autapomorphy (unique distinguishing trait) of the genus. Lucianovenator is unique in the fact that the edge of each centrodiapophyseal lamina (which connects each diapophysis to the centrum) acquires a long and deep pit, which becomes progressively longer and deeper towards the base of the neck. In cervical 9, the pit is nearly the entire length of the centrodiapophyseal lamina, and is so deep that it is not completely visible from the side.

== Classification ==
A phylogenetic analysis published along with the description of Lucianovenator assigned it to the Coelophysidae, in a clade with Coelophyis rhodesiensis and Camposaurus. This clade is supported by a single feature, the fact that the zygapophyses of the sacral vertebrae are fused. The authors of the paper suggested that the relative rarity of theropods in Rhaetian deposits compared to Norian deposits may be the result of taphonomic bias rather than a decline in diversity.

Subsequent phylogenetic analyses recovered Lucianovenator as a non-coelophysid coelophysoid.

== See also ==
- Timeline of coelophysoid research
- 2017 in archosaur paleontology
