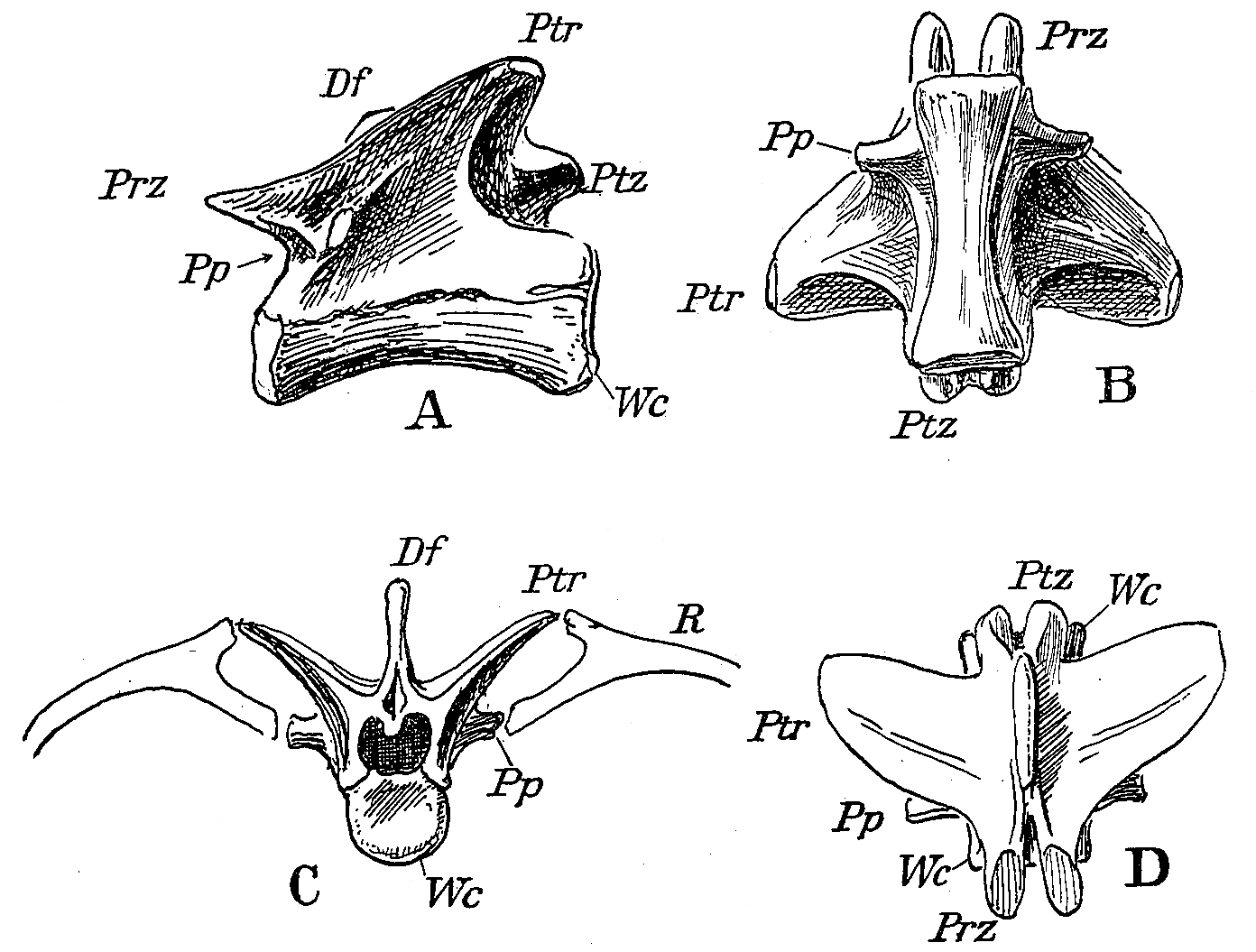
- Back vertebra in several views

Scientific classification
- Domain: Eukaryota
- Kingdom: Animalia
- Phylum: Chordata
- Clade: Dinosauria
- Clade: Saurischia
- Clade: Theropoda
- Family: †Coelophysidae
- Genus: †Pterospondylus; Jaekel, 1913
- Species: †P. trielbae

Binomial name
- †Pterospondylus trielbae Jaekel, 1913

= Pterospondylus =

Pterospondylus Temporal range: Norian ~216 Ma

Extinct genus of dinosaurs

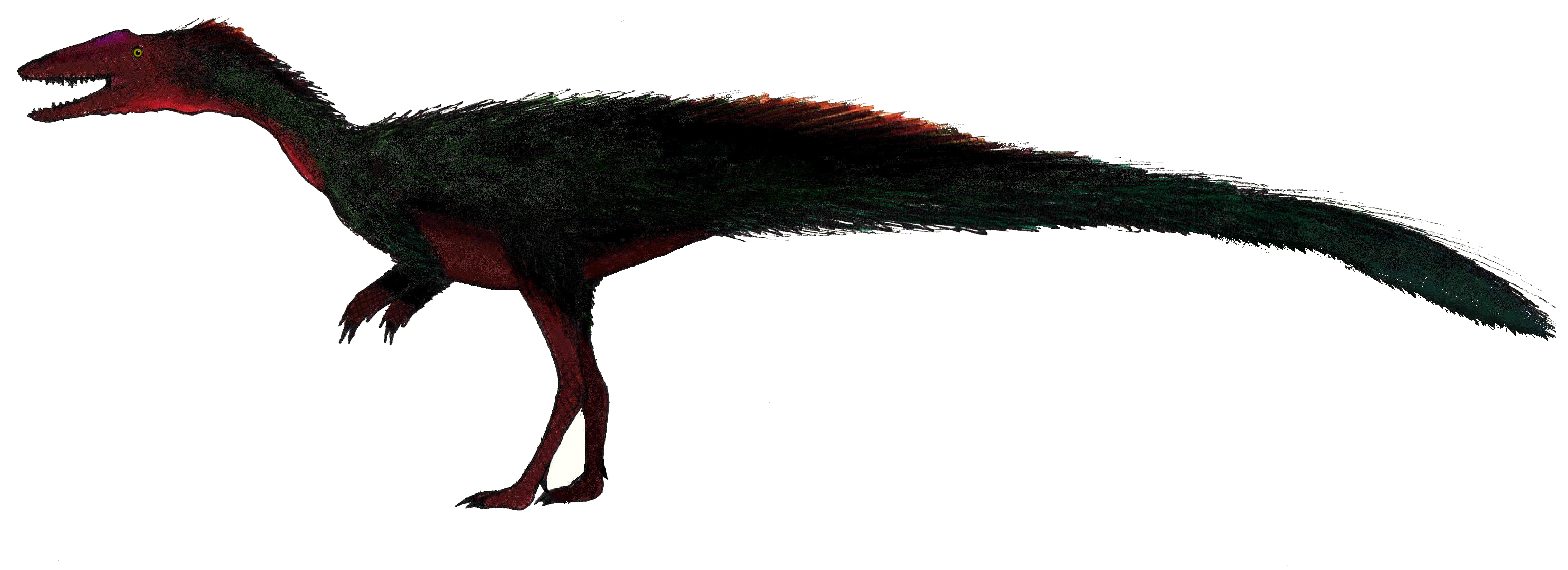
Restoration

Pterospondylus (meaning "winged vertebra") is a dubious genus of theropod dinosaur from the Late Triassic. It was a coelophysid theropod which lived in what is now Germany (Trossingen Formation). The type species, Pterospondylus trielbae, (derived from "Tri", in reference to the Triassic period, and "Elba", for the Elbe River area), was described by Jaekel in 1913–14 for a single back vertebra found inside the shell of the Proganochelys turtle. Sometimes, it is aligned with Procompsognathus, or even considered to be synonymous with it, despite being based on a vertebra that is twice the size of the corresponding bone in Procompsognathus. P. trielbae has no diagnostic features and is therefore considered a nomen dubium.
