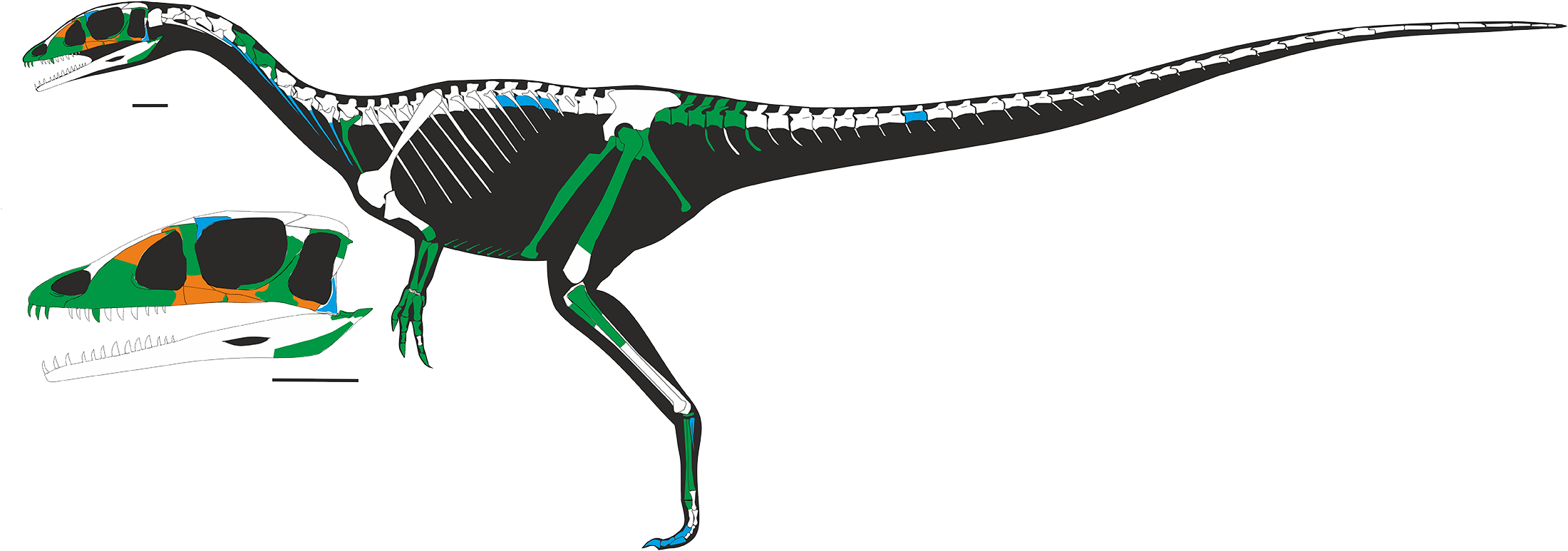
- Skeletal reconstruction, with present bones in green, external moulds in orange, and provisionally identified bones in blue

Scientific classification
- Kingdom: Animalia
- Phylum: Chordata
- Class: Reptilia
- Clade: Dinosauria
- Clade: Saurischia
- Clade: Theropoda
- Superfamily: †Coelophysoidea
- Genus: †Dracoraptor; Martill et al., 2016

Type species
- †Dracoraptor hanigani Martill et al., 2016

= Dracoraptor =

Dracoraptor Temporal range: Early Jurassic, 201–199 Ma

Genus of reptiles (fossil)

Dracoraptor (meaning "dragon thief") is a genus of coelophysoid dinosaur that lived during the Hettangian stage of the Early Jurassic Period of what is now Wales dated at about 201 million years ago. The fossil was first discovered in 2014 by Rob and Nick Hanigan and Sam Davies at the Blue Lias Formation on the South Wales coast. The genus name Dracoraptor is from Draco, referring to the Welsh dragon, and raptor, meaning robber, a commonly employed suffix for theropod dinosaurs, with the type species being Dracoraptor hanigani. It is one of the oldest known Jurassic dinosaurs and is the first dinosaur skeleton from the Jurassic of Wales.

== Discovery and naming ==
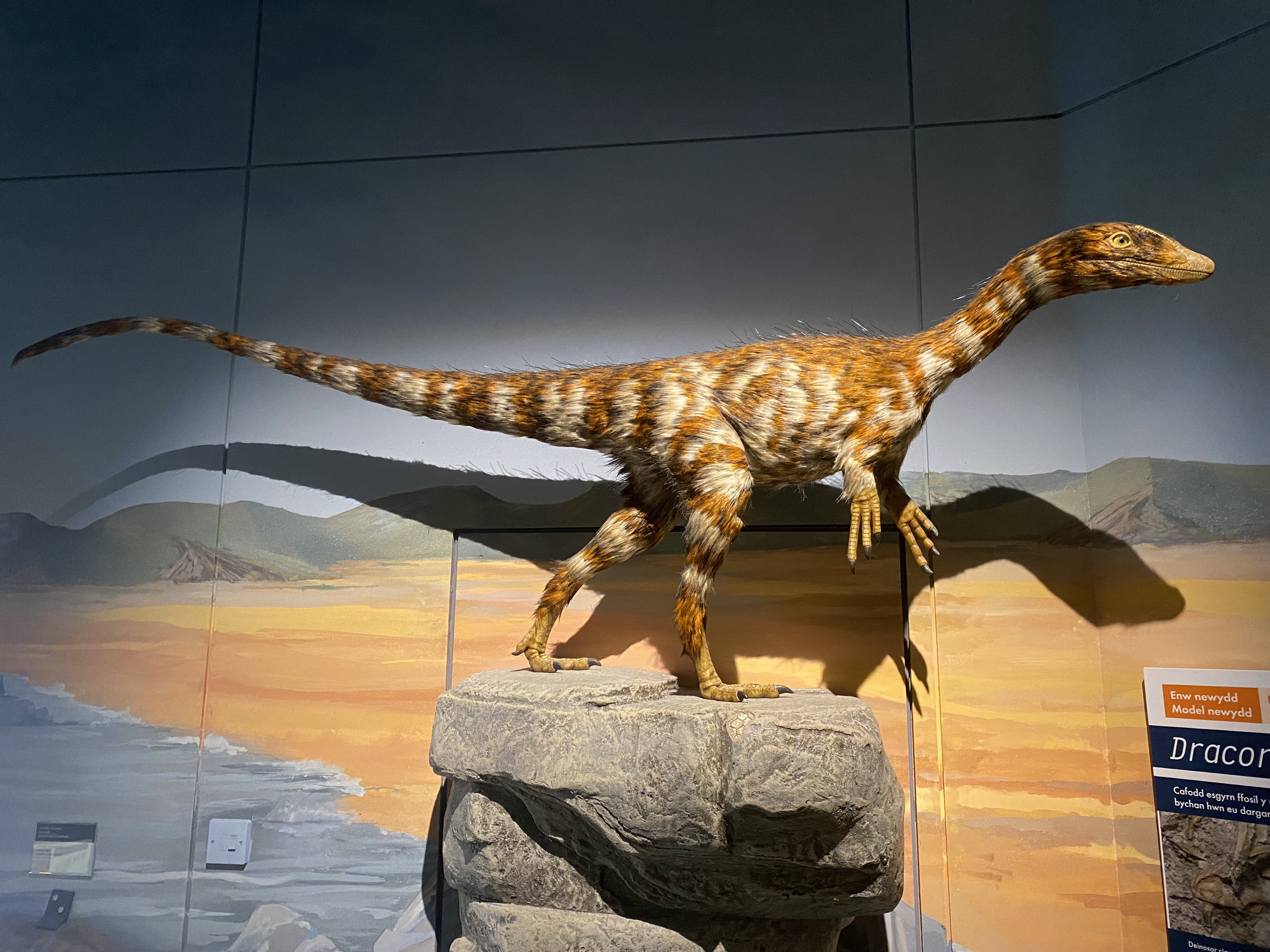
A lifesize model of a Dracoraptor at the National Museum Cardiff

The first Dracoraptor fossils were discovered in 2014 near the Welsh town of Penarth. In March 2014, brothers and amateur palaeontologists Nick and Rob Hanigan, while searching for ichthyosaur remains at Lavernock Point, a large cape south of Cardiff, found stone plates containing dinosaur fossils which had fallen off the 7-metre (23 ft) high cliff face. Judith Adams and Philip Manning of the University of Manchester took X-ray pictures and CAT-scans of the fossils. The remains were donated to Amgueddfa Cymru – Museum Wales, and prepared by Craig Chivers and Gary Blackwell. In 2015, student Sam Davies found additional rock plates at the dig site which contained foot bones assigned to Dracoraptor.

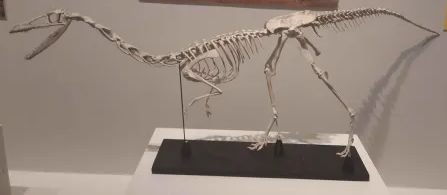
Reconstructed skeleton of Dracoraptor hanigani at the Worcester City Art Gallery & Museum

The type species, Dracoraptor hanigani, was named and described in 2016 by British palaeontologists David Martill, Steven Vidovic, Cindy Howells, and John Nudds. The generic name combines the Latin draco, "dragon", a reference to the Welsh Dragon, with raptor, "robber". The specific name honours Nick and Rob Hanigan as discoverers.

The holotype, NMW 2015.5G.1–2015.5G.11, was discovered in the lower Bull Cliff Member of the Blue Lias Formation in the United Kingdom. More precisely, it came from a layer just metres below the first occurrence of Jurassic ammonite Psiloceras and above the Paper Shales that represent the lithological Triassic-Jurassic boundary, precisely dating the dinosaur to the earliest Hettangian stage, 201.3 million years ago ± 0.2 million years.

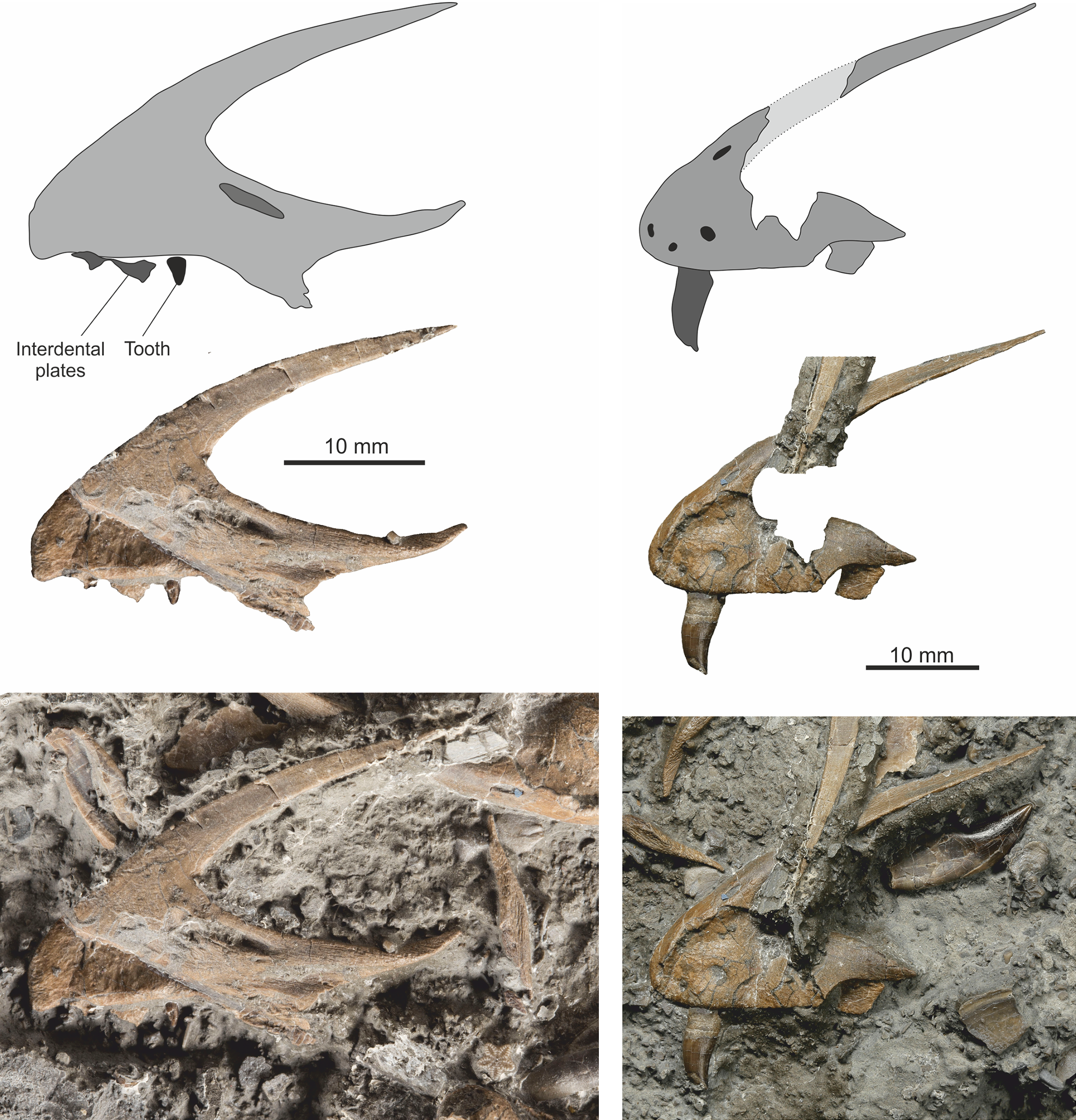
Right and left praemaxillae (frontmost upper jaw bones)

The holotype consists of a partial skeleton with skull. It contains both praemaxilla (frontmost upper jaw bones), both maxillae (main upper jaw bone), teeth, a lacrimal, a jugal, a postorbital, a squamosal, a supraoccipital, parts of the lower jaws, a possible hyoid, two cervical (neck) vertebrae (backbones), cervical ribs, rear dorsal (back) vertebrae, at least five front caudal (tail) vertebrae, chevrons, ribs, gastralia (or "belly ribs"), the lower parts of a left forelimb, a furcula (wishbone), both pubic bones, a left ischium (lower and rearmost hip bone), a right femur, a tibia (shin bone), the upper part of a fibula (calf bone), a left astragalus (ankle bone), three tarsals, and three metatarsals. About 40% of the skeleton is presented. Dracoraptor is thus the most complete Mesozoic non-bird theropod dinosaur known from Wales.

== Description ==
Size comparison of the juvenile holotype

=== Size and distinguishing traits ===
Dracoraptor was a biped, much like its relatives. The fossil discovered in Wales is a 2.1-metre (6.9 ft) juvenile with a hip height of 70 centimetres (28 in); adults may have been 3 m (9.8 ft) long.

In 2016, 18 autapomorphies (distinguishing traits) were established for Dracoraptor. The majority of these autapomorphies were convergent traits and had originated from other neotheropods. The Dracoraptor also possesses some plesiomorphic traits from ancestral species. The praemaxillae carried only three teeth, a basal trait. The jugal had a thin front branch running to the maxilla. The bony external nostril is large and had a thin branch beneath it. The pubic bone is obliquely directed to the front and is considerably longer than the ischium. The fourth tarsal had a process at the upper side.

=== Skeleton ===
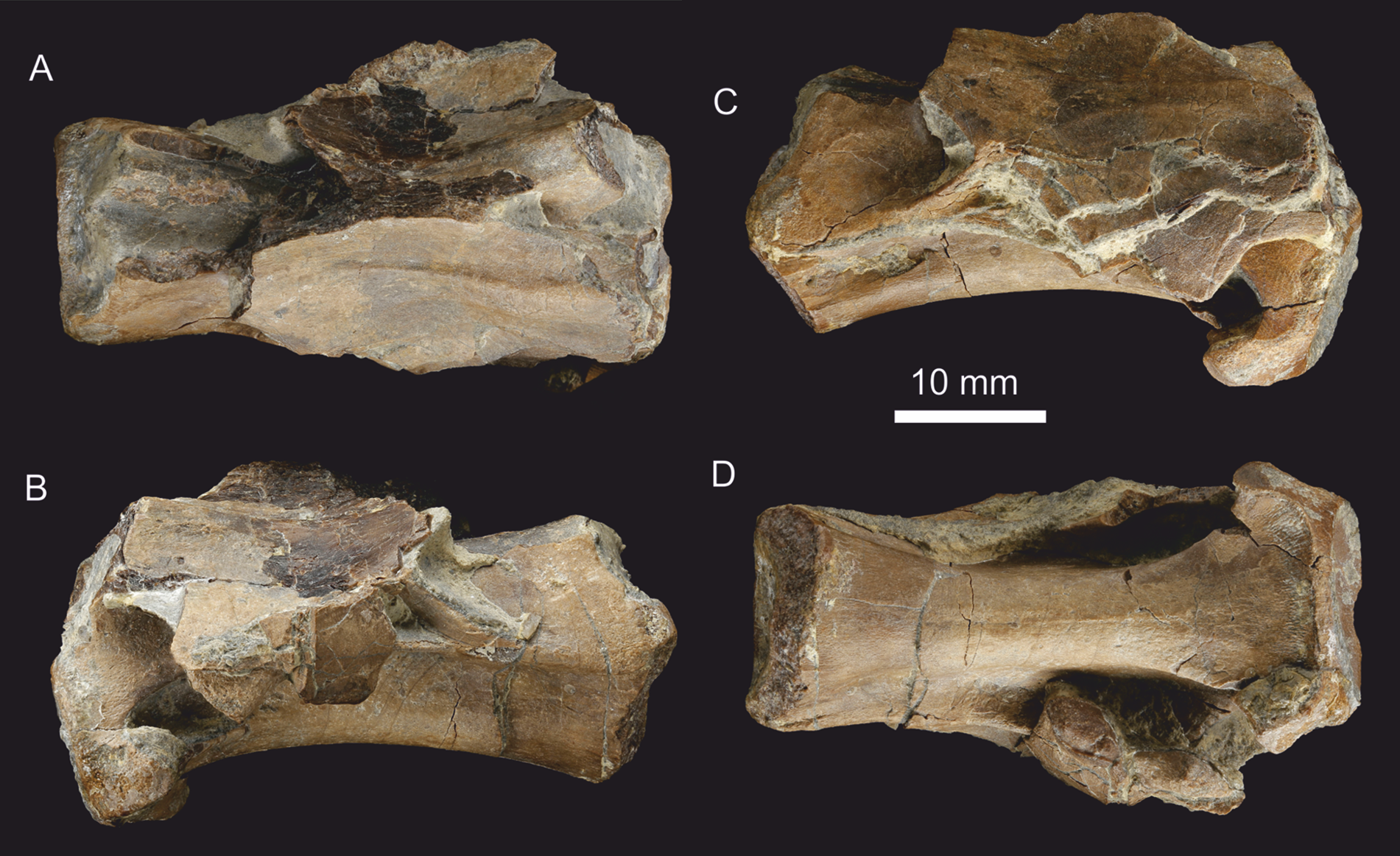
Cervical vertebrae

In the front of the snout each praemaxilla embraces the front of a very large nostril. The skull bears three praemaxillary teeth per side and at least seven maxillary teeth. The teeth are recurved or dagger-shaped. The edges of the tooth crown are serrated with six to eight denticles per millimetre (0.03 in). On the trailing edge these serrations run all the way to the root, on the leading edge they end at a higher position. Towards the tip of the tooth, these denticles become gradually somewhat smaller. The maxilla borders an antorbital fenestra with a shallow depression. The jugal is a slender element with a straight lower edge, a thin front branch overlapped by the rear branch of the maxilla and an ascending process towards the lacrimal that is thin but not pointed. The lacrimal is rectangular and pinched in the middle.

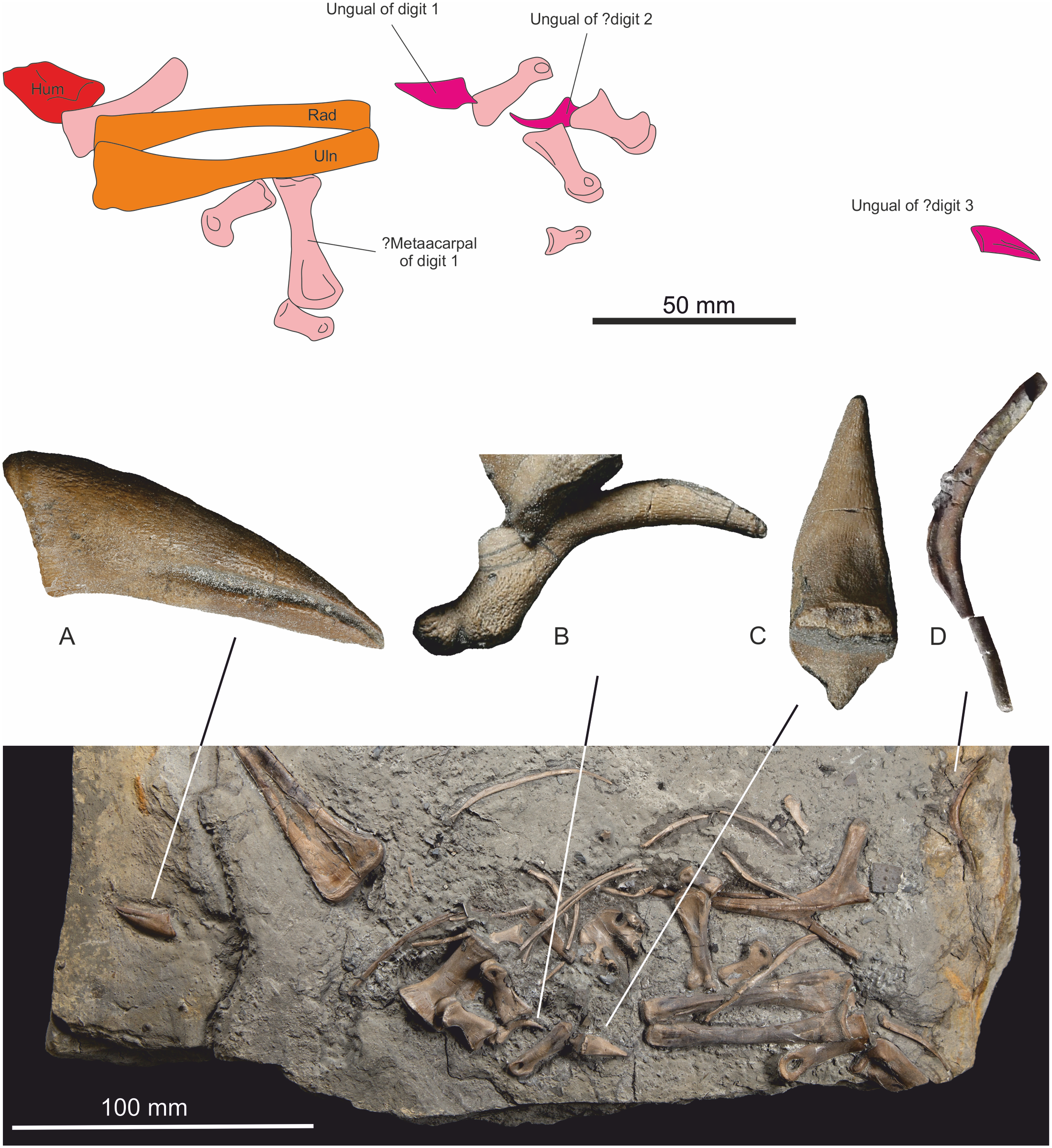
Hand elements and the furcula (wishbone) at the extreme right

The neck vertebrae are elongated, opisthocoelous, i.e. with a vertebral body that is convex in front and concave at the rear, and crowned by low neural spines. Their undersides are slightly convex and their cross-sections are rectangular. At the front side the vertebral body is pierced by a pleurocoel, a depression with a pneumatic opening for the air sac to enter the inside of the vertebra. The tail vertebrae had two parallel keels at their undersides, which peter out towards the front. Their side processes are flat and broad.

The presence of a furcula was reported. Furculae have only rarely been recovered from early theropod fossils; other examples include those of Segisaurus and Coelophysis. The lower arm bones, the ulna and the radius, had a length of about seven centimetres. Hand elements are present but a formula of the phalanges could not determined.

In the pelvis, the pubic bone had a length of 212 millimetres. It points obliquely to the front. The pubic foot is moderately broadened in side view, bot at the front and at the rear. The shaft of the ischium is with a length of 129 millimetres markedly shorter than the pubic shaft. On the upper front edge a rectangular obturator process is present, forming a clear obturator notch with the ischial shaft. The shaft fan out to below, into an ischial foot.

On the thighbone, the lesser trochanter had about two thirds of the height of the greater trochanter and is separated from it by a V-shaped cleft. A clear fourth trochanter is present. In the foot, the third metatarsal had a length of 116 millimetres.

== Classification ==
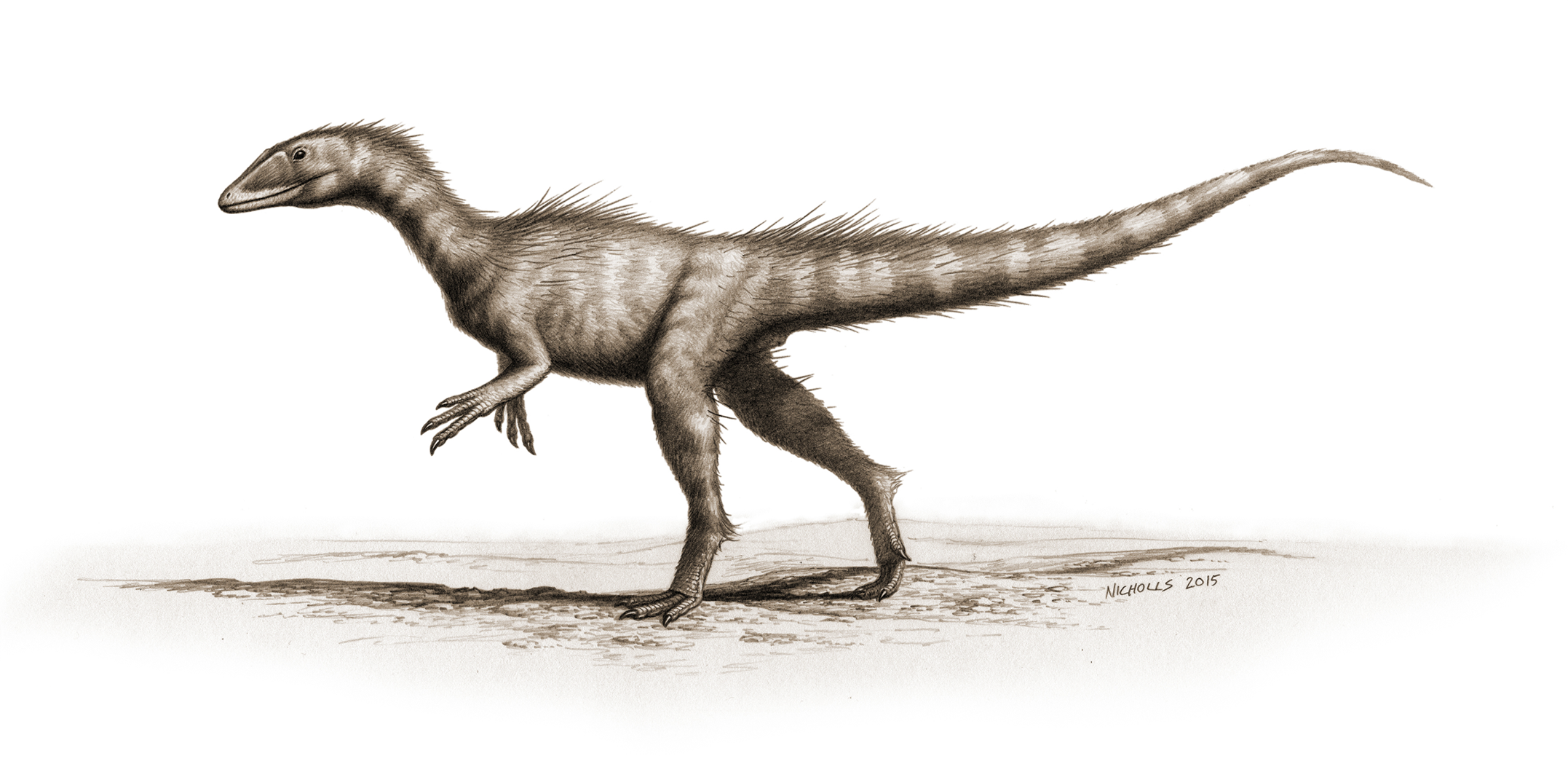
Life restoration

A cladistic analysis in 2016 determined that Dracoraptor was a basal member, positioned low in the evolutionary tree, of the Neotheropoda. It was the basalmost coelophysoid.

The precise affinities of Dracoraptor are indicated by its various traits. The build of the pelvis shows it was a saurischian dinosaur. Among dinosaurs, the dagger-shaped transversely flattened teeth are only found with Theropoda. A membership of the clade Neotheropoda is proven by the shallow depression around the antorbital fenestra, the forward position of a pleurocoel on the neck vertebrae and the presence of an obturator notch in the ischium. The position in the Coelophysoidea is more uncertain. Dracoraptor does not clearly share many of the synapomorphies of the group, such as a rounded jugal branch towards the lacrimal. This accounts for its basal position in the analysis. Further preparation of the fossils might provide additional information about its phylogeny.

== Paleobiology ==
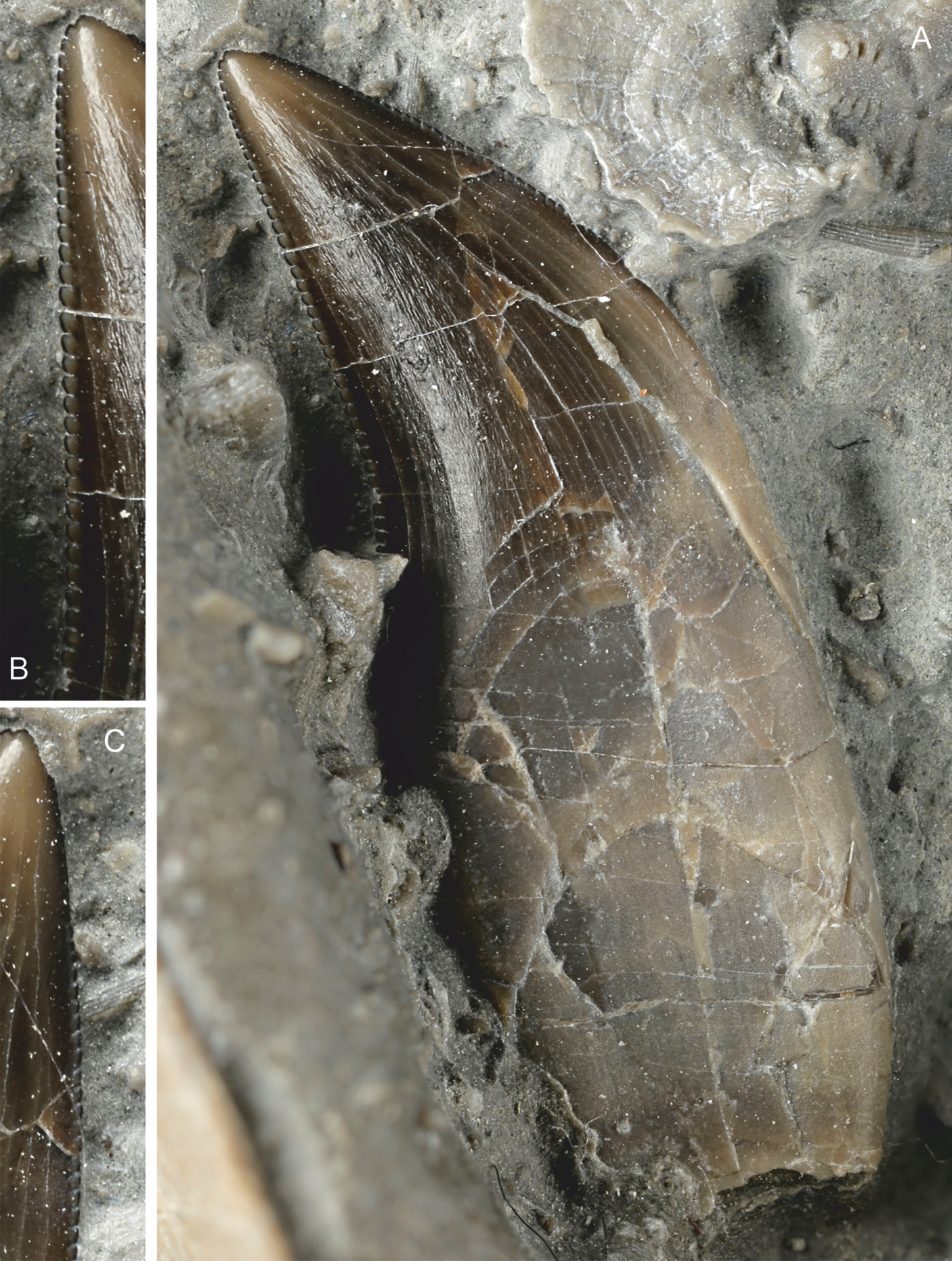
Close up of a tooth

At the end of the Triassic Period roughly half of Earth's species became extinct in the Triassic-Jurassic extinction event. This extinction event allowed dinosaurs to become the dominant land animals. The largest land predators at the end of the Triassic were Rauisuchia, large quadrupedal reptiles which disappeared in the extinction, paving the way for carnivorous dinosaurs to become the dominant land predators.

Dracoraptor had pointed and serrated teeth, indicating it was a meat-eater. But the teeth were small, about one centimetre long, showing it ate small vertebrate animals. The Dracoraptor would have been able to run at high speeds because of its small size and long legs. Its quickness would allow it to catch prey that would be too fast for larger predators. In the early Jurassic, South Wales was a coastal area with several small islands in a warm shallow sea. The area which is now Lavernock Point was offshore, so the cadaver of Dracoraptor had probably been washed into the sea from the land to the north. Despite the lack of data regarding its ecology, the authors in 2016 had it tentatively illustrated as a "shore-dwelling predator and scavenger".

Dracoraptor is the oldest known Jurassic dinosaur. Vidovic stated: "So this dinosaur starts to fill in some gaps in our knowledge about the dinosaurs that survived the Triassic extinction and gave rise to all the dinosaurs that we know from Jurassic Park, books and TV" and "Dinosaurs diversified and populated the ecological niches in the Early Jurassic."

== See also ==
- 2016 in paleontology
