= Powellvenator =

Powellvenator Temporal range: Norian ~221–206 Ma
- Size comparison of Powellvenator

Scientific classification
- Kingdom: Animalia
- Phylum: Chordata
- Class: Reptilia
- Clade: Dinosauria
- Clade: Saurischia
- Clade: Theropoda
- Superfamily: †Coelophysoidea
- Genus: †Powellvenator; Ezcurra 2017

Type species
- †Powellvenator podocitus Ezcurra 2017

Extinct genus of coelophysoid theropod dinosaurs

Powellvenator (meaning "Jaime Powell's hunter") is an extinct genus of coelophysoid theropod dinosaur that lived during the Late Triassic in what is now northwestern Argentina. Fossils of the dinosaur were found in the Los Colorados Formation of the Ischigualasto-Villa Unión Basin. The type and only known species is Powellvenator podocitus, named by Martín D. Ezcurra in 2017.

== Discovery and naming ==
Powellvenator podocitus was described in 2017 by Martín D. Ezcurra based on previously undescribed partial hindlimb remains from the Los Colorados Formation. Some of the referred material had earlier been interpreted by J. F. Bonaparte as belonging to an indeterminate coelurosaur, but was later reinterpreted by Ezcurra as belonging to the new taxon.

The generic name, Powellvenator, honours the Argentine paleontologist Jaime Powell, combined with the Latin venator ("hunter"). The specific name, podocitus, was established with the type species in the original description.

== Description ==
Powellvenator is known from fragmentary material, especially partial hindlimb bones, rather than from a complete skeleton. Because of this, many details of its full appearance, body proportions, and external covering remain uncertain.

Ezcurra diagnosed Powellvenator podocitus using a distinctive combination of ankle and foot characters, including an astragalus with a distinctly sigmoid posterodorsal margin, a rounded dorsal expansion on the anteromedial portion of the astragalar body in anterior view, a calcaneum with a laterally projected flange, and a strongly reduced shaft of metatarsal II.

== Classification ==
In its original description, Powellvenator was recovered within Coelophysoidea and as the sister taxon to Coelophysidae. Its description helped expand the South American record of early neotheropod dinosaurs, which had previously been far poorer than the record from North America and Europe.

== Paleoenvironment ==
Powellvenator lived during the Norian stage of the Late Triassic. The fossils come from the Los Colorados Formation, a unit known for preserving a diverse Late Triassic terrestrial fauna from Argentina.

== Gallery ==
Size comparison of Powellvenator

== See also ==
- 2017 in archosaur paleontology
- Coelophysoidea
- Los Colorados Formation
