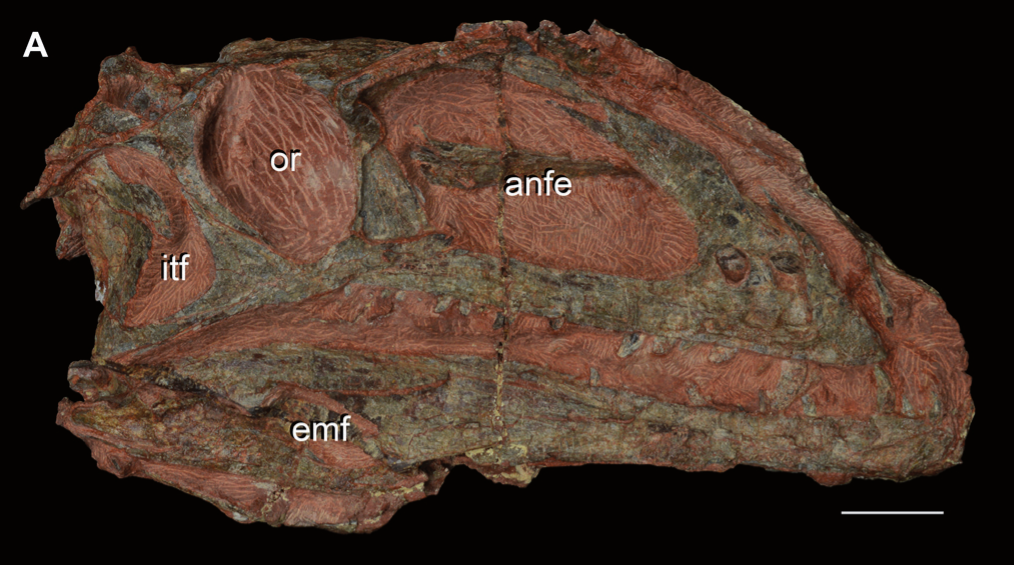
- The skull of Zupaysaurus as seen in right lateral view

Scientific classification
- Kingdom: Animalia
- Phylum: Chordata
- Class: Reptilia
- Clade: Dinosauria
- Clade: Saurischia
- Clade: Theropoda
- Clade: Averostriformes
- Genus: †Zupaysaurus; Arcucci & Coria 2003
- Species: †Z. rougieri

Binomial name
- †Zupaysaurus rougieri Arcucci & Coria 2003

= Zupaysaurus =

Zupaysaurus Temporal range: Norian, >213 Ma

Extinct genus of dinosaurs

Zupaysaurus (/ˌzuːpeɪˈsɔːrəs/; "ZOO-pay-SAWR-us") is an extinct genus of early theropod dinosaur which lived during the Norian stage of the Late Triassic in what is now Argentina. Fossils of the dinosaur were found in the Los Colorados Formation of the Ischigualasto-Villa Unión Basin in northwestern Argentina.

Although a full skeleton has not yet been discovered, Zupaysaurus can be considered a bipedal predator, up to 4 metres (13 ft) long. Originally described as having a pair of tall narrow crests on its skull, a later study argued that the "crests" are misplaced bones, and that Zupaysaurus probably had low ridges along the edge of its snout instead.

== Discovery ==
Discovered in May 1997 by Santiago Reuil ("Vultur"), part of the crew of Guillermo Rougier, it was later described by Arcucci and Coria and published in 2003. The name Zupaysaurus is composed of the Quechua word supay meaning "devil" and the Greek word sauros (σαυρος) meaning "lizard"; thus "devil lizard". In Incan mythology, supay was both the god of death and ruler of the ukhu pacha, the Incan underworld. The type species was named Z. rougieri in the honor of Guillermo Rougier, the scientist who led the expedition which discovered and collected the holotype (original specimen) PULR-076. Zupaysaurus was first described and named in the scientific journal Ameghiniana by Argentine paleontologists Andrea Arcucci and Rodolfo Coria in 2003. The original specimen is from the upper part of the Los Colorados Formation, at least 213 million years old (from the late Norian stage of the Late Triassic).

Only one specimen of Zupaysaurus, the holotype, is confirmed to belong to the genus. Designated PULR-076, it consists of a nearly complete skull, the right shoulder girdle, the lower right leg and ankle, and twelve vertebrae from the neck, back, and hips. Additional material of a smaller individual found at the same site may or may not belong to Zupaysaurus. The skull's degree of preservation is good enough that it preserves a braincase, allowing for a reconstruction of Zupaysaurus's brain anatomy via a digital endocast.

== Description ==
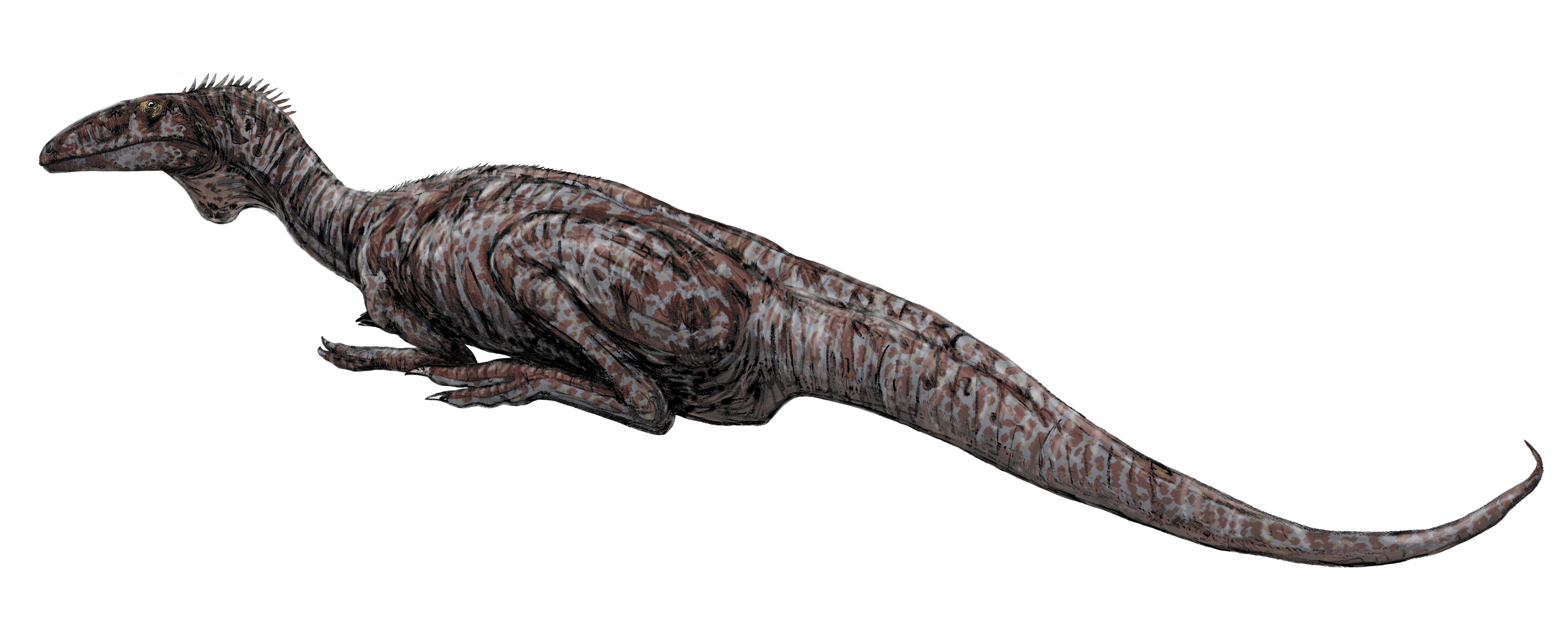
Life restoration of Zupaysaurus in a resting pose

Zupaysaurus was a medium-sized theropod. An adult skull, measured approximately 450 mm (18 in) in length, suggesting a body length of approximately 4 m (13 ft) from its snout to the tip of its tail. In 2010, Gregory S. Paul estimateda length of 6 meters (20 ft) and a weight of 250 kg (550 lbs). In 2016 it was given a much smaller size of 4.2 meters (14 ft) and 70 kg (154 lbs). Like all theropods, Zupaysaurus walked only on its hindlegs, leaving its forelimbs free to grasp its prey. The length of the neck bones recovered suggests that this genus has a rather long neck.

=== Skull ===
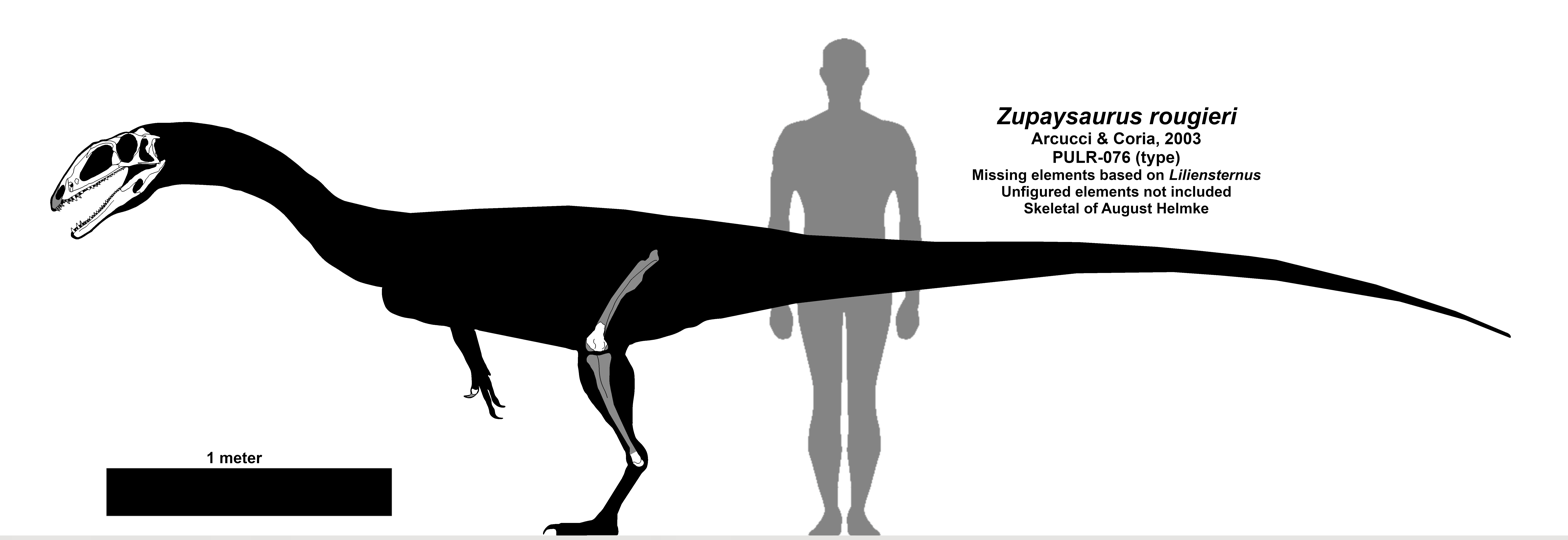
Skeletal reconstruction, with known remains in white

Like the coelophysoids, Zupaysaurus has a kink in its snout, between the toothed premaxillary and maxillary bones of the upper jaw. It is estimated that Zupaysaurus had 24 teeth and an intermandibular hinge in the lower jaw. Arcucci and Coria (2003) originally described Zupaysaurus as having two thin parallel crests on top of the skull, similar to theropods like Dilophosaurus and Coelophysis kayentakatae. These crests were thought to have been formed by the nasal bones solely, unlike those of many other theropods which also incorporated the lacrimal bones. Crests on the skull were pervasive among theropods and may have been used for communicative purposes such as species or gender recognition.

However, later analysis of the skull cast doubt on the presence of crests in Zupaysaurus. A skull redescription by Ezcurra (2007) identified the "crests" as a displaced right nasal bone, flipped over so its underside is visible in right lateral view. Other cranial ornamentation included a rough lacrimal ridge projecting outwards from the upper edge of the skull. In their original position, the nasal bones would have formed a flat upper edge of the snout, with rough lateral ridges, continuous with the lacrimal ridges.

A diagnosis is a statement of the anatomical features of an organism (or group) that collectively distinguish it from all other organisms. Some, but not all, of the features in a diagnosis are also autapomorphies. An autapomorphy is a distinctive anatomical feature that is unique to a given organism or group. According to Ezcurra (2007) and Ezcurra and Novas (2007), Zupaysaurus can be distinguished based on the following characteristics:

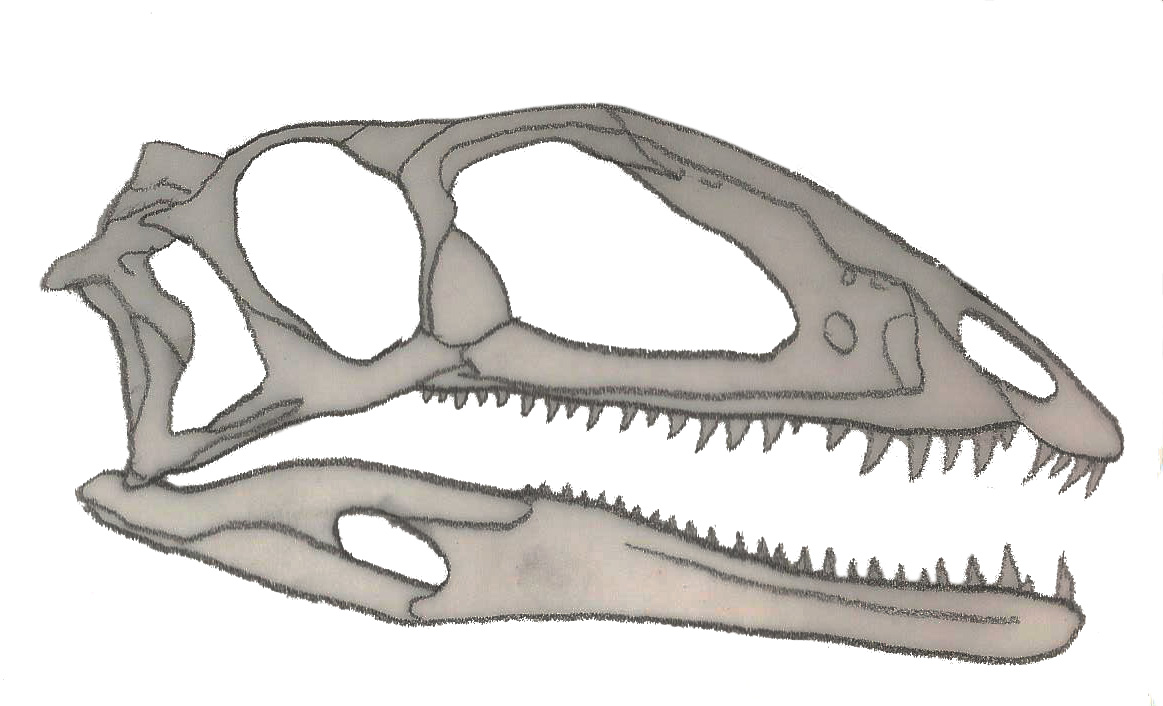
Skull diagram based on the corrections made by Ezcurra (2007)

- The maxillary fenestra (a hole at the front of the maxilla) is within the antorbital fossa (a lowered surface occupying most of the maxilla)
- The rostral process (front branch) of the lacrimal is ventrally bowed (curved down).
- The ventral process (lower branch) of the squamosal is kinked.
- Wide contact between the squamosal and quadratojugal.
- The maxillary-jugal ventral margin (lower edge) describes an obtuse (rather than straight) angle in lateral view.
- The horizontal ramus (rear lower branch) of the maxilla has parallel dorsal and ventral margins, giving Zupaysaurus an oval-shaped antorbital fenestra.
- A notch on the dorsal margin of the ascending process (upper branch) of the maxilla, relating to the horizontal ramus of the lacrimal, is rostrally tapering onto the forked caudal tip of the ascending process of the maxilla.
- The lacrimal has a highly pneumatized antorbital recess
- The mandible (lower jaw) has a short and square-shaped retroarticular process (the portion behind the jaw joint).
- The cnemial crest (a ridge at the front of the shin, near the knee) is poorly developed.

== Classification ==
Zupaysaurus was originally classified as the earliest known tetanuran theropod due to several features of its skull, dentition, and hindlimb. However, several features typical of more basal theropods were also noted by the original authors. Analyses by Carano (2005), Tykoski (2005), and Ezcurra and Novas (2005) have classified Zupaysaurus as a coelophysoid related to Segisaurus and probably Liliensternus, though more basal than Coelophysis. Yates (2006) found Zupaysaurus to form a group with Dilophosaurus and Dracovenator, placing it in a monophyletic Dilophosauridae. But later studies found Zupaysaurus to be a sister taxon sister to a clade containing dilophosaurids, ceratosaurs and tetanurans.

Below is a cladogram based on the phylogenetic analysis conducted by Sues et al. in 2011, showing the relationships of Zupaysaurus:

- Theropoda
  - Herrerasauridae
    - Staurikosaurus
    - - Herrerasaurus
      - Chindesaurus
  - - Eoraptor
    - - Daemonosaurus
      - - Tawa
        - Neotheropoda
          - Coelophysidae
            - Coelophysis
          - - Liliensternus
            - - Zupaysaurus
              - - Cryolophosaurus
                - - Dilophosaurus
                  - Jurassic theropods (which include ceratosaurs and tetanurans)

== Paleoecology ==
Zupaysaurus was discovered in red siliciclastic sediments at the "Quebrada de los Jachaleros" locality within the Los Colorados Formation of the La Rioja province in Argentina. This formation has been shown by magnetostratigraphy to date to the Norian stage of the Late Triassic period, approximately 228 to 208 million years ago. A 1998 study assigned it to the slightly younger Rhaetian stage, which was approximately 208 to 201 million years ago. More precise dating estimates constrain the Los Colorados Formation between 227 and 213 million years ago, with Zupaysaurus and its contemporary fauna in the upper part of the formation. Both specimens assigned to this genus are housed in the collection of the National University of La Rioja in La Rioja, Argentina.

The Los Colorados Formation was interpreted as an ancient floodplain and it was home to several types of early sauropodomorph dinosaurs (including Riojasaurus, Coloradisaurus, and Lessemsaurus), all of which shared the same paleoenvironment with Zupaysaurus. It is recognized as one of the earliest known faunal assemblages dominated by dinosaurs, which were 43% of the number of tetrapod species currently known. The non-dinosaurs that inhabited this locality included pseudosuchians, therapsids like Cynodontia, other early reptiles, and possible archosaurs.
