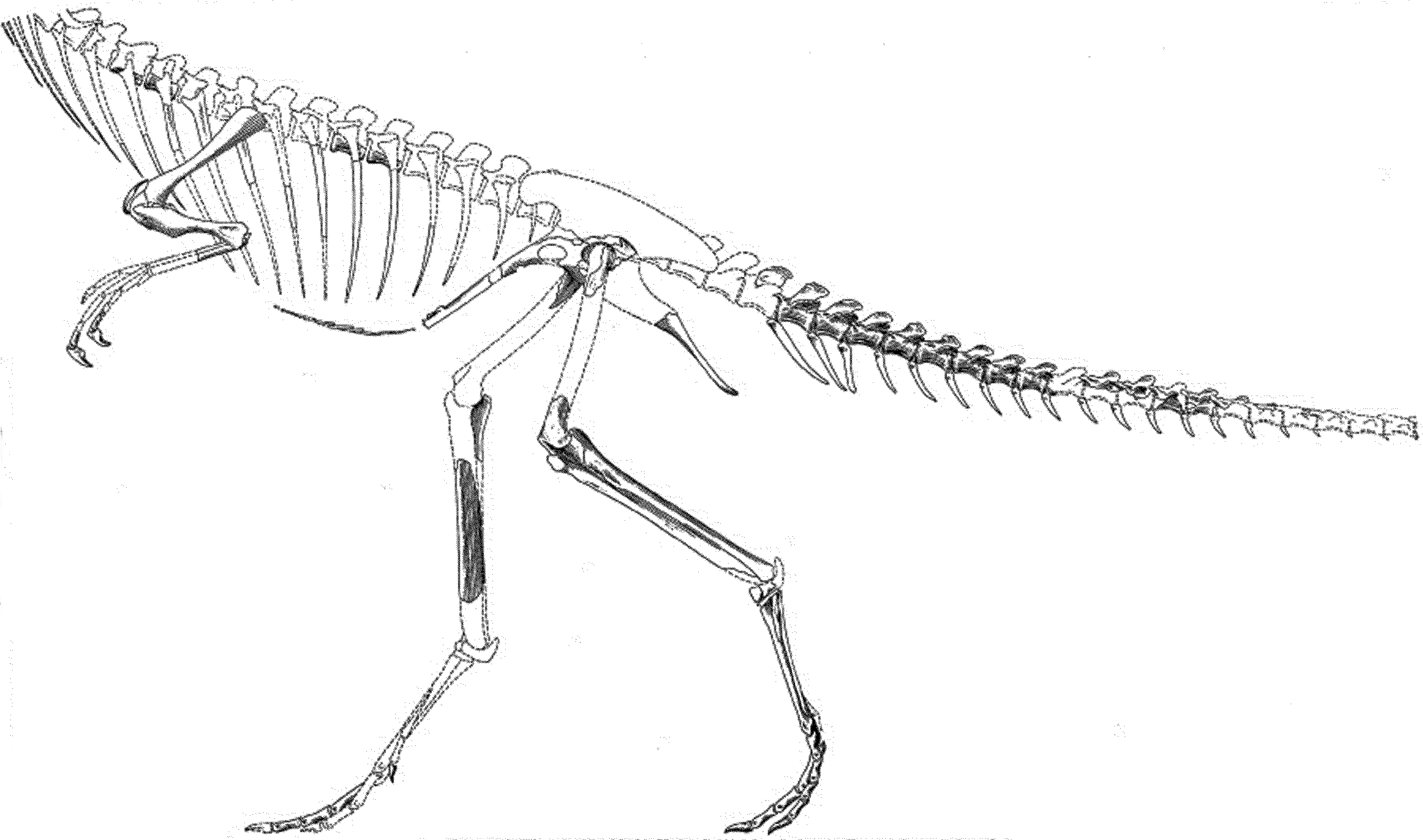
- Restoration of the holotype skeleton from 1936

Scientific classification
- Kingdom: Animalia
- Phylum: Chordata
- Class: Reptilia
- Clade: Dinosauria
- Clade: Saurischia
- Clade: Theropoda
- Family: †Coelophysidae
- Genus: †Segisaurus; Camp, 1936

Type species
- †Segisaurus halli Camp, 1936

= Segisaurus =

Segisaurus Temporal range: Early Jurassic

Extinct genus of dinosaurs

Segisaurus (meaning "Tsegi Canyon lizard") is a genus of small coelophysid theropod dinosaur, that measured approximately 1 metre (3.3 feet) in length. The only known specimen was discovered in early Jurassic strata in Tsegi Canyon, Arizona, for which it was named. Segisaurus is the only dinosaur to have ever been excavated from the area.

== Description ==
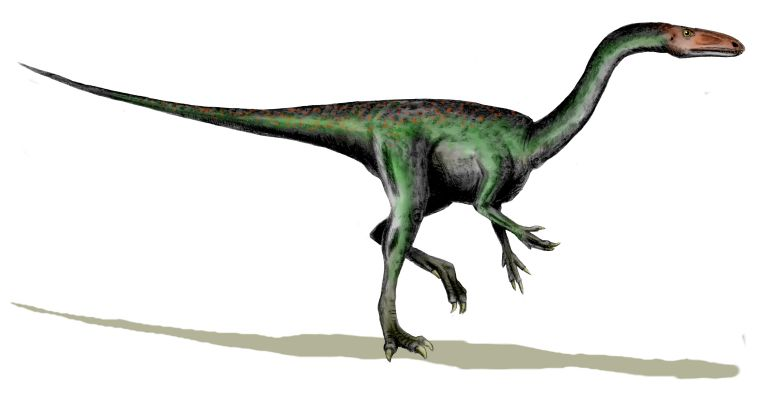
Restoration

Segisaurus lived sometime between ~200 and 195 million years ago during the Jurassic period. It was a primitive bipedal theropod roughly around the size of a goose. Segisaurus was 1 meter (3.3 feet) long, half a meter (1.65 feet) tall and weighed about 4-7 kilograms. It was nimble and insectivorous, although it may have scavenged meat also. It was bird-like in structure, with a flexible, elongated neck and stout body. Segisaurus was three-toed and had powerful legs that were long compared to its body length. Like its legs, Segisaurus had a long tail and long forearms. Its furcula bone was not unlike a bird's, thus strengthening scientists' arguments that dinosaurs were related to avians. Segisaurus is described from the only specimen ever found, the holotype UCMP 32101, which was a sub-adult. The full size of Segisaurus as an adult may never be known. Furculae were found in the Segisaurus specimen, making it one of the first known non-avian dinosaurs to preserve furculae found. These furculae were initially thought to be clavicles, which led Charles Lewis Camp to speculate that the "splint-like" neck ribs supported a Draco-like patagium along the neck, to improve the animal's ability to move quickly. Segisaurus is significant because it demonstrates that the furcula was primitively present in early theropods.

== Classification ==
Size comparison

Segisaurus was described in 1936 by the paleontologist Charles Lewis Camp, based on specimen UCMP 32101, a fragmentary fossil skeleton which consisted of portions of the limbs, pelvis, and vertebrae. Cranial material was not recovered. Segisaurus went relatively ignored for the next half century. When the specimen was examined during this period, all who viewed it commented on the supposed presence of clavicles and the apparently "solid" bones that the dinosaur had. Segisaurus appeared to be closely related to the better-known Coelophysis, but unlike the hollow bones of Coelophysis, Segisaurus had solid bones. This caused some scientists question whether Segisaurus was a theropod at all. In 2005, a re-examination of the Segisaurus holotype revealed that contrary to reports it did in fact have hollow bones and that the clavicles were instead fragmented furculae. In this study, Carano et al. found that although it was very unusual, Segisaurus was firmly a coelophysoid, and probably a close relative of Procompsognathus.

=== Distinguishing anatomical features ===
A diagnosis is a statement of the anatomical features of an organism (or group) that collectively distinguish it from all other organisms. Some, but not all, of the features in a diagnosis are also autapomorphies. An autapomorphy is a distinctive anatomical feature that is unique to a given organism or group.

According to Rauhut (2003), Segisaurus can be distinguished based on the following features:

- the dorsal centra are not very constricted ventrally
- the scapula is slender
- the humeral shaft has stronger torsion (~50 degrees) than does that of Coelophysis
- the presence of a large ischial fenestra (according to Carrano et al., 2005)
- the humeral deltopectoral crest is rectangular

== History of discovery ==
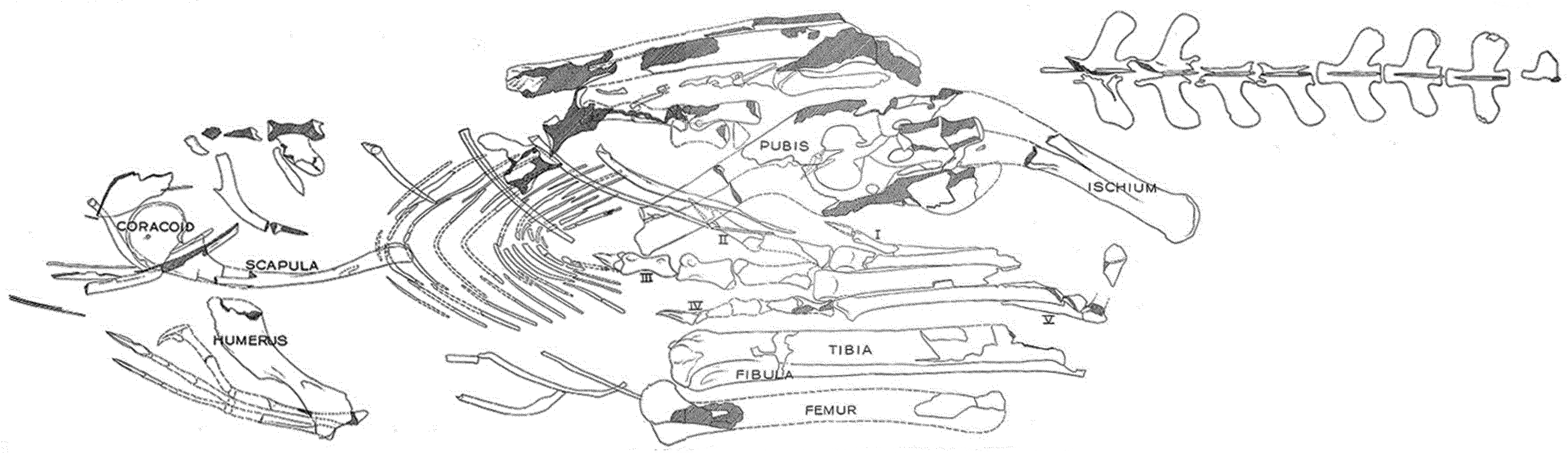
Illustration of the holotype skeleton, shown as it was found

In 1933, Max Littlesalt, a Navajo Indian, discovered the holotype in Tsegi Canyon of the Navajo Sandstone of Coconino County, Arizona. The specimen was found in calcareous sandstone, which was deposited during the Pliensbachian - Toarcian stages of the Jurassic, approximately 190 to 174 million years ago. After discovering the remains, Littlesalt, who kept livestock inside the canyon, pointed out the fossils to archeologists who were on an expedition inside the canyon. Other than the first finding of Segisaurus, no other specimens have been discovered.

When the specimen of Segisaurus was discovered, Camp likened its posture to that of a "sitting hen", due to the position the dinosaur's remains were in. Other theropods used this positions to sleep or stay sheltered during sand and ash storms.

== Taphonomy ==
The Segisaurus holotype was found in a bed of sandstone, suggesting that the dinosaur had been buried in a layer of sand and died. This is still only a hypothesis, as no nest or den materials were discovered with the specimen. Geological features of the Navajo Sandstone Formation suggest that this genus lived in an environment resembling modern sand dunes.
