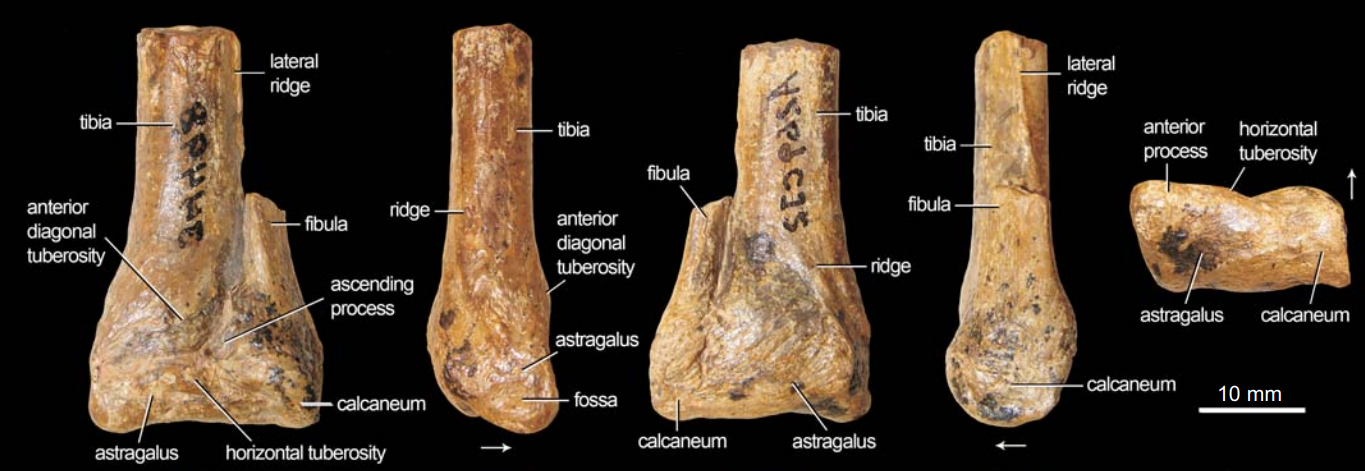
- Lower leg and ankle bones of the holotype in multiple views

Scientific classification
- Kingdom: Animalia
- Phylum: Chordata
- Class: Reptilia
- Clade: Dinosauria
- Clade: Saurischia
- Clade: Theropoda
- Family: †Coelophysidae
- Genus: †Camposaurus; Hunt et al., 1998

Type species
- †Camposaurus arizonensis Hunt et al., 1998

= Camposaurus =

Camposaurus Temporal range: Late Triassic, middle Norian, 220 Ma

Extinct genus of dinosaurs

Camposaurus (/ˌkæmpoʊˈsɔːrəs, -pə-/ KAMP-o-SOR-əs) is a coelophysid dinosaur genus from the Norian stage of the Late Triassic period of North America. The pertinent fossil remains date back to the early to middle Norian stage, and is widely regarded as the oldest known neotheropod.

== Description ==
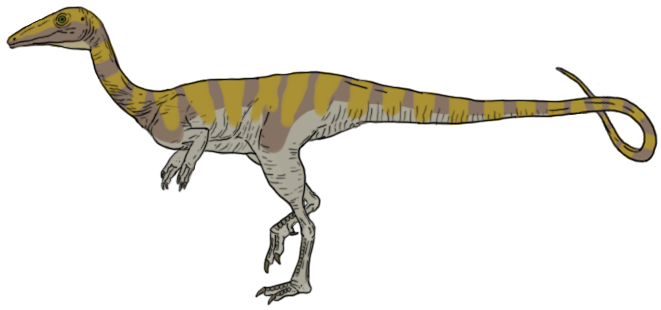
Reconstruction based on Coelophysis

Camposaurus is a small, carnivorous, theropod dinosaur. Camposaurus is known from partial lower leg bones, holotype UCMP 34498 (which includes distal tibiae, distal fibulae, and astragalocalcanea), and other fragmentary material. Like other coelophysids, it has fused tibio-tarsals and fibulo-tarsals. Unlike its relatives, the area of the tibia that fits with the fibula has a distinct ridge at the back. Another unique feature is the lack of a large medial condyle on the astragalus. The type species, C. arizonensis, was formally named and described by Adrian Hunt, Spencer G. Lucas, Andrew B. Heckert, Robert M. Sullivan and Martin Lockley in 1998. The genus name means "Camp's lizard", after Charles Lewis Camp. The species name refers to the fact it was found in Arizona, in the United States. Camposaurus has been estimated at 3 metres (9.8 ft) in length.

== Discovery ==
The holotype specimen UCMP 34498 was discovered in the Placerias quarry of the Bluewater Creek Formation of Arizona, from the Norian stage of the Late Triassic period in 1934, It wasn't named until 1998 by Hunt and colleagues. Hunt et al. included many remains also from Placerias quarry as paratypes, but due to the lack of association in the large bonebed, this was disregarded.

== Classification ==
Camposaurus is considered to be one of the oldest, if not the oldest, known neotheropod dinosaur. Camposaurus was originally placed in the clade Ceratosauria based on the analysis of Long and Murray (1995). It is morphologically similar to, and was incorrectly considered for some time to be a species of, Coelophysis. In 2000, Downs examined Camposaurus and concluded that it is a junior synonym of Coelophysis, because of its similarity to some of the Coelophysis Ghost Ranch specimens. The review by Nesbitt et al. in 2007, revealed that a specific feature of the ankle (the ventral astragalar margin) was found to be straight, and is indistinguishable from that of Coelophysis bauri. Based on this Nesbitt et al. (2007) concluded that the two genera were synonymous. In 2011, it was entered into a phylogenetic analysis and found to be a close relative of Megapnosaurus rhodesiensis. The lack of material has led many paleontologists to reject it as a nomen dubium. A reassessment of the holotype UCMP 34498 of Camposaurus arizoniensis by Ezcurra and Brusatte revealed two autapomorphies, thereby firmly establishing this material as a valid genus and species. This analysis also demonstrated that Camposaurus is definitely a neotheropod, and based on phylogenetic analysis its closest known relative is Megapnosaurus rhodesiensis, because they share similarities in the tibia, and ankle. The synonymy with Coelophysis was found to be unsupported in 2017 when in a phylogenetic analysis by Ezcurra, Camposaurus was found to be in a clade with Megapnosaurus, Segisaurus, and also Lucianovenator by Martinez & Apaldetti later that year.

=== Distinguishing anatomical features ===
A diagnosis is a statement of the anatomical features of an organism (or group) that collectively distinguish it from all other organisms. Some, but not all, of the features in a diagnosis are also autapomorphies. An autapomorphy is a distinctive anatomical feature that is unique to a given organism or group.

According to Ezcurra and Brusatte (2011), Camposaurus can be distinguished based on the following features:

- the caudal ridge of the tibia articular surface on the fibula is prominent, taking the form of a sharp longitudinal ridge, the medial surface having a strongly developed, rostrally bowed, diagonal tuberosity
- the astragalus is without a strong cranial projection of the medial condyle of the astragalar body, resulting in a sub-rectangular astragalar body in the distal aspect, and a ventral margin that is incipiently concave in the cranial aspect
