= 1932 in paleontology =

List of years in paleontology	(table)
- … 1922; 1923; 1924; 1925; 1926; 1927; 1928; 1929; 1930; 1931; 1932; 1933; 1934; 1935; 1936; 1937; 1938; 1939; 1940; 1941; 1942 …
- In science 1929 1930 1931 1932 1933 1934 1935
- Art; Archaeology; Architecture; Literature; Music; Philosophy; Science; +...

Paleontology or palaeontology is the study of prehistoric life forms on Earth through the examination of plant and animal fossils. This includes the study of body fossils, tracks (ichnites), burrows, cast-off parts, fossilised feces (coprolites), palynomorphs and chemical residues. Because humans have encountered fossils for millennia, paleontology has a long history both before and after becoming formalized as a science. This article records significant discoveries and events related to paleontology that occurred or were published in the year 1932.

== Paleobotany ==
=== Newly described angiosperms ===
Name	Novelty	Status	Authors	Age	Unit	Location	Notes	Images
Viburnum whitebirdensis	Sp nov	jr synonym	Ashlee	Middle Miocene	Latah Formation; White Bird Florule	USA; Idaho	First described as a Viburnum; Moved to Acer whitebirdense (1987)	

== Arthropods ==
=== Newly named crustaceans ===
Name	Novelty	Status	Authors	Age	Type locality	Location	Notes	Images
Palaeophoberus	Gen. et. comb. nov.	Valid	Glaessner	Middle Jurassic (Aalenian)	Reutlingen	Germany	A stenochirid, type species is P. suevicus (originally named as Stenochirus suevicus in 1867.	

== Conodonts ==
=== Newly named conodonts ===
Stauffer & Plummer described the conodont genus Gondolella.

== Archosauromorphs ==
=== Newly named basal archosauromorphs ===
Name	Status	Authors	Age	Unit	Location	Notes	Images
Spinosuchus	Valid	Friedrich von Huene	Late Triassic (late Carnian)	Tecovas Formation	US (Texas)	A member of Trilophosauridae.	

=== Newly named pseudosuchians ===
Name	Status	Authors	Location	Notes	Images
Basutodon	Nomen dubium.	Friedrich von Huene	Lesotho; South Africa	Probable rauisuchian.	

=== Newly named dinosaurs ===
Data courtesy of George Olshevsky's dinosaur genera list.

Name	Status	Authors	Age	Unit	Location	Notes	Images
Aegyptosaurus	Valid taxon	Stromer	Middle Cretaceous (Cenomanian)	Bahariya Formation	Egypt; Niger	A titanosaur.	
Betasuchus	Nomen dubium.	Friedrich von Huene	Late Cretaceous (Maastrichtian)	Maastrichtian Beds	Netherlands	An abelisaur. It one of the few non-avian dinosaurs in the Netherlands.	
Caudocoelus	synonym	Friedrich von Huene	Late Jurassic (Kimmeridgian)	Unnamed unit	France	Junior objective synonym of Teinurosaurus.	
Dolichosuchus	Nomen dubium.	Friedrich von Huene	Late Triassic (Rhaetian)	Middle Stubensandstein	Germany		
Fulgurotherium	Valid taxon	Friedrich von Huene	Middle Cretaceous (late Albian)	Griman Creek Formation	Australia	A dubious ornithopod.	
Iliosuchus	Nomen dubium	Friedrich von Huene	Middle Jurassic (Bathonian)	Taynton Limestone Formation	UK	A dubious tetanuran.	
Macrophalangia	synonym	C. M. Sternberg	Late Cretaceous (middle to late Campanian)	Dinosaur Park Formation	Canada	Junior subjective synonym of Chirostenotes.	
Magnosaurus	Valid taxon	Friedrich von Huene	Middle Jurassic (Bajocian)	Inferior Oolite	UK	A megalosaurid.	
Magyarosaurus	Valid taxon	Friedrich von Huene	Late Cretaceous (Maastrichtian)	Sanpetru Formation	Romania	A Dwarf Titanosaur.	
Plateosauravus	Valid taxon	Friedrich von Huene	Late Triassic (possibly late Norian to Rhaetian)	Lower Elliot Formation	South Africa	A basal sauropodomorph.	
Polyodontosaurus	synonym	Gilmore	Late Cretaceous (middle to late Campanian)	Dinosaur Park Formation	Canada	Junior subjective synonym of Troodon.	
Rapator	Nomen dubium.	Friedrich von Huene	Middle Cretaceous (late Albian)	Griman Creek Formation	Australia	A megaraptoran neovenatorid.	
Stenonychosaurus	Valid taxon	C. M. Sternberg	Late Cretaceous (middle to late Campanian)	Dinosaur Park Formation	Canada	Once considered to be a junior synonym of Troodon.	
Walgettosuchus	Nomen dubium.	Friedrich von Huene	Middle Cretaceous (late Albian)	Griman Creek Formation	Australia	A dubious theropod.	
Yaleosaurus	synonym	Friedrich von Huene	Early Jurassic	Portland Formation	US	Junior subjective synonym of Anchisaurus.	

== Other diapsids ==
Name	Status	Authors	Location	Images
Avipes	Nomen dubium.	Friedrich von Huene		
Velocipes	Nomen dubium.	Friedrich von Huene	Poland	

== Synapsids ==
=== Non-mammalian ===
Name	Status	Authors	Age	Unit	Location	Notes	Images
Delphaciognathus	Valid	Broom				A member of Gorgonopsia.	
Pachytegos	Valid	Sidney Haughton				A member of Endothiodontidae.	
