= Compy =

Compy may refer to:

- An abbreviation, slang term or pet name for a computer
- The shortened form of Procompsognathus, as used in the book Jurassic Park
- Compy 386, a computer in the comedy web series Homestar Runner
