= Tanystrosuchus =

Tanystrosuchus Temporal range: Norian ~208 Ma

Scientific classification
- Kingdom: Animalia
- Phylum: Chordata
- Class: Reptilia
- Clade: Dinosauria
- Clade: Saurischia
- Clade: Theropoda
- Genus: †Tanystrosuchus; Kuhn, 1963
- Species: †T. posthumus

Binomial name
- †Tanystrosuchus posthumus (Huene, 1908)

Synonyms
- Tanystropheus posthumus Huene, 1908; Coelophysis posthumus (Huene, 1908)

Extinct genus of dinosaurs

Tanystrosuchus (meaning "long crocodile") is a dubious genus of theropod dinosaur from the late Triassic period (middle Norian stage, around 208 million years ago). It is known from a single fossil neck vertebra of the species T. posthumus, found in the Middle Stubensandstein formation of what is present-day Germany.

== History ==
The vertebra used to name Tanystrosuchus (specimen SMNS 4385) was originally found by S.F.J. von Kapff in the 1860s. Christian Erich Hermann von Meyer described the vertebra in 1865, but did not attempt to classify it. In 1907, Friedrich von Huene examined the fossil and recognized it as part of a theropod dinosaur. He thought it probably belonged to the genus Tanystropheus (thought to be a theropod at the time), and named a new species for it, Tanystropheus posthumus. The vertebra was added to the collections of the Staatliches Museum for Naturkunde in Stuttgart, but was labelled as a specimen of the phytosaurid Nicrosaurus. In 2000, Oliver Rauhut and Axel Hungerbühler re-examined the specimen and concluded that, while it was similar in some respects to the same bone in the contemporary Liliensternus, and was definitely from a theropod, it could not be classified due to its incomplete nature. Tanystrosuchus is considered to be a nomen dubium for that reason.
