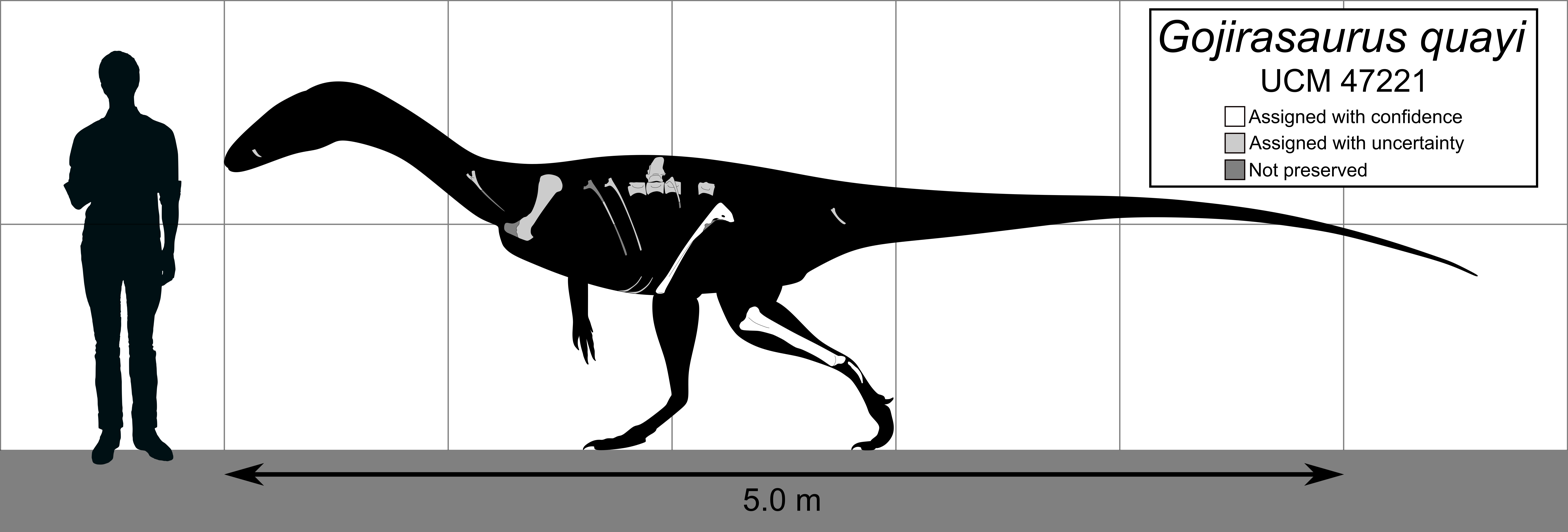
- Scale and skeletal diagram

Scientific classification
- Kingdom: Animalia
- Phylum: Chordata
- Class: Reptilia
- Clade: Dinosauria
- Clade: Saurischia
- Clade: Theropoda
- Genus: †Gojirasaurus; Carpenter, 1997
- Species: †G. quayi

Binomial name
- †Gojirasaurus quayi Carpenter, 1997

Synonyms
- †"Revueltoraptor lucasi" Hunt, 1994

= Gojirasaurus =

Gojirasaurus Temporal range: Late Triassic, "Revueltian" (mid-late Norian), 212 Ma

Extinct genus of dinosaurs

Gojirasaurus is a genus of theropod dinosaur named after the Japanese giant movie monster Godzilla. It lived in the Late Triassic Period, containing a single known species, Gojirasaurus quayi.

== Discovery ==
Gojirasaurus quayi was described and named by Kenneth Carpenter in 1997 based on a partial skeleton, the holotype specimen UCM 47221, from Quay County, New Mexico. The holotype is an assortment of various postcranial bones, including a right scapula, right pubis, left tibia, left metatarsal V, four vertebral centra, a neural arch, and fragments of ribs and gastralia. In addition, a single large serrated tooth is associated with the postcranial material. The holotype is housed in the collections of the University of Colorado Museum of Natural History, in Boulder, Colorado.

The specimen hails from purplish-grey mudstones of the Bull Canyon Formation (sometimes called the Cooper Canyon Formation), a major fossiliferous component of the Dockum Group in eastern New Mexico. In particular, it was found at a site in the vicinity of Revuelto Creek, the type locality for the Revueltian "faunachron". The Revueltian is a biostratigraphic unit roughly equivalent to the mid-late Norian stage of the Triassic Period, approximately 215–207 million years ago. The Revuelto Creek fossils were deposited in the earlier part of the Revueltian, close to around 212 million years ago.

Though it would not be formally named until 1997, the fossils of Gojirasaurus were frequently mentioned through the 1980s and 1990s, as a robust Coelophysis-like theropod from Revuelto Creek. Among these preliminary accounts is a short description by Parrish & Carpenter (1986). In 1994, an unpublished thesis by Adrian Hunt attempted to name the Revuelto Creek theropod as "Revueltoraptor lucasi". Hunt's conception of the species included not just UCM 47221, but also numerous theropod-like fossils stored at the NMMNH (New Mexico Museum of Natural History and Science). As a name, "Revueltoraptor lucasi" was never formally published, and later evaluations recognized that most of Hunt's additional fossils are likely from Shuvosaurus rather than theropods.

=== Etymology ===
The generic name Gojirasaurus is derived from the name of the giant Japanese movie monster "Gojira" (Godzilla) and the Greek word "sauros" (σαυρος) meaning "lizard"; thus, "Godzilla lizard". Carpenter (1997) selected "Gojira" in reference to the relatively large size of this theropod, which exceeded that of its Triassic counterparts. The specific name quayi is a reference to Quay County.

== Description ==
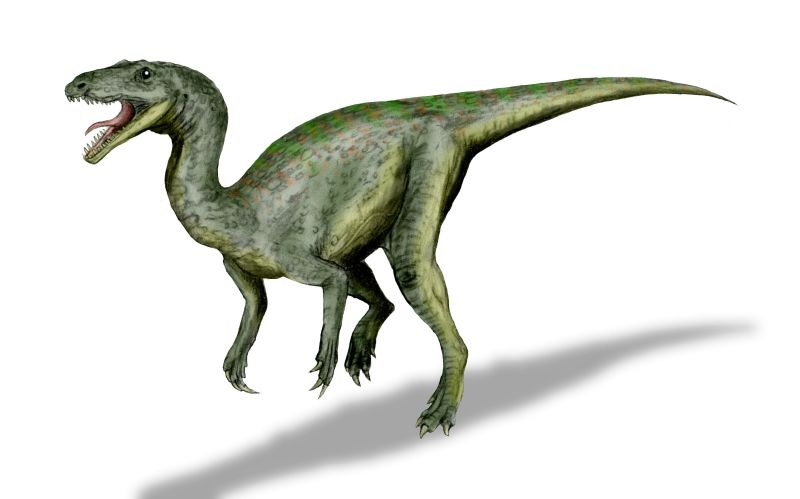
Speculative life restoration

Gojirasaurus is one of the largest theropods known from the Triassic Period, with an estimate total length of 5.5–6 metres (18–20 ft) long and a weight of at least 150 kilograms (330 lb). Benson et al. (2018) estimated that it weighed around 190 kilograms (420 lb), only exceeded by Herrerasaurus among Triassic carnivorous dinosaurs. Carpenter (1997) pointed to features of the pelvis and ankle suggesting that this was an immature individual, and could therefore have grown to even a larger size in maturity. Christopher T. Griffin (2019) and Griffin and Nesbitt (2020) confirmed that Gojirasaurus possessed features indicative of ontogenetic immaturity.

=== Distinguishing anatomical features ===
According to Nesbitt et al. (2007), Gojirasaurus can be distinguished based on the fact that its tibia is more robust than that of its relative Coelophysis. Rauhut (2003) attempted to diagnose this genus based on the fact that the mid/posterior dorsal vertebrae had taller neural spines than those observed in other coelophysoids.

Griffin (2019) followed Nesbitt (2007)'s diagnosis on Gojirasaurus and distinguishes it from Megapnosaurus and Dilophosaurus based on several characteristics of metatarsal V.

== Classification ==
Parrish and Carpenter (1986) drew similarities between UCM 47221 and "Halticosaurus liliensterni", a large German theropod now known as Liliensternus. Both were assigned to the family "Procompsognathidae", though the authors acknowledged that family names in use at the time were provisional and likely to be obsolete in the future. Conversely, Hunt (1994) and Hunt et al. (1998) argued that the specimen is a herrerasaurid, alongside various other fossils from the Late Triassic of North America. The formal naming and description of Gojirasaurus by Carpenter (1997) firmly classified it within Coelophysoidea. Many traits were comparable to Coelophysis, Dilophosaurus, and particularly Liliensternus.

Various phylogenetic analyses in the 2000s supported coelophysoid affinities for Gojirasaurus, close to or among the smaller Coelophysidae rather than with Dilophosaurus. Many studies noted that its remains are too fragmentary for further elaboration. Starting with Yates (2005), the monophyly of Coelophysoidea has been brought into question, with Dilophosaurus resolving as more closely related to averostrans (non-coelophysoid theropods). In some analyses, Gojirasaurus maintains its position among the coelophysids, but other studies instead bring it over to Averostriformes, the grade of theropods including Dilophosaurus that leads to Averostra.

=== Validity ===
A persistent question regarding Gojirasaurus quayi is how much of its fossil material actually belongs to one species. Gojirasaurus coexisted with Shuvosaurus, an unusual reptile with a toothless beak and bipedal stance. Though previously regarded as an aberrant dinosaur, by 2007 most specialists agreed that Shuvosaurus was actually more closely related to crocodilians, and that its dinosaur-like traits are merely convergent. According to Nesbitt et al. (2007), some components of UCM 47221, such as the tibia and pubis, are clearly coelophysoid in form and distinct from Shuvosaurus. However, other parts of the skeleton, such as the scapula and vertebrae, are not readily distinguishable from Shuvosaurus. The serrated tooth could be from any number of large carnivorous archosaurs which inhabited the area.

Even the assuredly coelophysoid components of the skeleton have few unambiguous unique features. For example, the robust tibia is similar to Coelophysis-like fossils which Kevin Padian (1986) described from Petrified Forest National Park in Arizona, only differing in size. Several studies regard Gojirasaurus as a "metataxon": a collection of fossils for which assignment to a single species can neither be proven nor disproven. Nevertheless, Gojirasaurus persists in the scientific literature as a useful example of a large Triassic coelophysoid, validity notwithstanding.

== Paleoecology ==
Gojirasaurus's assignment to the Coelophysoidea would suggest that it was a bipedal, terrestrial, actively mobile carnivore.

The Revuelto Creek area preserves a diverse fauna of both terrestrial and aquatic animals from the Bull Canyon Formation. On land, herbivorous pseudosuchians are quite common, including the shuvosaurid Shuvosaurus inexpectatus, the aetosaurs Typothorax coccinarum, Paratypothorax, and Rioarribasuchus, and the small aetosauriform Revueltosaurus callenderi. Both Shuvosaurus and Revueltosaurus have previously been misidentified as dinosaurs.

Among terrestrial carnivores, Gojirasaurus was joined by at least a few other true dinosaurs. Bull Canyon dinosaur fragments are sometimes identified as coelophysids, herrerasaurids, and/or Chindesaurus, but most are too fragmentary to assess in great detail. Lepidosauromorphs, crocodylomorphs, and large carnivorous rauisuchians are also represented by rare fragments. Particularly robust archosauromorph limb fragments, previously thought to be from a late-surviving rhynchosaur ("Otischalkia"), are probably from malerisaurine azendohsaurids instead. The early turtle Chinlechelys tenertesta is a notable component of the terrestrial fauna.

Phytosaur fossils are common at Revuelto Creek. One particularly impressive phytosaur skull was initially referred to Smilosuchus gregorii, and later to Arribasuchus buceros. It and other Bull Canyon phytosaur remains most likely belong to a species of Machaeroprosopus (Pseudopalatus). Small metoposaurid amphibians, sometimes identified as "Apachesaurus gregorii", frequent the area alongside larger metoposaurids. Various fish inhabited the waterways: arganodontid lungfish, coelacanths (Quayia zideki), and actinopterygians.

== See also ==
- Timeline of coelophysoid research
