= Moon-Airel Formation =

Fossil-bearing rock formation in France

- Stratigraphic range: Rhaetian-Hettangian; ~206–197 Ma
- Type: Geological formation

Lithology
- Primary: Limestone
- Other: Claystone

Location
- Coordinates: 49.2°N 1.1°E
- Approximate paleocoordinates: 35.0°N 4.5°E
- Region: Basse-Normandie
- Country: France
- Moon-Airel Formation (France)

The Moon-Airel Formation is a geological formation in France. It dates back to the late Rhaetian and early Hettangian.

== Fossil content ==
Color key: Taxon / Reclassified taxon / Taxon falsely reported as present / Dubious taxon or junior synonym / Ichnotaxon / Ootaxon / Morphotaxon	Notes; Uncertain or tentative taxa are in small text; ~~crossed out~~ taxa are discredited.

=== Dinosaurs ===
==== Theropods ====
Theropods of the Moon-Airel Formation
Genus	Species	Location	Stratigraphic position	Material	Notes	Image
Lophostropheus	L. airelensis	De La Manche			A coelophysoid theropod	

== See also ==
- List of dinosaur-bearing rock formations
