= Martín Ezcurra =

Argentine palaeontologist (born 1987)

Martin D. Ezcurra
- Born: April 23, 1987 (age 39); Buenos Aires, Argentina
- Known for: Discoveries in paleontology
- Scientific career
- Fields: Paleontology (vertebrate and invertebrate)
- Author abbrev. (zoology): Ezcurra

Martín Daniel Ezcurra (born April 23, 1987) is an Argentine palaeontologist who has assisted in the naming of several extinct genera such as Aerotitan, Lophostropheus and Powellvenator.

== Biography ==
Ezcurra was born on April 23, 1987. He first got into paleontology in 2002 while working with Fernando Novas in Argentina. He went to university in Buenos Aires, Munich, and Birmingham. His first papers were published in 2006. Martin Ezcurra obtained his Master's-level studies in 2012 at the Universidad de Buenos Aires (Argentina) with specialization in animal anatomy and systematics. As an undergraduate student, Martin conducted since 2002 research on basal dinosaurs and theropods under the advice of Fernando Novas in the Museo Argentino de Ciencias Naturales (Buenos Aires, Argentina). In 2012, Martin moved to LMU Munich (Germany) and started his PhD research on basal archosauriforms under the advice of Richard Butler. In September 2013, Martin transferred to the University of Birmingham to continue his PhD research.

== Works (as of 2013) ==
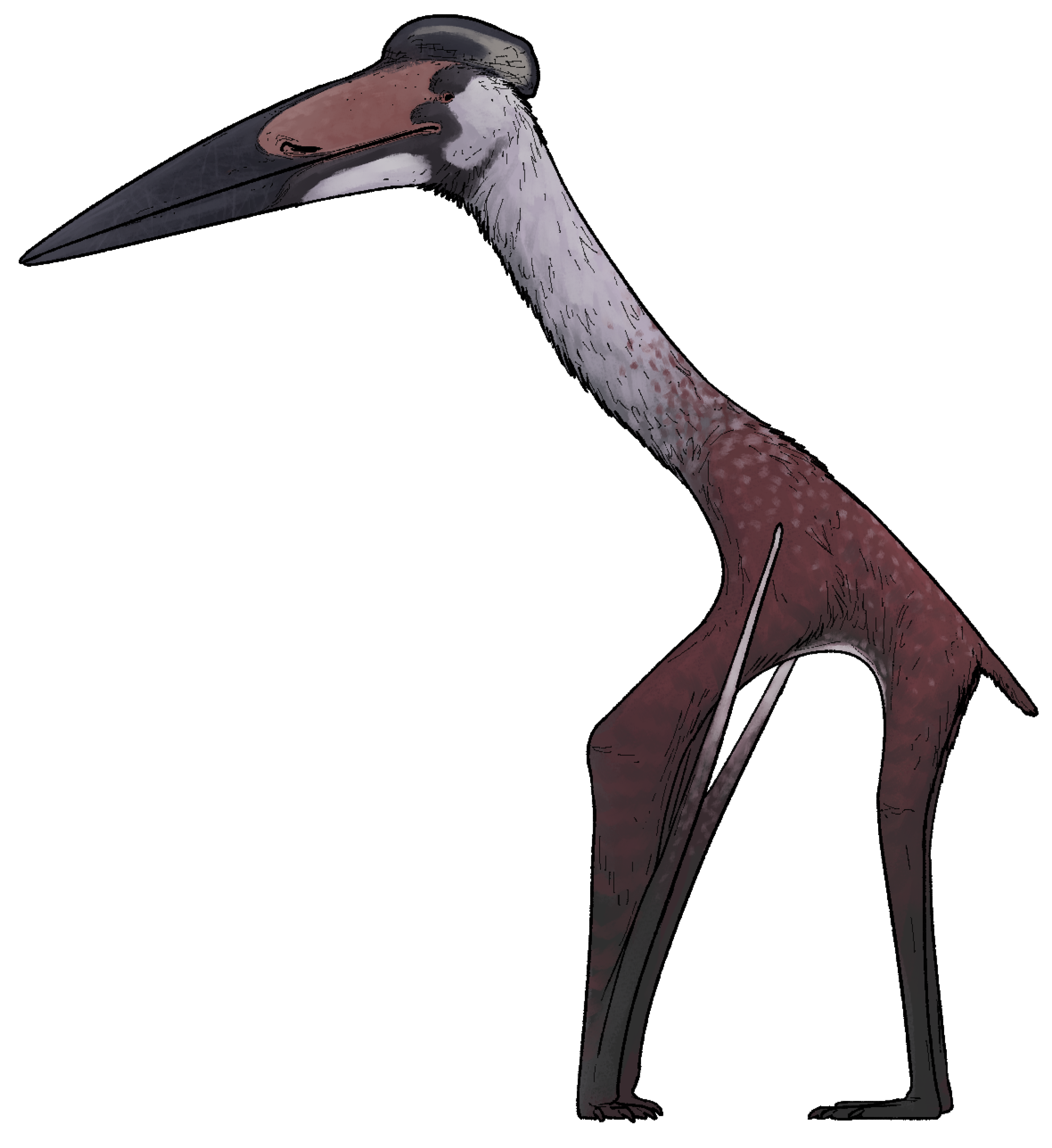
Aerotitan, one of the extinct reptiles named by Ezcurra

In press

- Ezcurra M.D., Trotteyn M.J., Fiorelli L.E., Taborda J.R.A, Baczko, von, M.B., IberluceaM, Desojo J.B. In press. The oldest rhynchosaur from Argentina: a Middle Triassic rhynchosaurid from the Chañares Formation. Paläontologische Zeitschirft.

2013

- Baczko M.B., von, Ezcurra M.D. 2013. Ornithosuchidae. In: Anatomy, Phylogeny and Palaeobiology of Basal Archosaurs. Nesbitt S.J., Desojo J.B., and Irmis R.B. (eds.), Geological Society, London, Special Publication 379: 187–202.
- Ezcurra, M.D., Butler, R.J., Gower, D.J. 2013. Proterosuchia. In: Anatomy, Phylogeny and Palaeobiology of Basal Archosaurs. Nesbitt S.J., Desojo J.B., and Irmis R.B. (eds.), Geological Society, London, Special Publication 379: 9-33.
- Novas F.E., Agnolín F.L., Ezcurra M.D., Porfiri J., Canale J.I. 2013. Evolution of the carnivorous dinosaurs during the Cretaceous: the evidence from Patagonia. Cretaceous Research, 42 pp.
- Sues H.-D., Desojo J.B., Ezcurra M.D. 2013. Doswelliidae. In: Anatomy, Phylogeny and Palaeobiology of Basal Archosaurs. Nesbitt S.J., Desojo J.B., and Irmis R.B. (eds.), Geological Society, London, Special Publication 379: 49–58.

2012

- Desojo J.B., Ezcurra M.D., and Kischlat E. 2012. A new aetosaur genus (Archosauria: Pseudosuchia) from the early Late Triassic of southern Brazil. Zootaxa3166: 1-33.
- Ezcurra M.D. 2012. Comments on the taxonomic diversity and paleobiogeography of the earliest known dinosaur assemblages (late Carnian–earliest Norian). Revista de Historia Natural, nueva serie, 2: 49–71.
- Ezcurra M.D. and Agnolín F.L. 2012. A New Global Palaeobiogeographical Model for the late Mesozoic and early Tertiary. Systematic Biology 61: 553–566.
- Ezcurra M.D. and Agnolín F.L. 2012. An abelisauroid dinosaur from the Middle Jurassic of Laurasia and its implications on theropod palaeobiogeography and evolution. Proceedings of the Geologists’ Association 123: 500–507.
- Novas F.E., Ezcurra M.D., Agnolín F.L., Pol D., Ortíz R. 2012. New Patagonian Cretaceous theropod sheds light about the early radiation of Coelurosauria. Revista del Museo Argentino de Ciencias Naturales, nueva serie, 14: 57–81.
- Novas F.E., Kundrat M., Agnolín F.L., Ezcurra M.D., Ahlberg P.E., Isasi M.P., Arriagada A., Chafrat P. 2012. A new large pterosaur from the Late Cretaceous of Patagonia. Journal of Vertebrate Paleontology 32: 1147–1452.

2011

- Desojo J.B and Ezcurra M.D. 2011. A reappraisal of the taxonomic status of Aetosauroides (Archosauria: Aetosauria) specimens from the Late Triassic of South America and their proposed synonymy with Stagonolepis. Journal of Vertebrate Paleontology 31: 596–609.
- Desojo J.B., Ezcurra M.D., and Schultz C.L. 2011. An unusual new archosauriform from the Middle-Late Triassic of southern Brazil and the monophyly of Doswelliidae. Zoological Journal of the Linnean Society 161: 839–871.
- Ezcurra M.D. and Apaldetti C. 2011. A robust sauropodomorph specimen from the Upper Triassic of Argentina and insights on the diversity of the Los Colorados Formation. Proceedings of the Geologist's Association 123: 155–164.
- Ezcurra M.D. and Brusatte S.L. 2011. Taxonomic and phylogenetic reassessment of the early neotheropod dinosaur Camposaurus arizonensis from the Late Triassic of North America. Palaeontology 54: 763–772.
- Gianechini F.A., Agnolín F.L., and Ezcurra M.D. 2011. A reassessment of the purportedly venomous delivering system of the bird-like raptor Sinornithosaurus. Paläontologische Zeitschrift 85: 103–107.
- Novas F.E., Ezcurra M.D., Chatterjee, S., and Kutty, T.S. 2011. New dinosaur species from the Upper Triassic Upper Maleri and Lower Dharmaram formations of Central India. Earth and Environmental Science Transactions of the Royal Society of Edinburgh101: 333–349.

2010

- Agnolín F.L., Ezcurra M.D., Pais D.F., and Salisbury S.W. 2010. An overview of the Cretaceous non-avian dinosaur faunas from Australia and New Zealand: evidence for their Gondwanan affinities. Journal of Systematic Palaeontology 8: 257–300.
- Ezcurra M.D. 2010. Biogeography of Triassic tetrapods: evidence for provincialism and driven sympatric cladogenesis in the early evolution of modern tetrapod lineages. Proceedings of the Royal Society Series B 277: 2547–2552.
- Ezcurra M.D. 201b. A new early dinosaur (Saurischia: Sauropodomorpha) from the Late Triassic of Argentina: a reassess of dinosaur origin and phylogeny. Journal of Systematic Palaeontology 8: 371–425.
- Ezcurra M.D., Agnolin F.L., and Novas F.E. 2010. An abelisauroid dinosaur with a non-atrophied manus from the Late Cretaceous Pari Aike Formation of southern Patagonia. Zootaxa 2450: 1-25.
- Ezcurra M.D., Lecuona A., and Martinelli A. 2010. A new basal archosauriform diapsid from the Early Triassic of Argentina. Journal of Vertebrate Paleontology 30: 1433–1450.
- Langer M.C., Ezcurra M.D., Bittencourt J., and Novas F.E. 2010. The origin and early radiation of dinosaurs. Biological Reviews 85: 55–110.

2009

- Ezcurra M.D. 2009. Theropod remains from the latest Cretaceous of Colombia and their implications on the palaeozoogeography of western Gondwana. Cretaceous Research 30: 1339–1344.
- Ezcurra M.D. and Méndez A.H. 2009. First report of a derived abelisaurid theropod from the Bajo de la Carpa Formation (Late Cretaceous), Patagonia, Argentina. Bulletin of Geosciences 84: 547–554.

2008

- Novas F.E., Ezcurra M.D., and Lecuona A. 2008. Orkoraptor burkei nov. gen. et nov. sp., a large basal coelurosaurian theropod from the Maastrichtian Pari Aike Formation, Southern Patagonia, Argentina. Cretaceous Research 29: 468–480.
- Smith N.D., Makovicky P.J., Agnolin F.L., Ezcurra M.D., Pais D.F., and Salisbury S.W. 2008. Megaraptor (Dinosauria: Tetanurae) in Australia; evidence for faunal interchange between eastern and western Gondwana during the Early Cretaceous. Proceedings of the Royal Society Series B 275: 2085–2093.

2007

- Ezcurra M.D. 2007. The cranial anatomy of the coelophysoid theropod Zupaysaurus rougieri (Upper Triassic, Argentina). Historical Biology 19: 185–202.
- Ezcurra M.D. and Cuny G. 2007. The coelophysoid Lophostropheus airelensis nov. gen.: a review of the systematics of “Liliensternus” airelensis from the Triassic-Jurassic outcrops of Normandy (France). Journal of Vertebrate Paleontology 27: 73–86.
- Ezcurra M.D. and Novas F.E. 2007. Phylogenetic relationships of the Triassic theropod Zupaysaurus rougieri from NW Argentina. Historical Biology 19: 35–72.

2006

- Ezcurra M.D. 2006. A review of the systematic position of the dinosauriform archosaur Eucoelophysis baldwini from the Upper Triassic of New Mexico, USA. Geodiversitas 28: 649–684.
- Novas F.E., Ezcurra M.D., and Agnolin F.L. 2006. Humerus of a basal abelisauroid theropod from the Late Cretaceous of Patagonia. Revista del Museo Argentino de Ciencias Naturales 8: 63–68.
