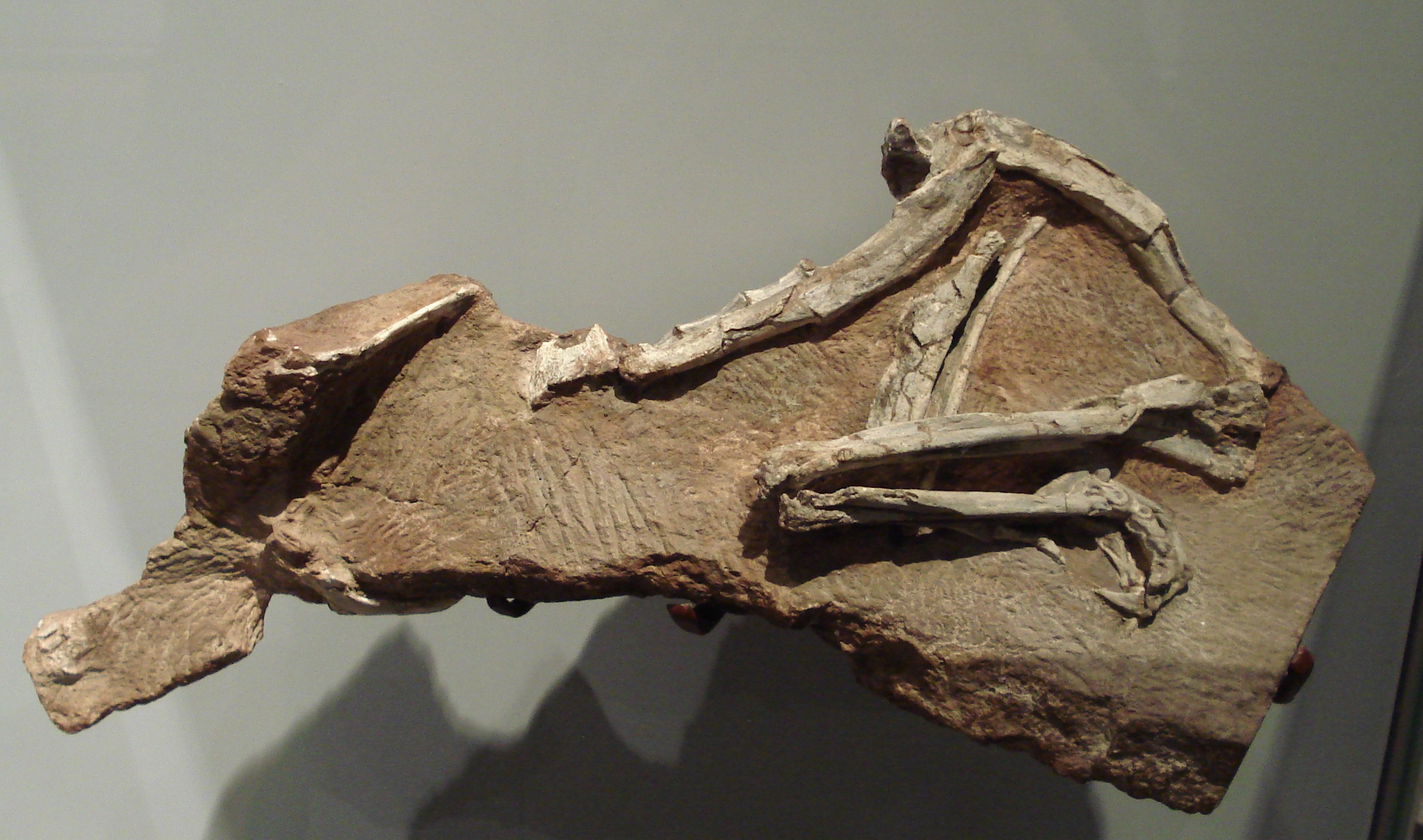
- Holotype specimen (SMNS 12591)

Scientific classification
- Kingdom: Animalia
- Phylum: Chordata
- Class: Reptilia
- Clade: Dinosauria
- Clade: Saurischia
- Clade: Theropoda
- Family: †Coelophysidae
- Genus: †Procompsognathus; Fraas, 1913
- Species: †P. triassicus

Binomial name
- †Procompsognathus triassicus Fraas, 1913

= Procompsognathus =

Procompsognathus Temporal range: Norian ~210 Ma

Extinct genus of dinosaurs

Procompsognathus /ˌproʊkɒmpˈsɒɡnəθəs/ is an extinct genus of coelophysid theropod dinosaur that lived approximately 210 million years ago during the later part of the Triassic Period, in what is now Germany. Procompsognathus was a small-sized, lightly built, ground-dwelling, bipedal carnivore, that could grow up to 1 m (3.3 ft) long.

== Discovery and naming ==
The fragmentary and poorly preserved skeleton of Procompsognathus was found in the Middle Stubensandstein member of the Löwenstein Formation at the Weiße Steinbruch, the quarry of Albert Burrer on the northern slopes of the Stromberg region near Pfaffenhofen in Württemberg, Germany. The discovery was made by Albert Burrer in the spring of 1909 in white sandstone and gray/blue marl sediments that were deposited during the Norian stage of the Triassic period.

The holotype SMNS 12591, consisted of three blocks of sandstone: one showed a small, seven-centimetre-long, severely crushed skull with lower jaws. The second and third contained the partly articulated remains of a postcranial skeleton, including twenty-nine vertebrae of the neck, back and tail; ribs; elements of the shoulder girdle and a forelimb; an ilium; both pubis and the hindlimbs. It represents an adult individual.

Burrer sent the specimen to Professor Eberhard Fraas of the königliche Stuttgarter Naturalienkabinett. In a lecture on 9 October 1911, Fraas referred to it by the name "Hallopus celerrimus", considering it a jumping form of dinosaur that was approximately 60 cm (2.0 ft) long, and was associated with the origin of birds. Later, Fraas decided to use a different name in the official publication. Fraas in 1913 named the genus Procompsognathus with as type species, Procompsognathus triassicus. The type specimen is housed in the collection of the State Museum of Natural History in Stuttgart, Germany.

In 1921, Friedrich von Huene referred two more specimens, both also found in the Burrer quarry, in 1908, to Procompsognathus: SMNS 12352, a partial skull and lower jaws from a larger individual than the holotype, and SMNS 12352a, an isolated left hand.

The genus name Procompsognathus, means "before elegant jaw", and is derived from the name of another dinosaur, Compsognathus. A later (Jurassic) small predatory dinosaur, Compsognathus takes its name from the Greek word kompsos (κομψός) which can be rendered as "elegant", "refined" or "dainty" and the Greek word gnathos (γνάθος) which means "jaw". The prefix Pro (προ) implies "before" or "ancestor of", although this direct lineage was not supported by subsequent research. The specific name triassicus refers to the geologic time period to which this dinosaur belongs, the Triassic.

== Description ==
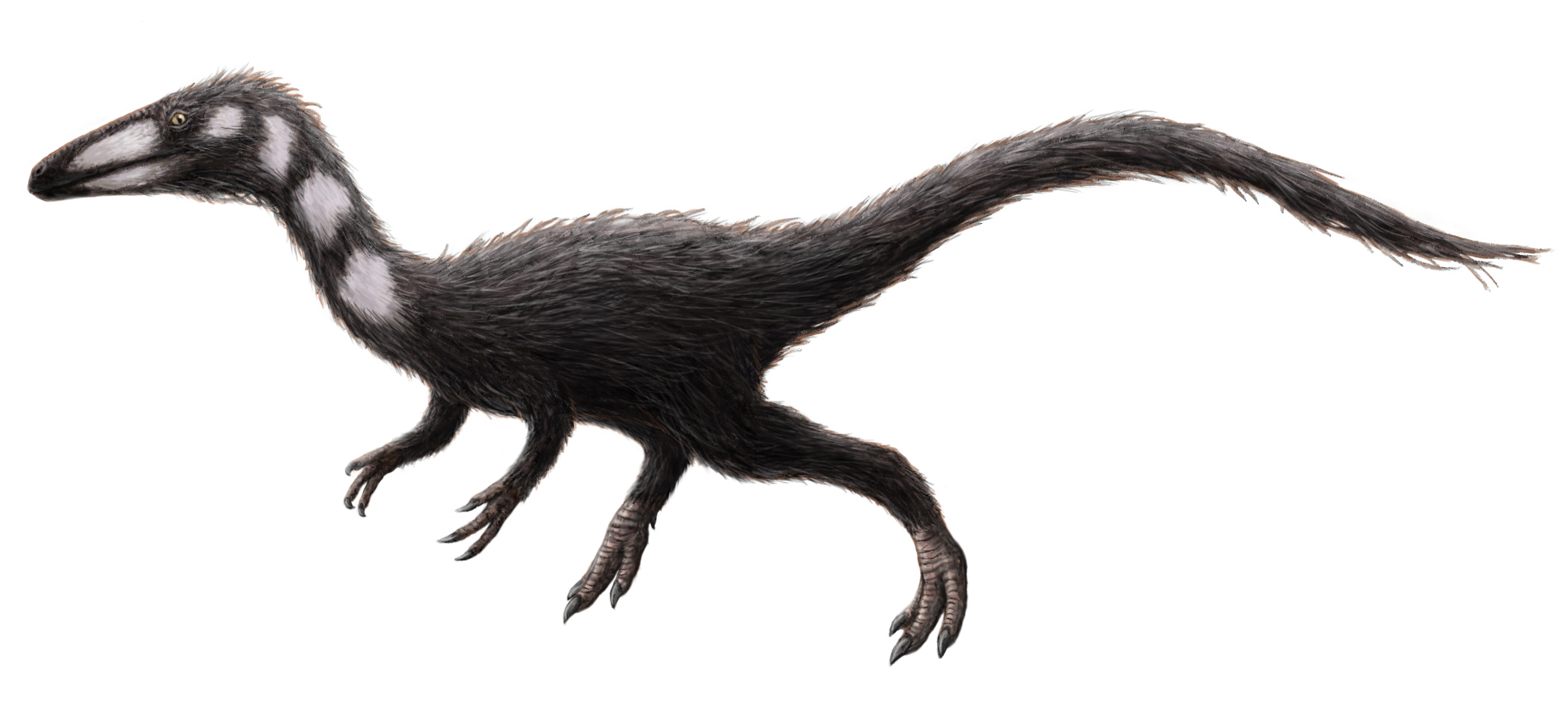
Life restoration

Procompsognathus may have been about 1 metre (3.3 ft) long, though Fraas in 1913 estimated a length of 75 cm (2.5 ft). In 2010 Gregory S. Paul gave an estimate of 1 kilogram (2.2 lb) for the weight with a length of 1.1 metres (3.6 ft). In 2016, the holotype gained estimates of 1.3 kg and 28 cm in height at the hips. A biped, Procompsognathus had long hind legs, short arms, large clawed hands, a long slender snout with many small teeth, and a stiff tail. The femur discovered for the type specimen of this genus measures 93mm and the tibia, 112mm. The tibia is approximately 20% longer than the femur in Procompsognathus, an adaptation which has been strongly correlated with the development of cursorial habits in dinosaurs, suggesting that they were good runners.

== Classification ==
=== Type specimen SMNS 12591 ===
While it is undoubtedly a small, bipedal carnivore, the extremely poor preservation of the only known Procompsognathus fossil makes its exact identity difficult to determine. Fraas originally assigned it to the Dinosauria. In 1923 Franz Nopcsa coined a Procompsognathinae, and in 1929 von Huene created a Procompsognathidae, though these concepts are today rarely used. In 1932 von Huene saw it as a member of the non-dinosaurian Pseudosuchia. It has since then usually been considered a theropod dinosaur, with some exceptions. In 1992 Paul Sereno and Rupert Wild stated that the holotype specimen consisted of fossils from two separate animals: the postcranial skeleton would be a theropod, likely a coelophysoid related to Segisaurus, but the skull and the von Huene specimens they referred to the basal crocodylomorph Saltoposuchus connectens. However, in 1993 Sankar Chatterjee after further preparation refuted their assessment and regarded the skull as that of a theropod similar to Megapnosaurus, and demonstrated that it could not have been a crocodylomorph, as it lacks the landmark features of this group. Sereno (1997) and Ezcurra and Novas (2007) conducted phylogenetic analysis that supported the placement of Procompsognathus in the taxon Coelophysidae. Carrano et al. (2005) suggested that the genus may be most closely related to Segisaurus halli. More recent phylogenetic analyses continued to recover this genus as the most basal (early-diverging) coelophysid.

=== Referred specimens SMNS 12352 and SMNS 12352a ===
Much controversy has arisen however, about the association with the later material referred by von Huene. In 1982 John Ostrom claimed that SMNS 12352 and SMNS 12352a originated from a taxon different from the holotype. In 2006 and 2008 Fabien Knoll concluded that SMNS 12352 represented a crocodylomorph and SMNS 12352a a crocodylomorph or some other basal archosaur. The postcranial skeleton, for which he reserved the inventory number SMNS 12591, was a coelophysoid; and the skull, now indicated with the number SMNS 12591a, a perhaps more derived theropod, possibly a basal member of the Tetanurae. In 2012 Knoll after a CAT-scan reaffirmed that SMNS 12352 was a crocodylomorph, but established it was different from Saltoposuchus.

Oliver Rauhut and Axel Hungerbuhler (2000) noted features of the vertebrae which suggest that Procompsognathus may be a coelophysid or ceratosaur, and Carrano et al. (2005), in their re-study of the related genus Segisaurus, found both Segisaurus and Procompsognathus to belong to the Coelophysidae within Dinosauria. In 2004 David Allen considered Procompsognathus to be a primitive, non-dinosaurian ornithodiran.

== Paleoecology ==
Procompsognathus lived in a relatively dry, inland environment and may have eaten insects, lizards and other small prey. Contemporaries of Procompsognathus included the coelophysoids Halticosaurus and Dolichosuchus, as well as the Sauropodomorphs Plateosaurus gracilis and Efraasia minor. Weishampel, et al. (2004) noted that theropod tracks and fossils of an unnamed herrerasaur genus are known from the Lower Stubensandstein.

== In popular culture ==
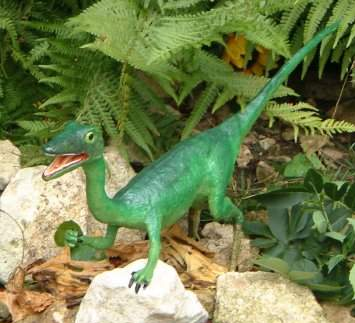
Outdated model

Procompsognathus appears in the novel Jurassic Park and its sequel The Lost World by Michael Crichton. Individuals of the species are sometimes referred to as "compys" by the characters. While the author invents a venomous bite for Procompsognathus with soporific effects, there is no evidence to support venom in Procompsognathus.
