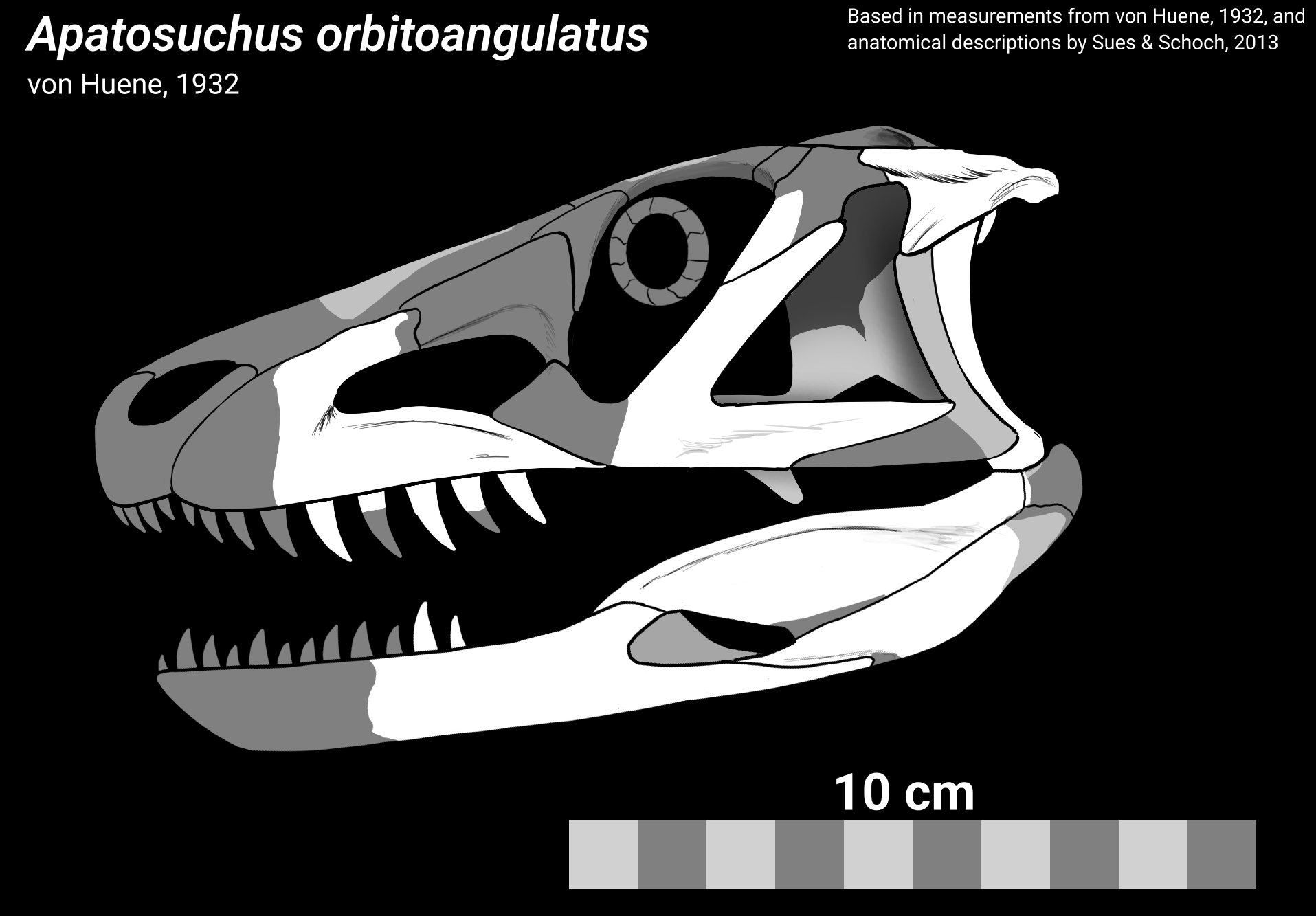
- Skull diagram
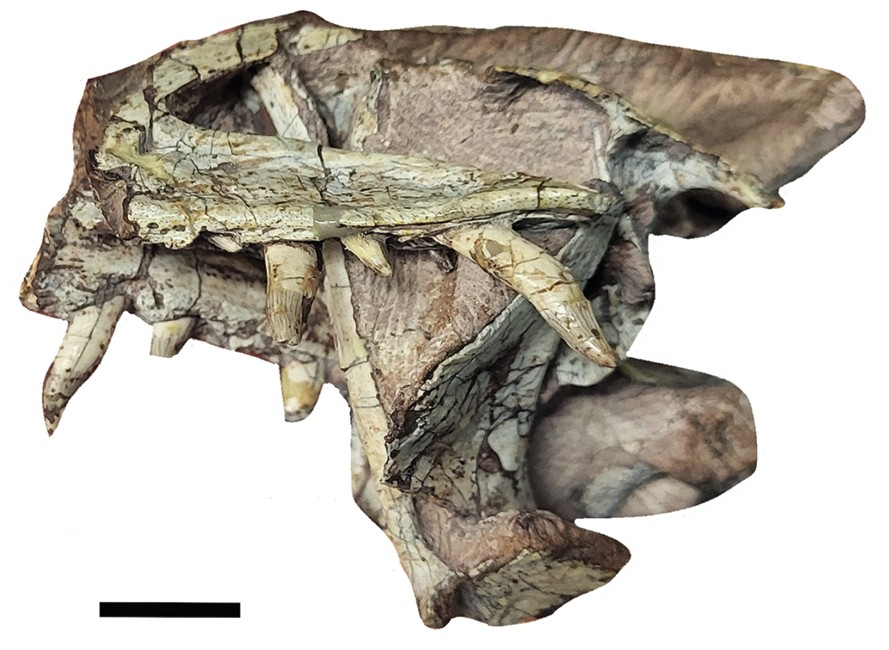
- Part of the holotype specimen

Scientific classification
- Kingdom: Animalia
- Phylum: Chordata
- Class: Reptilia
- Clade: Pseudosuchia
- Clade: Loricata
- Genus: †Apatosuchus; Sues & Schoch, 2013
- Species: †A. orbitoangulatus

Binomial name
- †Apatosuchus orbitoangulatus von Huene, 1932

Synonyms
- Halticosaurus orbitoangulatus von Huene, 1932

= Apatosuchus =

Apatosuchus Temporal range: Norian ~222–208 Ma

Extinct genus of reptiles

Apatosuchus is an extinct genus of non-crocodylomorph loricatan pseudosuchian known from the Late Triassic of Germany. It is known from a partial holotype skull from the middle Stubensandstein (a deposit that dates back to the Norian stage and is part of the Löwenstein Formation) in Baden-Württemberg. The type species is Halticosaurus orbitoangulatus. A. orbitoangulatus was first described by German paleontologist Friedrich von Huene in 1932, who considered it a species of the theropod dinosaur Halticosaurus. Some later studies proposed that it was an early crocodylomorph or "sphenosuchian" like Saltoposuchus, another pseudosuchian from the middle Stubensandstein of Baden-Württemberg. The name Apatosuchus, "deceptive crocodile", was erected for H. orbitoangulatus by Hans-Dieter Sues and Rainer R. Schoch in 2013 when it was realized that the known material represented a pseudosuchian archosaur rather than a dinosaur, as a result of further preparation of the specimen, coining the combinatio nova Apatosuchus orbitoangulatus. Apatosuchus is now thought to be a basal member of the clade Loricata. Apatosuchus is much smaller than other basal loricatans such as Teratosaurus and Batrachotomus.

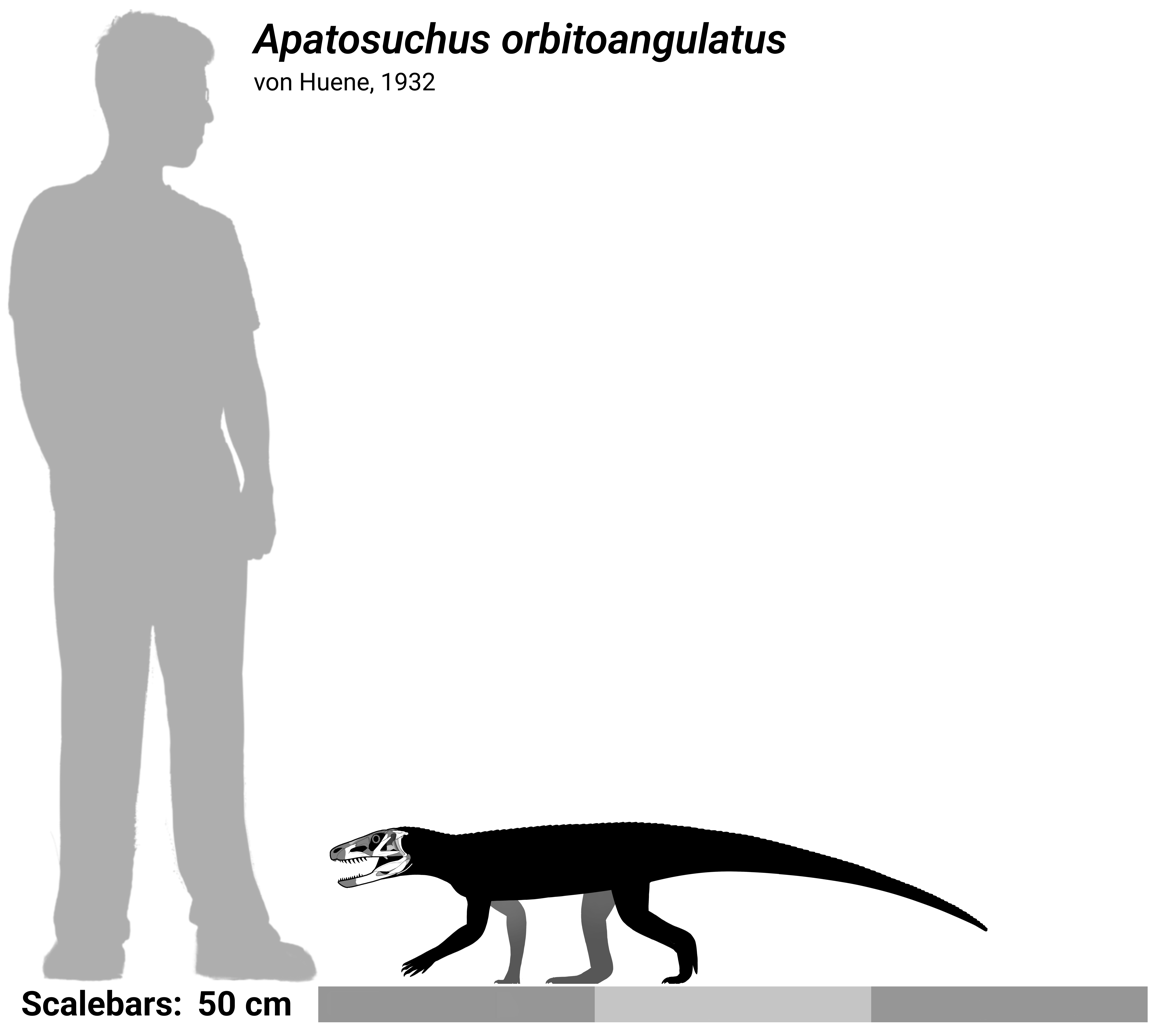
Size comparison with a 175 cm tall human

== Phylogeny ==
A phylogenetic analysis performed by Sues & Schoch (2013) found Apatosuchus to be the sister taxon of the clade formed by Batrachotomus and more derived loricatans. This position was supported by two unambiguous synapomorphies: the presence of a ridge on the dorsal surface of squamosal along the edge of supratemporal fossa, and concaved rear portion of the nasals at the midline. The data matrix of Sues & Schoch (2013), a list of characteristics that was used in the analysis, was based on that of Nesbitt (2011), one of the most extensive on archosaurs. Below is a cladogram from the analysis.

- Loricata
  - Prestosuchus
  - - Saurosuchus
    - - Apatosuchus
      - - Batrachotomus
        - - Fasolasuchus
          - - Crocodylomorpha
            - Rauisuchidae
              - Rauisuchus
              - - Polonosuchus silesiacus
                - Postosuchus kirkpatricki
                - Postosuchus alisonae
