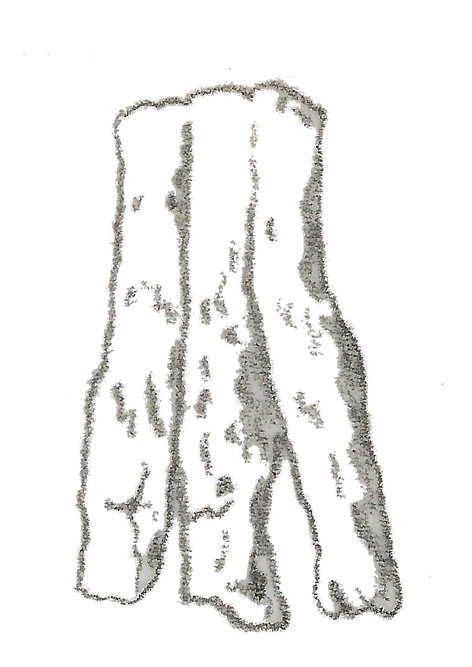
- Foot

Scientific classification
- Domain: Eukaryota
- Kingdom: Animalia
- Phylum: Chordata
- Class: Reptilia
- Clade: Archosauromorpha
- Clade: Archosauriformes
- Clade: Archosauria
- Genus: †Avipes

Type species
- †Avipes dillstedtianus Huene, 1932

= Avipes =

Avipes Temporal range: Middle Triassic, 240 Ma

Extinct genus of reptiles

Avipes (meaning "bird foot") is a genus of extinct archosaurs represented by the single species Avipes dillstedtianus, which lived during the middle Triassic period. The only known fossil specimen, a partial foot (metatarsals), was found in Bedheim, Thuringia, Germany, in deposits of Lettenkohlensandstein (a form of sandstone). Avipes was named in 1932 by Huene. Although originally classified as a coelurosaur or a ceratosaur, a new study of the fossil specimen found that it was too incomplete to assign to a group more specific than Archosauria, and so it was regarded as indeterminate by Rauhut and Hungerbuhler in 2000.
