= Lophostropheus =

Lophostropheus Temporal range: Late Triassic-Early Jurassic, 205.6–196.5 Ma

Scientific classification
- Kingdom: Animalia
- Phylum: Chordata
- Class: Reptilia
- Clade: Dinosauria
- Clade: Saurischia
- Clade: Theropoda
- Superfamily: †Coelophysoidea
- Genus: †Lophostropheus; Ezcurra & Cuny, 2007
- Species: †L. airelensis

Binomial name
- †Lophostropheus airelensis (Cuny & Galton, 1993)

Synonyms
- Liliensternus airelensis Cuny & Galton, 1993

Extinct genus of dinosaurs

Lophostropheus (/ˌloʊfəˈstroʊfiːəs/ LOH-fə-STROH-fee-əs) is an extinct genus of coelophysoid theropod dinosaur that lived approximately 205.6 to 196.5 million years ago during the boundary between the Late Triassic Period and the Early Jurassic Period, in what is now Normandy, France. Lophostropheus is one of the few dinosaurs that may have survived the Triassic–Jurassic extinction event.

Lophostropheus was a small to medium-sized, moderately-built, ground-dwelling, bipedal carnivore, that could grow up to 3 m (9.8 ft) long. Over the years it had been incorrectly classified as Halticosaurus and Liliensternus, but was later recognized as a new genus and was reassigned to Lophostropheus in 2007.

== Etymology ==
Lophostropheus was described and named by Argentine paleontologist Martin Ezcurra (Museo Argentino de Ciencias Naturales) and French paleontologist Gilles Cuny of the Université Pierre et Marie Curie in 2007, and the type species is Lophostropheus airelensis. The composite term Lophostropheus is derived from the Greek words "lophè" (λόφη) meaning "crest" and the word "stropheus" (στροφεύς) meaning "pertaining to the vertebrae"; thus, "crest vertebrae". This naming is a reference to the prominent dorsal and ventral laminae observed in the cranial cervical vertebrae. The specific name, "airelensis" is a reference to the locality where the specimen was discovered, the Airel Quarry.

== Description ==
Estimates suggest that Lophostropheus was at best 3 m (10 ft) long and weighed 100 kilograms (220 pounds) at most. In 2016 Molina-Pérez and Larramendi gave a higher estimation of 5.2 meters (17 ft) and 136 kg (300 lbs). It is based on a partial skeleton first described in 1966 as a specimen of Halticosaurus.

== Classification ==
Lophostropheus differs from other theropods in several ways. It has features reminiscent of more derived theropods, such as having a ball connection to the front of its neck vertebrae, a socket connection to the front of its tail vertebrae, and a vertical ridge on the ilium. These characteristics have all been interpreted as convergences, however. It also has prominent crests on the tops and bottoms of its neck vertebrae (for which it was named), and an extra pair of cavities in its neck vertebrae, unlike Liliensternus. It was closer to the coelophysids, including the well-known Coelophysis, than to Liliensternus. It has been assigned to the superfamily Coelophysoidea. An analysis of early dinosaurs by Baron, Norman and Barrett (2017) placed Lophostropheus in a position close to the derived theropods Sinosaurus and Cryolophosaurus.

=== Distinguishing anatomical features ===
A diagnosis is a statement of the anatomical features of an organism (or group) that collectively distinguish it from all other organisms. Some, but not all, of the features in a diagnosis are also autapomorphies. An autapomorphy is a distinctive anatomical feature that is unique to a given organism or group.

According to Ezcurra and Cuny (2007), Lophostropheus can be distinguished based on the following characteristics:

- a moderately convex anterior articular surface of the anterior postaxial cervical vertebrae (also present in Ceratosauria+Tetanurae)
- the last dorsal vertebral centrum has a large and oval lateral fossa (also observed in Herrerasaurus)
- the last dorsal vertebra has a dorsoventrally well-extended hyposphene
- an incipient concavity is present on the cranial articular surface of the cranial caudal vertebrae (also present in Ceratosauria+Tetanurae)
- the constant length of the caudal vertebrae along the length of the tail (also in Dilophosaurus)

== History of discovery ==
In 1966, the French paleontologists Claude Larsonneur and Albert-Félix de Lapparent described a partial theropod skeleton from the Triassic-Jurassic boundary of Normandy, found in 1959 by Claude Pareyn, as Halticosaurus sp. This specimen consisted of a tooth, five neck vertebrae, two vertebrae from the back, four sacral vertebrae, tail vertebrae, portions of all the pelvic bones, and an unidentified fragment. It was reinterpreted in 1993 by Gilles Cuny and Peter Galton as belonging to a new species, assigned to Liliensternus and named L. airelensis. Other researchers began to notice differences between L. airelensis and the type species, L. liliensterni, such as those observed in the pleurocoels of the cervical vertebrae, and in 2007, Martin Ezcurra and Gilles Cuny assigned it to its own genus, Lophostropheus.

Teeth found after a landslide on the German river Prüm in 2024 are thought to belong to a Lophostropheus and are among the first dinosaur remains ever found in Rhineland-Palatinate.

== Paleobiology ==
Lophostropheus, as a coelophysoid, would have been a small to medium-sized bipedal carnivore, probably comparable in size and habits to Liliensternus (best specimen estimated at 5.15 meters long, or 16.9 feet). Very few dinosaurs are known from its time period; in fact, it is the only theropod genus known from good remains at the Triassic-Jurassic boundary.

== Paleoecology ==
The remains of the type specimen of Lophostropheus airelensis was recovered in the Airel Quarry locality of the Moon-Airel Formation, in Basse-Normandie, France. The specimen was collected by Pareyn in 1959 in sandy claystone and lenticular, sandy limestone that was deposited on the boundary of the Rhaetian stage of the Triassic period and the Hettangian stage of the Jurassic period, approximately 205.6 to 196.5 million years ago. It is one of the few dinosaurs known to have lived during the Triassic-Jurassic boundary. Lophostropheus is one of the few dinosaurs that may have survived the Triassic–Jurassic extinction event when at least half of the known species living on Earth became extinct. This specimen is housed in the collection of Caen University in Normandy, France, and has not been assigned a collection number.
