= Löwenstein Formation =

Geologic formation in Germany

- Stratigraphic range: Mid Norian (Alaunian) 215.6–212 Ma
- Type: Geological formation
- Unit of: Keuper
- Underlies: Trossingen Formation
- Overlies: Mainhardt Formation
- Thickness: At least 80 m

Lithology
- Primary: Sandstone
- Other: Marl

Location
- Region: Europe
- Country: Germany, Switzerland
- Extent: Bavaria, Baden-Württemberg

The Löwenstein Formation (Stubensandstein in Baden-Württemberg, Burgsandstein in Bavaria) is a lithostratigraphic formation of the Keuper in Germany. It is underlain by the Mainhardt Formation and overlain by the Trossingen Formation. It dates back to the middle Norian.

== Fauna ==
Theropod tracks and an unnamed herrerasaur genus are known from the Lower Stubensandstein.

Color key: Taxon / Reclassified taxon / Taxon falsely reported as present / Dubious taxon or junior synonym / Ichnotaxon / Ootaxon / Morphotaxon	Notes; Uncertain or tentative taxa are in small text; ~~crossed out~~ taxa are discredited.

=== Archosaurs ===
==== Dinosaurs ====
===== Sauropodomorphs =====
Sauropodomorphs of the Stubensandstein
Genus	Species	Location	Stratigraphic position	Material	Notes	Images
Efraasia	E. minor		Lower			
Plateosaurus	P. gracilis		Middle; Lower	"[Twenty one] partial skeletons, isolated elements, [three] partial skulls, juvenile to adult."	Yates assigned the type material of Sellosaurus gracilis to Plateosaurus gracilis	

===== Theropods =====
Theropods of the Stubensandstein
Genus	Species	Location	Stratigraphic position	Material	Notes	Images
Dolichosuchus	D. cristatus		Middle	"Tibia"	Actually indeterminate coelophysoid remains	
Halticosaurus	H. longotarsus		Middle	"Mandibular fragment, vertebrae, humerus, illium, femur, metatarsal."	Later found to be indeterminate coelophysoid remains	
Liliensternus	L. liliensterni					
Procompsognathus	P. triassicus		Middle	"Partial postcranial skeleton."		

==== Reptiles ====
Archosaurs of the Stubensandstein
Genus	Species	Location	Stratigraphic position	Material	Notes	Images
Aetosaurus	A. feratus		Lower			
Aetosaurus	A. crassicauda		Lower			
Apatosuchus	A. orbitoangulatus		Lower	"Partial skull"		
Mystriosuchus	M. ?					
Nicrosaurus	N. kapffi		Middle			
Nicrosaurus	N. meyeri		Middle			
Paratypothorax	P. andressi		Middle			
Saltoposuchus	S. connectens					
Saltoposuchus	S. longipes					
Tanystrosuchus	T. posthomus		Middle	" Neck vertebra"		
Teratosaurus	T. suevicus		Middle		Galton and Benton showed that Teratosaurus is actually a rauisuchian.	

=== Other Amniotes ===
- Cyclotosaurus mordax
- Metoposaurus diagnosticus

== See also ==
- List of dinosaur-bearing rock formations
- List of fossiliferous stratigraphic units in Germany
- List of fossiliferous stratigraphic units in Switzerland
