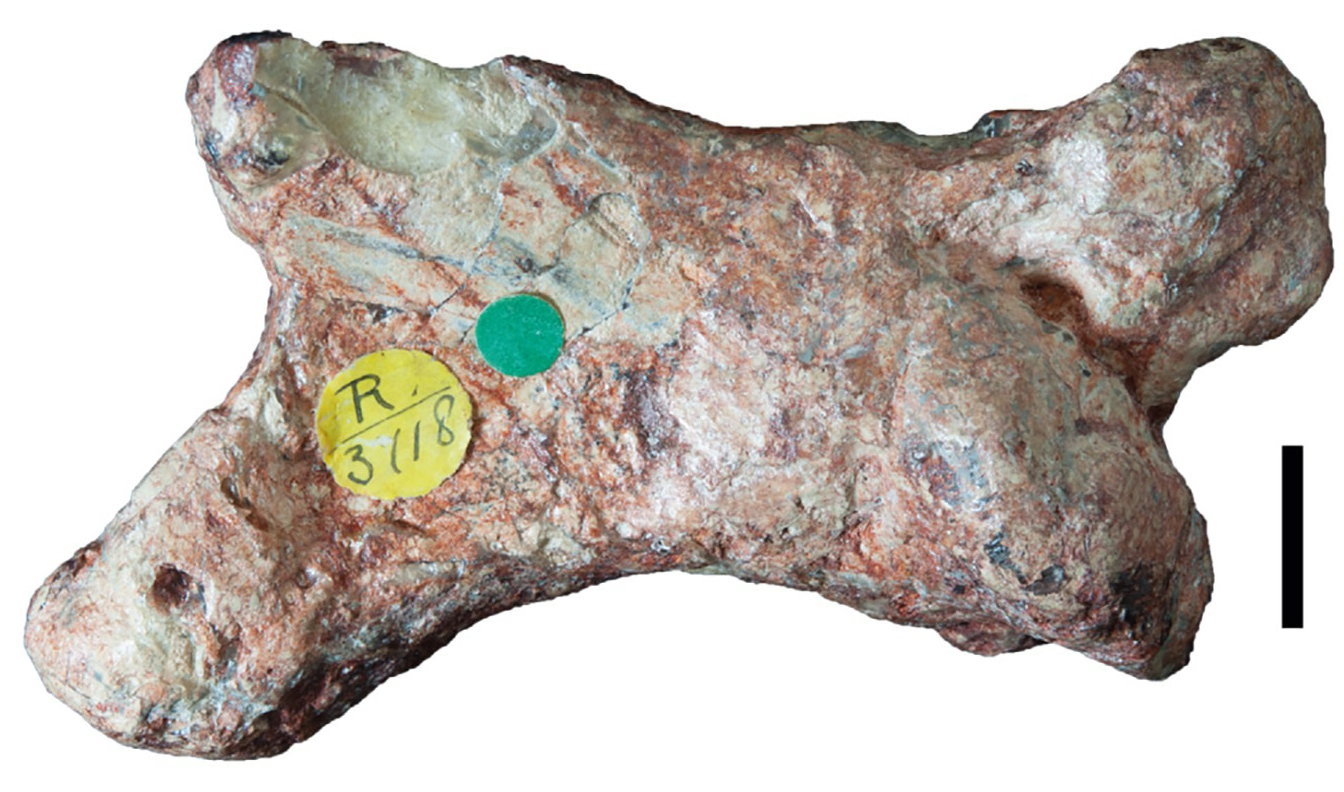
- Holotype metacarpal

Scientific classification
- Kingdom: Animalia
- Phylum: Chordata
- Class: Reptilia
- Clade: Dinosauria
- Clade: Saurischia
- Clade: Theropoda
- Clade: †Megaraptora
- Genus: †Rapator von Huene, 1932

Type species
- †Rapator ornitholestoides von Huene, 1932

Synonyms
- Walgettosuchus? von Huene, 1932

= Rapator =

Rapator Temporal range: Middle Cenomanian, 100.2–96.6 Ma

Extinct genus of dinosaurs

Rapator is a genus of theropod dinosaur from the Griman Creek Formation of New South Wales, Australia, dating to the Cenomanian age of the Cretaceous period. It contains only the type species, Rapator ornitholestoides, which was originally named by Friedrich von Huene in 1932.

== Discovery ==
Skeletal diagram showing holotype hand bone in place

The holotype and only known specimen, BMNH R3718, consists of a single opalised left hand bone, discovered around 1905 near Wollaston, on Lightning Ridge. The fossil has been opalised. The meaning of the generic name is problematic. Von Huene gave no etymology. "Rapator" does not exist in Classical Latin and occurs only very rarely in Mediaeval Latin with the meaning "violator". One possible explanation is that von Huene, having been influenced by Latin raptare, "to plunder", mistakenly thought such a word actually existed with the meaning of "plunderer". It has also been considered a simple misspelling of, or confusion with, raptor, "seizer" or "thief". The specific name means "resembling Ornitholestes". Remains of a megaraptorid, nicknamed "Lightning Claw," were discovered in opal fields southwest of Lightning Ridge, Australia, which may well represent more material of Rapator.

== Description ==
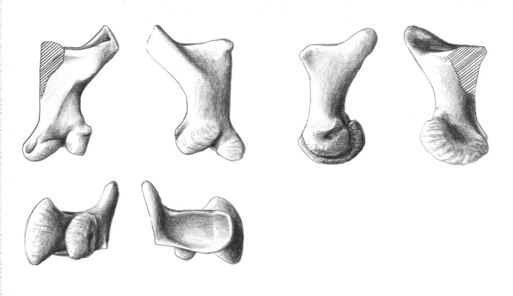
Illustration of holotype manual bone

The only known bone has a length of 7 centimetres (2.8 in). This manual element shows a prominent dorsomedial process, a feature shared with the much smaller Ornitholestes which occasioned the specific name. The process with Ornitholestes is much less distinctive though. On its upper end there is only one cotyle, from which von Huene deduced it must have been a metacarpal. However, several coelurosaurian groups also lack a second cotyle on the first phalanx. If Rapator had a build like Australovenator, it would have attained a considerable size: a body length of 9 metres (30 ft) has been estimated.

== Classification ==
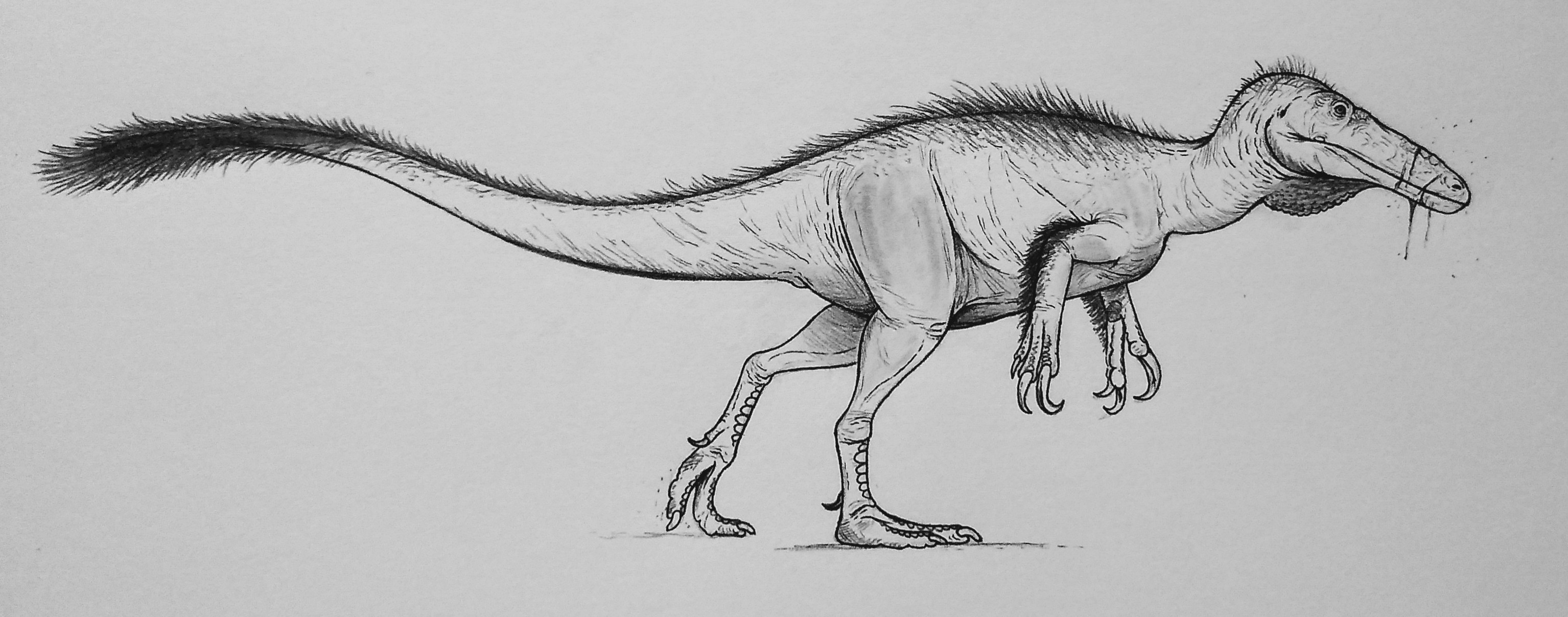
Hypothetical life restoration as a megaraptoran

The type specimen of Rapator was originally described as a metacarpal I, a bone from the upper part of a theropod's hand. It was later noted that the bone is similar to a finger bone, the first phalanx of the first finger, of an alvarezsaur or of a primitive coelurosaurian similar to Nqwebasaurus. With the discovery of Australovenator, which had a similar metacarpal, Rapator was recognized as a probable megaraptoran. In fact, Australovenator and Rapator differ only in some small details of the bone and may be synonyms, though Agnolin and colleagues in 2010 considered Rapator a dubious genus (nomen dubium) due to its fragmentary nature. However, White et al. found differences between the hand bone of Rapator and the equivalent bone of Australovenator, supporting the distinction between the two. They also noted that the two genera come from formations separated chronologically by at least 10 million years, making them unlikely to be synonymous.

The possible synonymy of Rapator with Walgettosuchus, a theropod found in the same formation, has been suggested. As the latter is only known from a caudal vertebra, which cannot be diagnosed beyond Theropoda, the identity cannot be proven.
