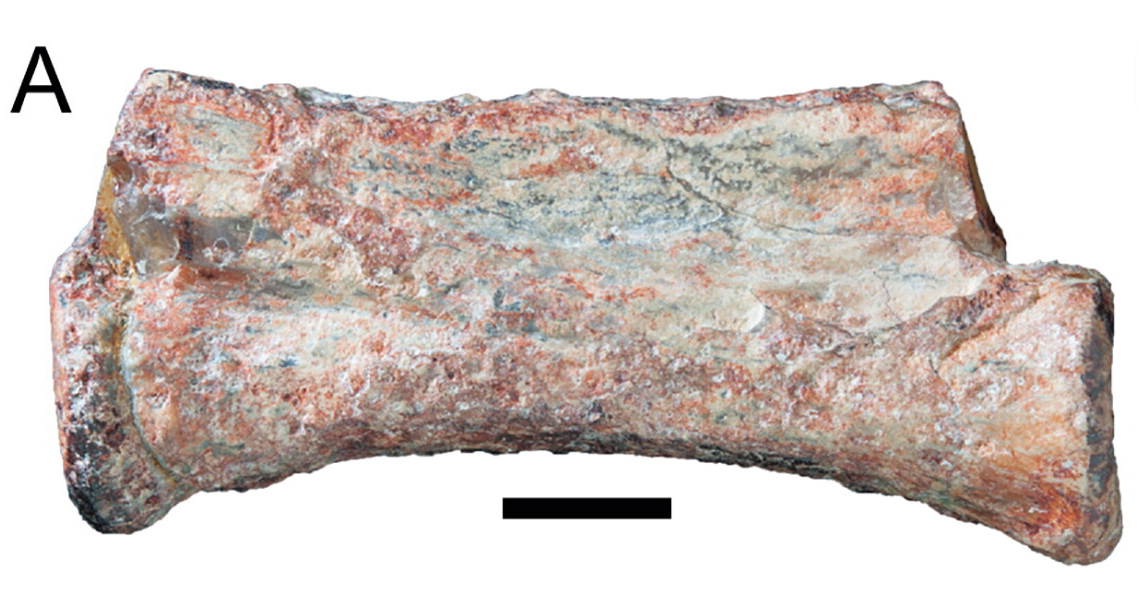
- Holotype caudal vertebra

Scientific classification
- Kingdom: Animalia
- Phylum: Chordata
- Class: Reptilia
- Clade: Dinosauria
- Clade: Saurischia
- Clade: Theropoda
- Genus: †Walgettosuchus von Huene, 1932
- Species: †W. woodwardi

Binomial name
- †Walgettosuchus woodwardi von Huene, 1932

Synonyms
- Rapator? von Huene, 1932

= Walgettosuchus =

Walgettosuchus Temporal range: Early-mid Cenomanian ~99–96 Ma

Extinct genus of dinosaurs

Walgettosuchus (meaning "Walgett crocodile") is a dubious or possibly invalid genus of extinct tetanuran theropod dinosaur that lived in Australia during the Late Cretaceous (Cenomanian). It is known from a single caudal vertebra.

== Discovery and naming ==
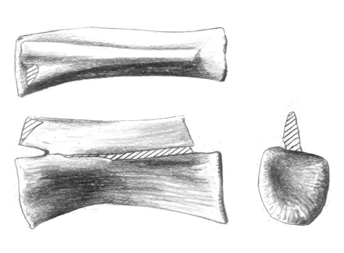
Holotype caudal vertebra drawn from three different angles

An opalised vertebra of a theropod dinosaur was discovered in 1905 by Tullie Cornthwaite Wollaston (May 17, 1863 – July 17, 1931) in an opal bearing sandstone at Lightning Ridge near Walgett, in New South Wales. The fossil was sent to the British Museum of Natural History and was reported in January 1909 by Arthur Smith Woodward. Following this, the specimen was briefly described by Woodward in 1910.

In 1932 the type species Walgettosuchus woodwardi was named by Friedrich von Huene, based on this vertebra. The generic name is derived from the town of Walgett and Soukhos, the Greek name of the Egyptian crocodile god Sobek. During the 1930s Von Huene tended to form dinosaur names with the ending ~suchus instead of ~saurus because of the closer relationship to crocodiles than to lizards. The specific name honours Woodward.

The holotype, BMNH R3717, was found in the Cenomanian-age Late Cretaceous Griman Creek Formation. It consists of a 63-millimetre (2.5 in) long incomplete amphicoelous caudal vertebral centrum. For unknown reasons, Von Huene believed it had elongate prezygapophyses. He also suggested that if more material was known, it could prove to be synonymous with other Lightning Ridge "coelurosaurs" (i.e. Rapator; coelurosaur in the outdated sense of any small theropod).

== Classification ==
Von Huene assigned Walgettosuchus to the Coelurosauria in 1932. In his 1990 review, Ralph Molnar noted that the type cannot be distinguished from tail vertebrae from ornithomimids or megaraptorids, and considered it to be an indeterminate theropod and a nomen dubium or (more likely) an invalid taxon.

=== Possible synonymy with Rapator ===
It is possible that Walgettosuchus and Rapator represent the same dinosaur, but this synonymy is impossible to prove as there is no known common fossil material between the two genera (Rapator is only known from a hand bone while Walgettosuchus is known from a vertebra).
