= Gleichamberg =

- Ortsteil of Römhild
- Coat of arms
- Interactive map of Gleichamberg
- Location within Germany Location within Thuringia
- Coordinates: 50°22′17″N 10°35′56″E
- Country: Germany
- State: Thuringia
- District: Hildburghausen
- Town: Römhild

Area
  - Total: 46.83 km^{2} (18.08 sq mi)
- Elevation: 330 m (1,080 ft)

Population (2011-12-31)
  - Total: 2,822
  - Density: 60.26/km^{2} (156.1/sq mi)
- Time zone: UTC+01:00 (CET)
  - Summer (DST): UTC+02:00 (CEST)
- Postal codes: 98646
- Dialling codes: 036875
- Vehicle registration: HBN
- Website: www.gleichamberg.de

Gleichamberg is a former municipality in the district of Hildburghausen in Thuringia. Since 31 December 2012, it is part of the town Römhild. Gleichamberg consisted of the following subdivisions:

- Buchenhof
- Bedheim
- Gleicherwiesen
- Eicha
- Simmershausen
- Zeilfeld
- Roth

== Coat of arms ==
Officially granted on 5 January 1993, the lower part of the shield shows the two dominating hills in the area, the greater and lesser Gleichberg. The scissors are taken from the arms of the family of Milz and their relatives the noble family of Scherenberg (the word Schere means "scissors" or "shears"). In the 15th century the family played a major role in the local history. The upper field is a type of prehistoric pin found in the Kleine Gleichberg. The colours are those of the arms of Rudolf von Scherenberg, as well as of the State of Würzburg, to which the area was once attached.

Coat of arms of Bedheim, depicting Liliensternus liliensterni
