= Delphaciognathus =

Scientific classification
- Domain: Eukaryota
- Kingdom: Animalia
- Phylum: Chordata
- Clade: Synapsida
- Genus: †Delphaciognathus; Broom, 1932

Extinct genus of synapsids

Delphaciognathus is an extinct genus of non-mammalian synapsids.

== See also ==
- List of therapsids
