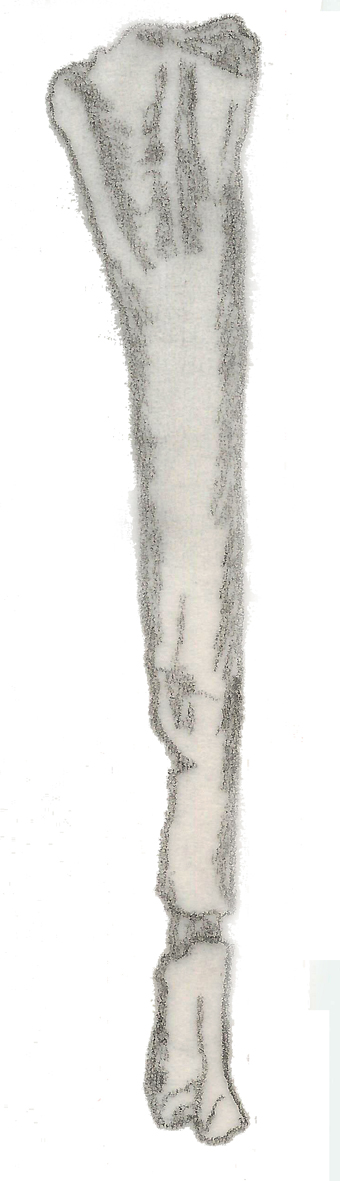
- Tibia

Scientific classification
- Kingdom: Animalia
- Phylum: Chordata
- Class: Reptilia
- Clade: Dinosauria
- Clade: Saurischia
- Clade: Theropoda
- Clade: Neotheropoda
- Superfamily: †Coelophysoidea
- Genus: †Dolichosuchus; Huene, 1932
- Species: †D. cristatus

Binomial name
- †Dolichosuchus cristatus Huene, 1932

= Dolichosuchus =

Dolichosuchus Temporal range: Norian ~208 Ma

Extinct genus of dinosaurs

Dolichosuchus (meaning "long crocodile") is the name given to a genus of dinosaur from the Triassic. It was originally classified in the disused family Hallopodidae, and has since been reclassified as a coelophysoid. A single fossil (consisting of a single lower leg bone, or tibia) was found in Germany (specimen NHMUK PV OR 38058). Since only one bone was discovered, the genus is considered a nomen dubium. Some scientists have said that the tibia closely resembles those of Liliensternus and Dilophosaurus.

The type species is D. cristatus, described by Huene in 1932. The bone was recovered from the Lower or Middle Stubensandstein formation.
