= Halticosaurus =

Halticosaurus Temporal range: Norian ~215.6–208 Ma

Scientific classification
- Kingdom: Animalia
- Phylum: Chordata
- Class: Reptilia
- Clade: Dinosauria
- Clade: Saurischia
- Clade: Theropoda
- Family: †Halticosauridae; Bock, 1952
- Genus: †Halticosaurus; Huene, 1908
- Species: †H. longotarsus

Binomial name
- †Halticosaurus longotarsus Huene, 1908

Extinct genus of dinosaurs

Halticosaurus (pron.:"HAL-tick-oh-SORE-us") is a dubious genus of theropod dinosaur from the late Triassic period (middle Norian stage, around 215.6–208 million years ago). It is known from a single fragmentary fossil specimen of the species H. longotarsus, found in the Middle Stubensandstein formation of what is present-day Germany The only known specimen was poorly preserved and may have been put together from bones of unrelated animals. Further research would be required to determine which of the bones belonged together, and what kind of theropod Halticosaurus was. However, most of the bones have been lost. For these reasons, Halticosaurus is considered to be a nomen dubium.

== Etymology ==
The name Halticosaurus comes from the Greek words altikos (αλτικος) meaning "good at jumping"/"nimble" and sauros (σαυρος) meaning "lizard"; thus "nimble lizard". Halticosaurus was described and named by Friedrich von Huene in 1908 and the type species is Halticosaurus longotarsus.

== Description ==
Halticosaurus longotarsus, is known from the holotype SMNS 12353, which consists of partial jaw bones and teeth, incomplete neck, back, hip and tail vertebrae, a partial humerus, two partial femora, and fragments of an ilium and a metatarsal. The specimen was discovered in the Middle Stubensandstein Member of the Löwenstein Formation in Baden-Württemberg, Germany. It was recovered by A. Burrer, G. Mayer, and E. Fraas in 1902, at the Burrerschen Quarry, in gray/blue marl that was deposited during the Norian stage of the Triassic period, approximately 215-212 million years ago. The specimen is currently housed in the collection of the State Museum of Natural History Stuttgart in Stuttgart, Germany. von Huene named Halticosaurus orbitoangulatus in 1932 on the basis of a mangled skull also from the Middle Stubensandstein, but it is now considered to have belonged to the indeterminate loricatan archosaur Apatosuchus. He also named Halticosaurus lilliensterni in 1934, but it became the new genus Liliensternus in 1984.

According to Welles (1984) H. longotarsus could be distinguished from the similar species Liliensternus liliensterni based on the following features:

- the lower jaw is shallower and is pointed more in the front
- shorter and taller middle neck vertebrae are present
- a sharp keel is present on the bottom of the middle neck vertebrae
- the hip vertebrae are narrower
- lower third hip vertebra than in Liliensternus
- a more outwardly placed front trochanter
- the presence of smaller distal condyles on metatarsal II which extend less far proximally on shaft

In 1992, Michael Benton noted that the skull was 18 inches (46 cm) long but was lightly built, with large fenestrae. The legs of the specimen were strong, and its arms were relatively short. Benton estimated that Halticosaurus would have been about 5.5 m (18.0 ft) long.

However, the fossil material used by these previous researchers was later found to be mixed together with the remains of other animals, including a sauropodomorph (Sellosaurus gracilis). In 2000, Rauhut and Hungerbühler re-examined the fossil material and concluded that only the two partial femora could be reliably referred to H. longotarsus.

== Classification ==
In 1908, Huene originally assigned this genus broadly to Dinosauria, and after additional analysis in 1909 he assigned Halticosaurus to Saurischia. In 1952, Bock observed enough unique skeletal features to assign it to its own family Halticosauridae. Welles (1984) and Chatterjee (1987) later agreed with this classification. Over the years there was an effort to refer Halticosaurus to Podokesauridae by paleontologists like Simmons (1965), Ostrom (1978), Battail (1986) and Carroll (1988). In their attempt at phylogenetic analysis, Norman (1990) and later, Rauhut and Hungerbuhler (2000) concluded that Halticosaurus was indeterminate because the available material is too poorly preserved.

A second species, based on a partial skull SMNS 12353b was assigned to this genus as cf. Halticosaurus orbitoangulatus in 1932. In 2000, Rauhut and Hungerbuhler reassigned this material to the genus Saltoposuchus, a crocodylomorph, based on the morphology of the teeth and the antorbital fenestra in the skull. A new genus name, Apatosuchus, was created for this specimen by Hans-Dieter Sues and Rainer R. Schoch in 2013 when they realized that it represented a primitive loricatan archosaur rather than a dinosaur or a crocodylomorph, as a result of further preparation of the specimen.

A third species, H. liliensterni, was reclassified as Liliensternus by Welles. Mortimer (2011) noted that between 1934 and 1984, Liliensternus was incorrectly considered to be a species of Halticosaurus.
