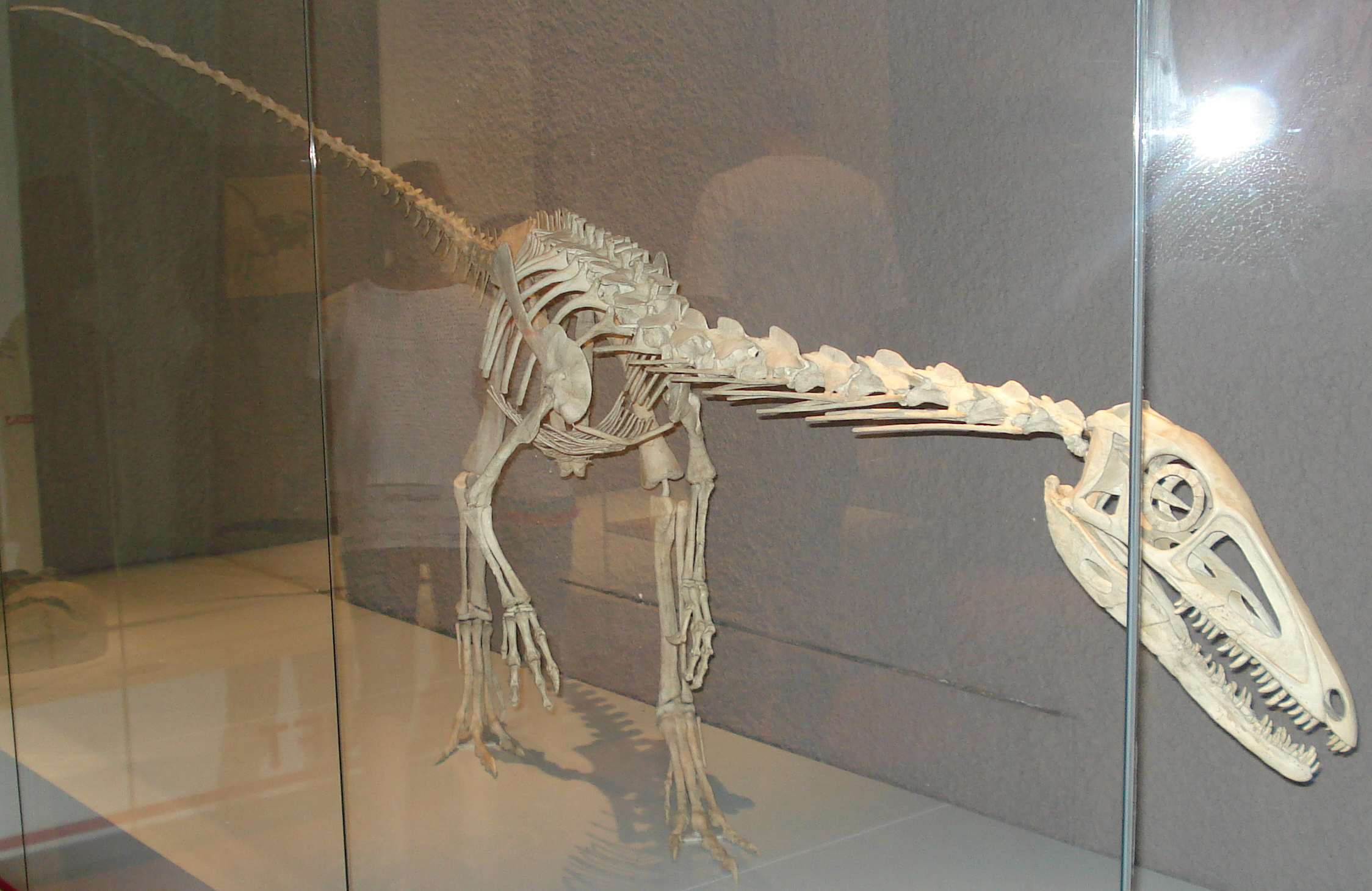
- Reconstructed skeleton cast

Scientific classification
- Kingdom: Animalia
- Phylum: Chordata
- Class: Reptilia
- Clade: Dinosauria
- Clade: Saurischia
- Clade: Theropoda
- Superfamily: †Coelophysoidea (?)
- Genus: †Liliensternus; Welles, 1984

Type species
- †Liliensternus liliensterni Huene, 1934

Synonyms
- Halticosaurus liliensternus Huene, 1934

= Liliensternus =

Liliensternus Temporal range: Late Triassic, 228–201.3 Ma

Extinct genus of dinosaurs

Liliensternus is an extinct genus of basal neotheropod dinosaur that lived approximately 210 million years ago during the latter part of the Triassic Period in what is now Germany. Liliensternus was a bipedal, ground-dwelling carnivore, that could grow up to 5.15 m (16.9 ft) long; however, this size estimate is based on specimens now believed to be subadults, and possible fragmentary remains indicate an adult length of 7 to 9 meters. It is the best represented Triassic theropod from Europe and one of the largest known.

== Description ==
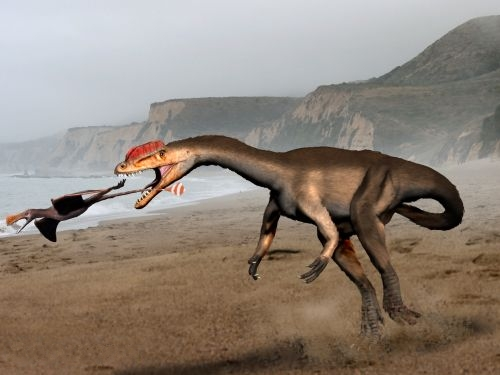
Liliensternus restored with a speculative crest.

Liliensternus was approximately 5.15 metres (16.9 feet) long, and may have weighed about 127 kilograms (280 pounds). Other estimates suggest that Liliensternus was at best 5.2 m (17.1 ft) long and weighed 200 kg (441 lb) at most. The remains of two specimens of Liliensternus together form a syntype series with inventory number MB.R.2175, and consist of the partial and fragmentary skeletons of at least two individuals, containing elements of the skull, the lower jaws, the vertebrae and the appendicular skeleton. The tibia (409 mm) is shorter than the femur (440 mm) in both Dilophosaurus and Liliensternus, unlike those of coelophysid taxa, such as Coelophysis. Paul (1988) noted that based on its appearance, Liliensternus could be considered to be an intermediate between Coelophysis and Dilophosaurus. Although the skull is not well known, many reconstructions have Liliensternus with a crest similar to that observed in Dilophosaurus. Its ilium (hip bone) is unusually short, as is the case with Dilophosaurus.

Rauhut et al. (1998) noted that the remains may represent a juvenile or subadult individual based on the presence of only two fused sacrals and the fact that the neurocentral sutures are still visible in the vertebrae. In a 2024 conference abstract, Kirmse et al. supported this hypothesis. They reported fragmentary remains of several large theropods, either adult Liliensternus or a closely related genus, that suggest an adult length of 7 to 9 meters, making Liliensternus possibly the largest theropod dinosaur known from the Triassic period.

A diagnosis is a statement of the anatomical features of an organism (or group) that collectively distinguish it from all other organisms. Some, but not all, of the features in a diagnosis are also autapomorphies. An autapomorphy is a distinctive anatomical feature that is unique to a given organism or group. According to Rauhut (2000), Liliensternus can be distinguished based on the following features: the cervical vertebrae feature a broad rounded ridge that extends from the posterior end of the diapophyses to the posteroventral end of the vertebral centrum, one pair of pleurocoels in the cervical vertebrae, a less developed infradiapophyseal fossa, the absence of a horizontal ridge at the basis of the cervical neural spines, absence of a lateral bulge on the ilium.

== Discovery ==
Coat of arms of Bedheim, depicting L. liliensterni

The specimens of Liliensternus, designated as the syntype series HMN BM.R.2175, were recovered near Großer Gleichberg in the Trossingen Formation of the Middle Keuper Group in Thuringia, Germany, together with remains of Ruehleia. The syntypes were discovered by Count Hugo Rühle von Lilienstern in the winter of 1932/1933 in marlstone (lime-rich mudstone) deposited in the Norian stage of the Late Triassic period, approximately 228 to 208 million years ago. A left metatarsal later assigned to this genus, also deposited in the Norian, was collected in 1834 in the sandstone of the Trossingen Formation in Bayern, Germany. This metatarsal was originally described as a manual or pedal element by Meyer (1855) and a pubic fragment by Huene (1908) of Plateosaurus, and the material was re-identified as a proximal metatarsal belonging to Liliensternus by Moser in 2003. Sander (1992) referred additional material to Liliensternus, which was thought to have been collected in 1961 grey/green marlstone from the Löwenstein Formation in Aargau, Switzerland, which is considered to also be from the Norian stage of the Late Triassic period. A tooth referred to this Liliensternus, deposited in the Norian, and collected in 1913 in dark red mudstone from the Löwenstein Formation in Baden-Württemberg, Germany. The only material assigned to this genus from later strata was discovered in 1913 in blue claystone from the Rhaetian stage of the Late Triassic, in the Trossingen Formation from Sachsen-Anhalt, Germany, approximately 208 to 201 million years ago. The Liliensternus specimens remained in Hugo Rühle von Lilienstern's castle until 1969 when they were transferred to the collection of the Natural History Museum of Berlin, their present location.

The genus and specific names Liliensternus liliensterni are derived from the last name of count, amateur paleontologist, and medical doctor, Hugo Rühle von Lilienstern. This dinosaur was named in his honor for his furthering paleontology in Germany by founding a paleontological museum in his castle in Bedheim, on 1 July 1934. Liliensternus was described by Friedrich von Huene in 1934. Because it was originally named by von Huene as a member of the genus Halticosaurus, the type species of the genus Liliensternus is Halticosaurus liliensternus; the combinatio nova is Liliensternus liliensterni.

In 1993 Gilles Cuny and Peter Galton described a new species that they assigned to this genus, Liliensternus airelensis. Other researchers began to notice differences between L. airelensis and the type species, L. liliensternus, and in 2007, Martin Ezcurra and Cuny assigned the material to its own genus, Lophostropheus.

== Classification ==
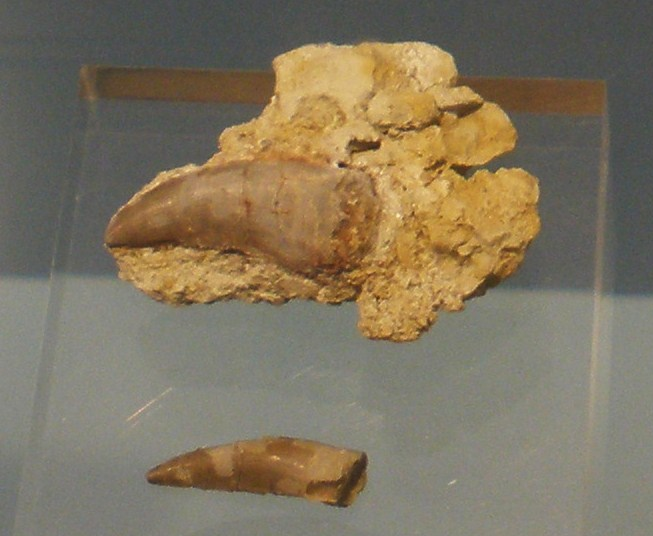
Teeth assigned to Liliensternus sp.

In 1934, Huene described two skeletons assigning them the name Halticosaurus liliensternus, but in 1984 Samuel Paul Welles concluded that the type species of Halticosaurus, H. longotarsus, was a nomen dubium. Most of what had been written in the literature about Halticosaurus in fact regarded H. liliensternus. Welles therefore erected a new genus: Liliensternus, the name again honoring Rühle von Lilienstern. The new species name became Liliensternus liliensterni. Rowe (1989) found that Liliensternus is more derived than Dilophosaurus. A second species named in 1993 by Cuny and Galton for fragmentary remains found in France, Liliensternus airelensis, which had an extra pair of cervical pleurocoels, was in 2007 reassigned to a separate genus, Lophostropheus. Originally assigned to the Halticosauridae, Liliensternus is today considered a basal member of the Neotheropoda.

The following evolutionary tree illustrates a synthesis of the relationships of the early theropod groups compiled by Hendrickx et al. in 2015, including the position of Liliensternus in which all studies concur.

- Neotheropoda
  - Coelophysidae
  - - Liliensternus
    - - Zupaysaurus
      - - Dilophosauridae
          - Dilophosaurus
          - Dracovenator
        - Averostra
          - Ceratosauria
          - Tetanurae
            - Cryolophosaurus
            - Sinosaurus
            - - Monolophosaurus
              - Orionides

== Paleoecology ==
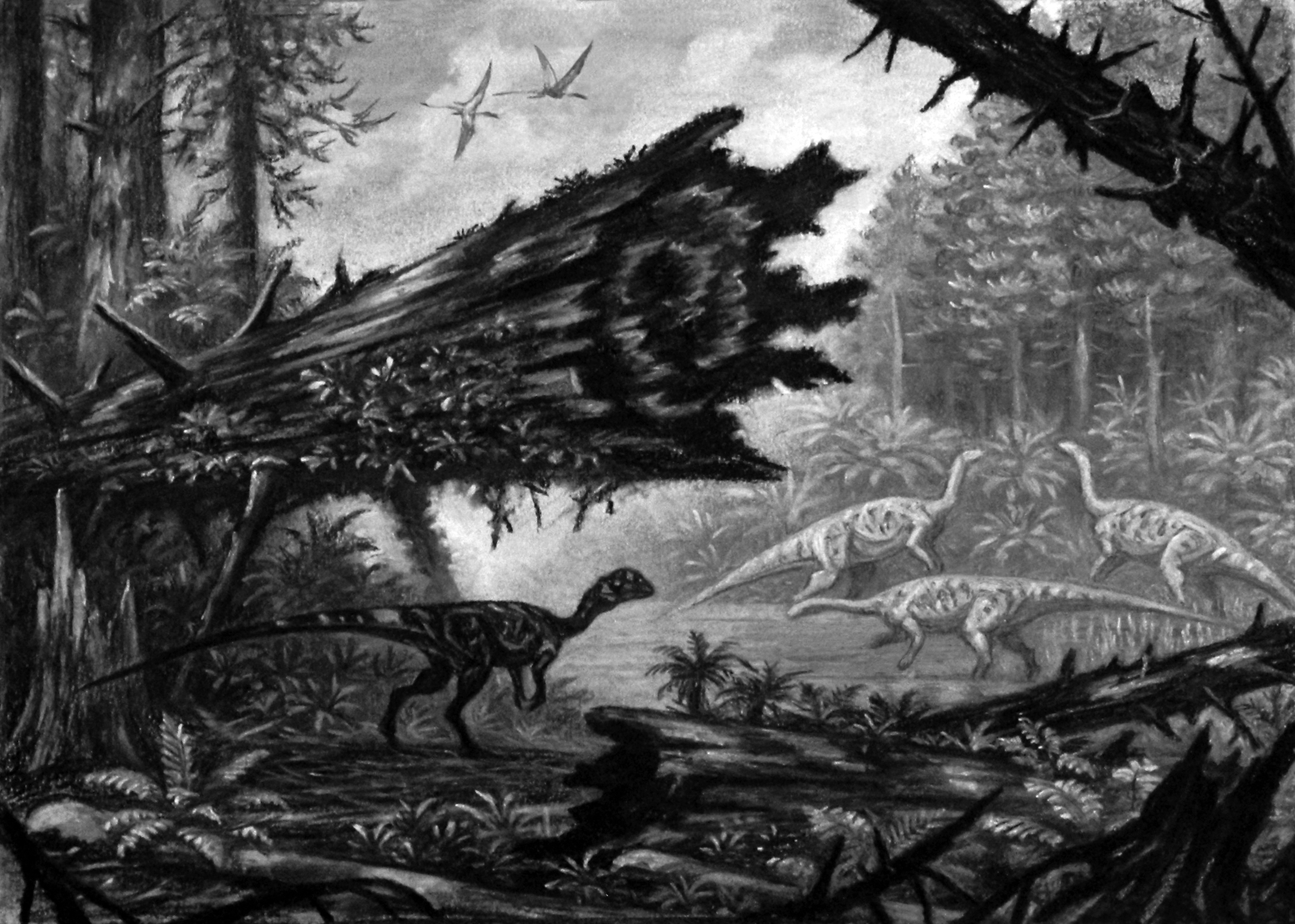
Restoration of Liliensternus (foreground) in its environment, with Plateosaurus in the background

Liliensternus was an active bipedal carnivore that could have preyed on the larger herbivores like Plateosaurus, which were present in its paleoenvironment. The material discovered in Switzerland, Sachsen-Anhalt, Germany and the tooth from Baden-Württemberg, Germany, suggest that Liliensternus inhabited ancient floodplains that were abundant with reptiles, therapsids, and Plateosaurus. Paul (1988) noted that Liliensternus used its slashing tooth arrays to disable prosauropods and its speed to catch swift ornithischians.

== See also ==
- Timeline of coelophysoid research
