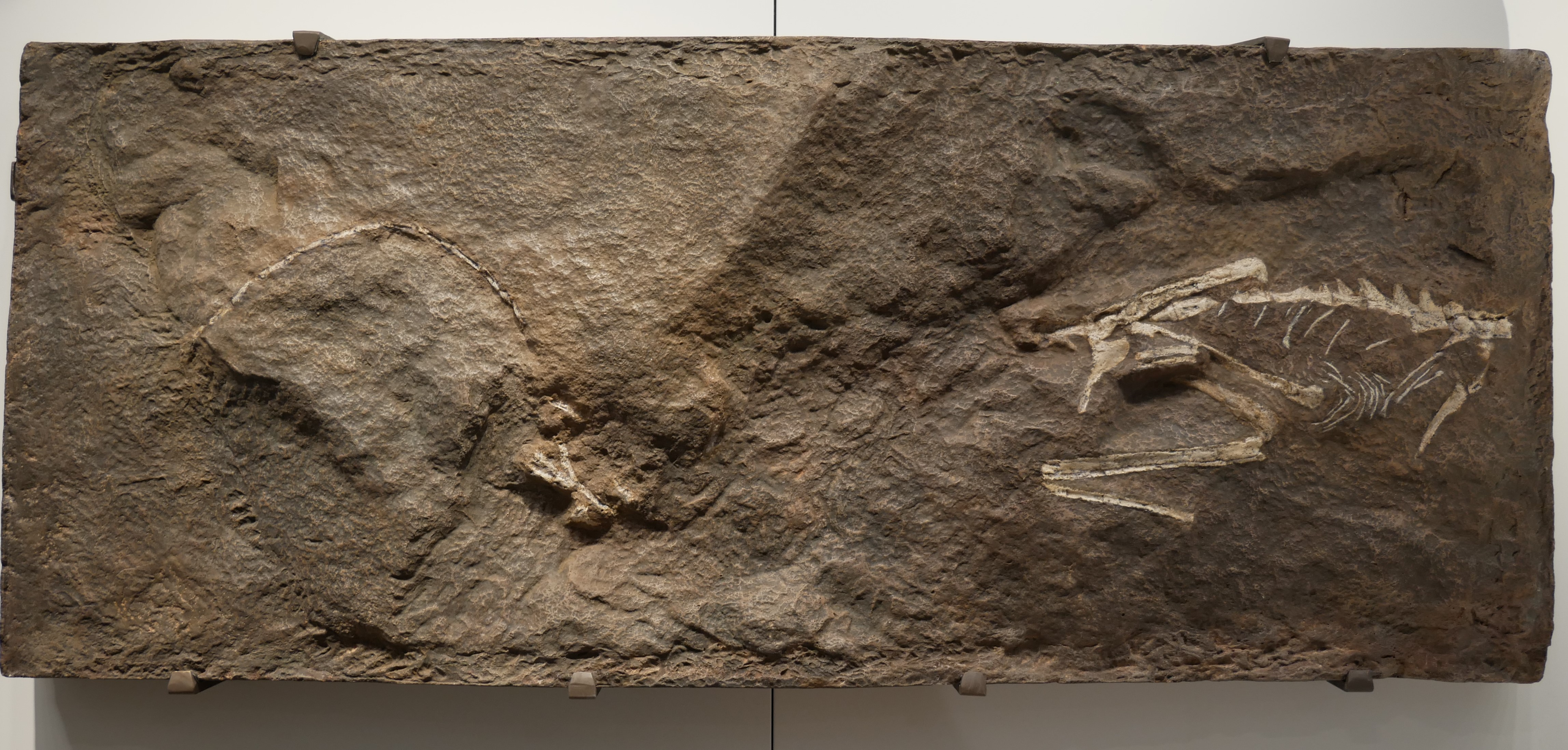
- Cast of the holotype specimen at the Yale Peabody Museum of Natural History; the tail and uncertain bones are at left, the body at right

Scientific classification
- Kingdom: Animalia
- Phylum: Chordata
- Class: Reptilia
- Clade: Dinosauria
- Clade: Saurischia
- Clade: Theropoda
- Superfamily: †Coelophysoidea
- Genus: †Podokesaurus; Talbot, 1911
- Species: †P. holyokensis

Binomial name
- †Podokesaurus holyokensis Talbot, 1911

Synonyms
- Coelophysis holyokensis (Talbot, 1911) Colbert, 1964

= Podokesaurus =

Podokesaurus Temporal range: Early Jurassic, 190 Ma

Coelophysoid theropod dinosaur genus from Early Jurassic Period

Podokesaurus is a genus of coelophysoid dinosaur that lived in what is now the eastern United States during the Early Jurassic Period. The first fossil was discovered by the geologist Mignon Talbot near Mount Holyoke, Massachusetts, in 1910. The specimen was fragmentary, preserving much of the body, limbs, and tail. In 1911, Talbot described and named the new genus and species Podokesaurus holyokensis based on it. The full name can be translated as "swift-footed lizard of Holyoke". This discovery made Talbot the first woman to find and describe a non-bird dinosaur. The holotype fossil was recognized as significant and was studied by other researchers, but was lost when the building it was kept in burned down in 1917; no unequivocal Podokesaurus specimens have since been discovered. It was made state dinosaur of Massachusetts in 2022.

Estimated to have been about 1 m (3 ft) in length and 1–40 kg (2–90 lb) in weight, Podokesaurus was lightly constructed with hollow bones, and would have been similar to Coelophysis, being slender, long-necked, and with sharp, recurved teeth. The vertebrae were very light and hollow, and some were slightly concave at each end. The cervical (neck) vertebrae were relatively large in length and diameter compared to the dorsal (back) vertebrae, and the caudal (tail) vertebrae were long and slender. The humerus (upper-arm bone) was small and delicate, less than half the length of the femur (thigh-bone). The pubis (pubic bone) was very long, expanding both at the front and hind ends. The femur was slender, nearly straight, had thin walls, and was expanded at the back side of its lower end. The three metatarsals of the lower leg were closely appressed together forming a compact structure.

Since it was one of the few small theropods known at the time it was described, the affinities of Podokesaurus were long unclear. It was placed in the family Podokesauridae along with other small theropods, and was speculated to have been similar to a proto-bird. It was suggested it was a synonym of Coelophysis and a natural cast specimen was assigned to it, but these ideas are not currently accepted. The family Podokesauridae is not in use anymore, having been replaced by Coelophysidae, and Podokesaurus is thought to have been a coelophysoid. As such, Podokesaurus would have been a fleet-footed predator, with powerful forelimbs and grasping hands. It is estimated it could have run at 15–20 km/h (9–12 mph). Podokesaurus is thought to have been collected from the Portland Formation, the age of which has long been unclear, but is currently believed to date to the Hettangian–Sinemurian stages of the Early Jurassic, between 201 and 190 million years ago.

== Discovery and history ==
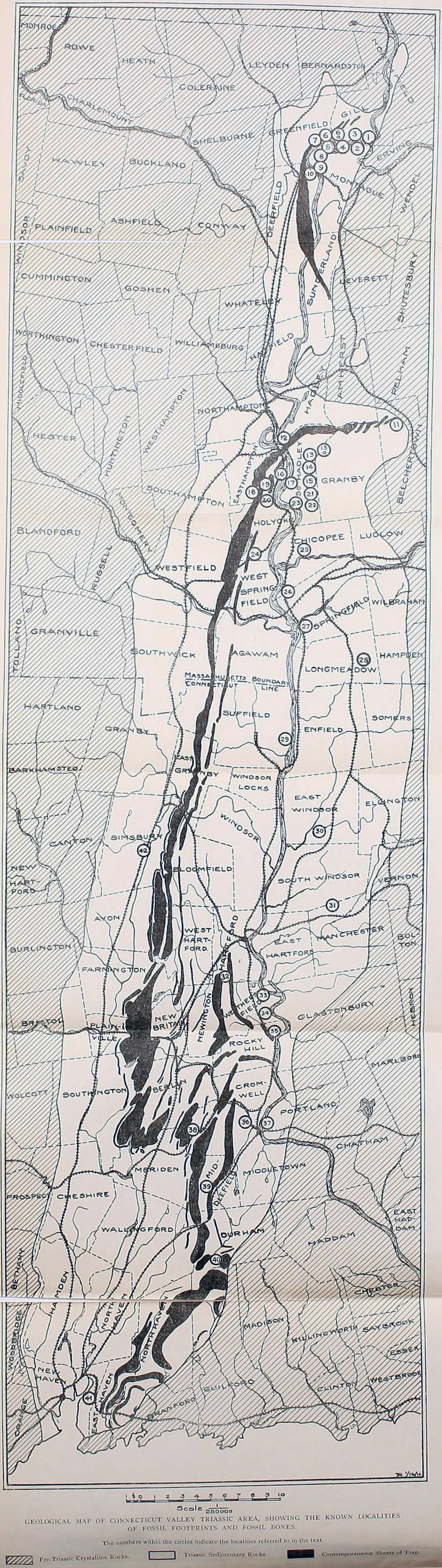
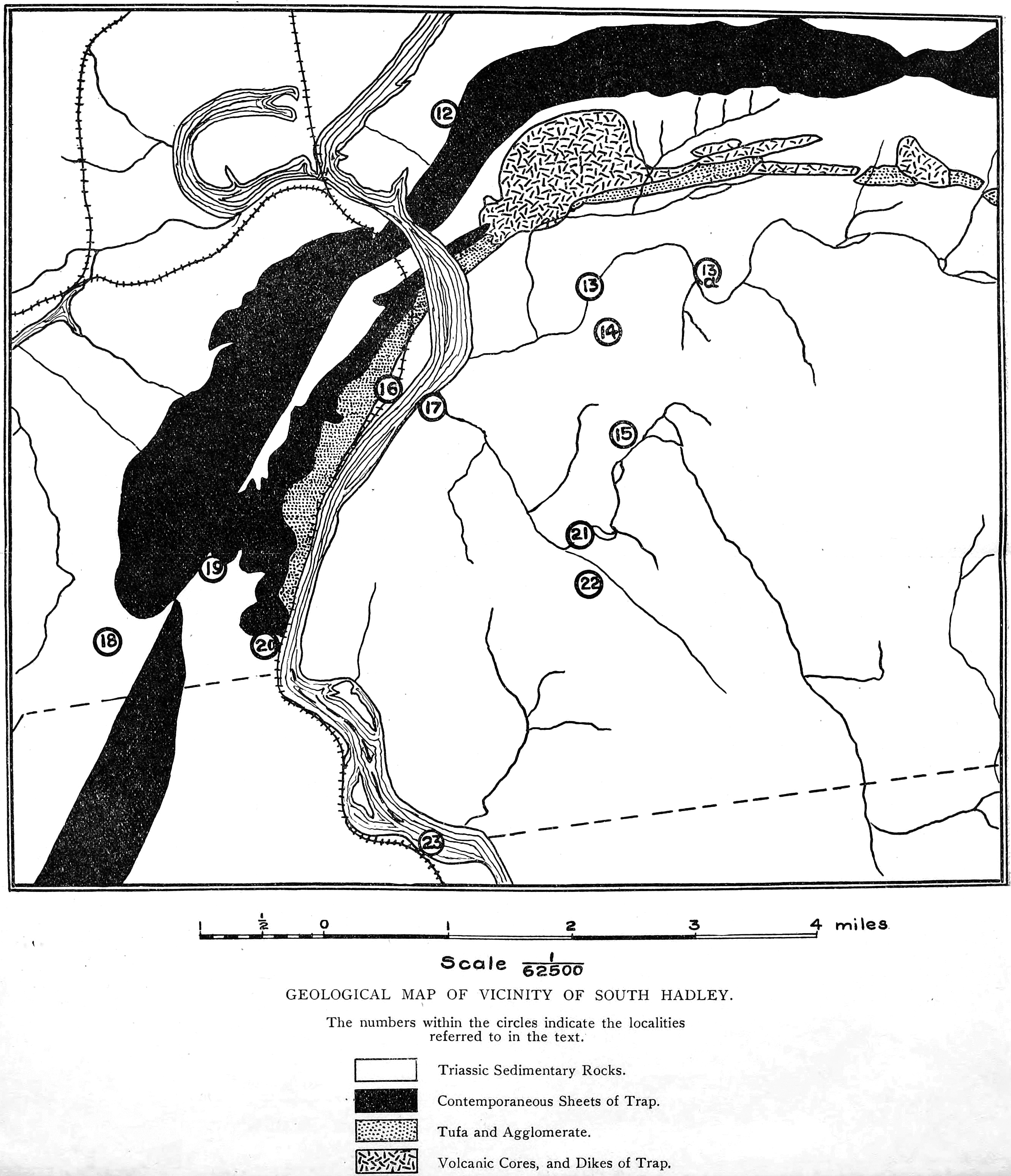
Geological maps of the Connecticut Valley from 1915; 22 is where Podokesaurus was found, 12 is Mount Holyoke (some areas marked as Triassic are now thought to be Early Jurassic in age)

In 1910, the American geologist Mignon Talbot was walking with her sister Ellen to Holyoke, Massachusetts, in the eastern US, when they passed a farm and noticed a small hill nearby. It had a gravel pit at one side, and was formed by an accumulation of sand, gravel, and boulders left by a receding glacier. Talbot noticed a white streak on a sandstone boulder at the bottom of the gravel pit, and upon discovering these were bones, she told her sister she had found a "real live fossil". This was because many fossil tracks had previously been discovered in the Connecticut Valley (that she had often taken her students to see), but few actual dinosaur skeletons, and none at Mount Holyoke. She was granted permission by the land owner to collect the specimen for Mount Holyoke College (an all-women's college a few miles from there), where she was head of the geology department.

The next day she brought a group of workmen to collect the specimen, and found another piece of sandstone that contained the rest of the fossil as well as impressions of those in the first slab. The specimen appeared to have been exposed for years with no one noticing it, the boulder having been broken open by people or frost. The fossil was brought to the laboratory where it was prepared and photographed. The incomplete specimen preserved 5 cervical (neck), 11 dorsal (back) and 24 caudal (tail) vertebrae, a fragment of the left scapula (shoulder blade) and right coracoid (part of the pectoral girdle), a partial left humerus (upper arm bone), phalanx bones of 3 fingers, including 2 unguals (claw bones), ribs, the pubis and ischium (bones forming the lower front and lower back of the pelvis, respectively), the femora (thigh bones), the left tibia (lower leg bone), a fragment of the right astragalus (a bone in the ankle), articulated metatarsals (foot bones) of the left foot, followed by 3 pedal phalanges (toe bones), partial metatarsals and possible phalanges of the right foot, and fragments of uncertain identity. The light and delicate bones were in their natural position or nearly so within the rock, except for the tail and uncertain fragments, which were a few centimeters away from the skeleton, following a long gap in the skeleton behind the pelvis. The front half of the neck was missing.

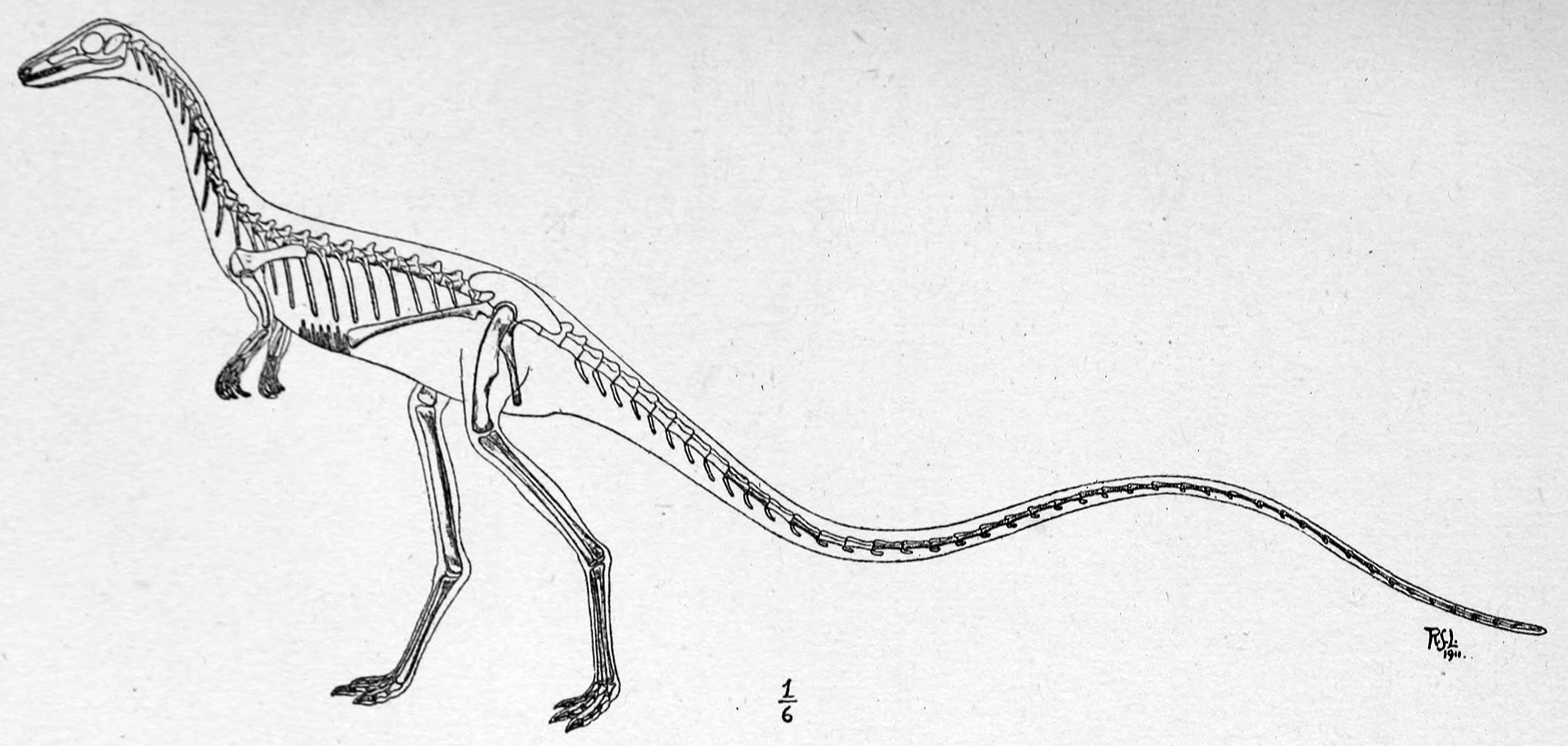
1915 skeletal reconstruction by Richard Swann Lull; shaded areas were known from the fossil, missing parts were reconstructed after Compsognathus

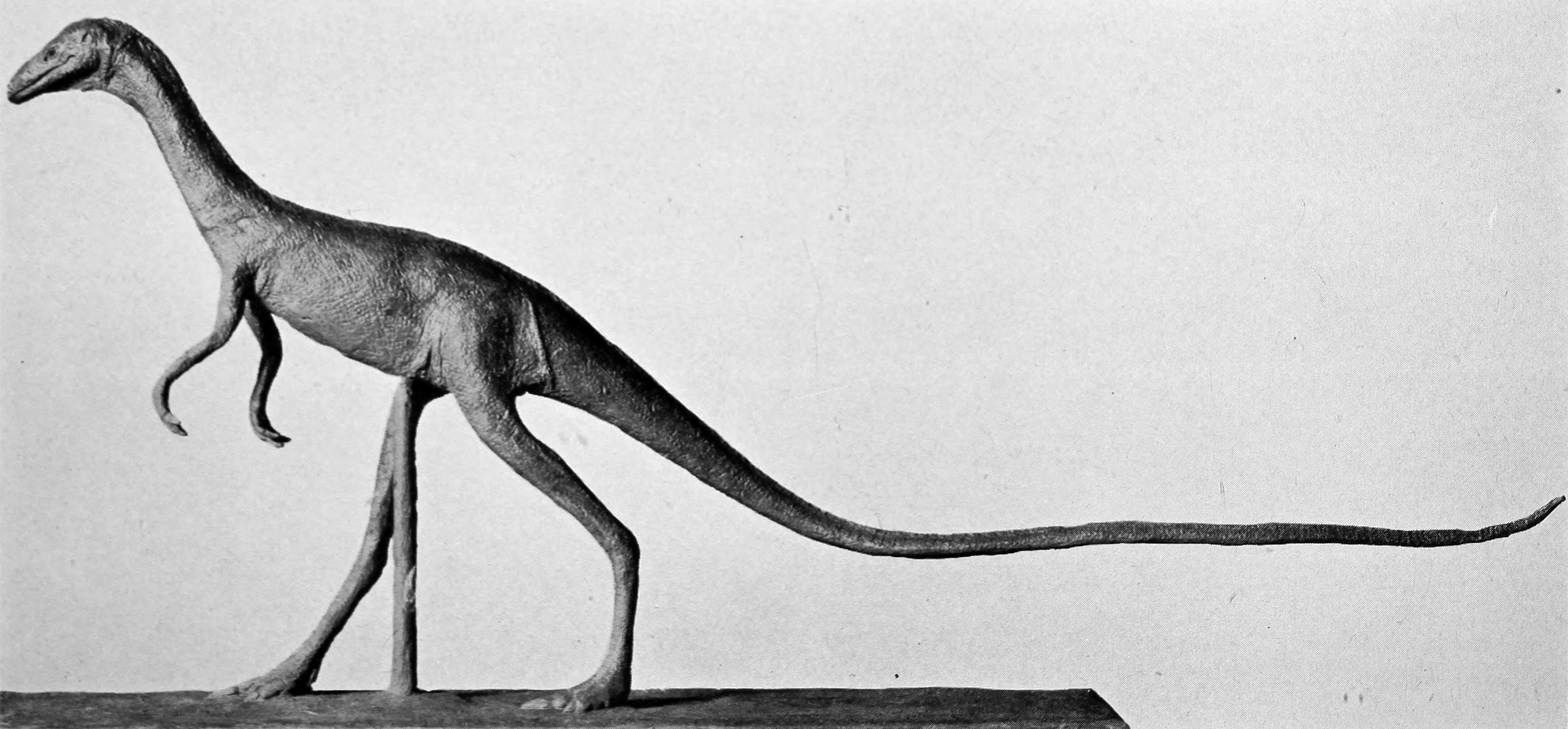
Model by Lull at the Peabody Museum

The significance of the fossil was confirmed at an intercollegiate meeting of geology departments, and when the American paleontologist Richard Swann Lull subsequently encouraged Talbot to describe the specimen, she replied she did not know anything about dinosaurs, but Lull suggested she should study them and then describe it. In December 1910, Talbot read a preliminary description of the fossil at the Paleontological Society meeting at Pittsburgh, and in June 1911 she published a short scientific description, in which she made the specimen the holotype of the new genus and species Podokesaurus holyokensis. The generic name is derived from the Ancient Greek words podōkēs (ποδώκης), which means "swift (or fleet)-footed", an epithet commonly used in reference to the Greek hero Achilles, and saura (σαύρα) meaning "lizard", while the specific name refers to Holyoke. In full, the name can be translated as "swift-footed lizard of Holyoke". The discovery and naming of Podokesaurus made Talbot the first woman to find and describe a non-bird dinosaur. The American paleontologist Robert T. Bakker stated in 2014 that while old professors grumbled that women were unfit for working with fossils during his time at university, Talbot's discovery of Podokesaurus was a counterargument to that.

By the time the description was published, Talbot had sent the fossil to the Peabody Museum of Natural History at Yale University for further preparation and study, where cast replicas were also made of the bones as they lay in the rock. There, Lull drew a reconstruction of the skeleton, basing the parts missing from the fossil on the equivalents in Compsognathus, and created a model of the animal in life, which Talbot later described as having a "sardonic smile". Lull expanded on Talbot's article in a 1915 publication, wherein he also proposed other identities for some of the bones than what she had originally suggested, including a partial coracoid instead of a scapula and part of the tibia instead of the ilium (part of the hips). Lull suggested that the boulder containing the fossil must have come from a ledge which lay on the south side of the Holyoke Range, about two or three miles north of where it was found, and specified that it was from the Longmeadow Sandstone.

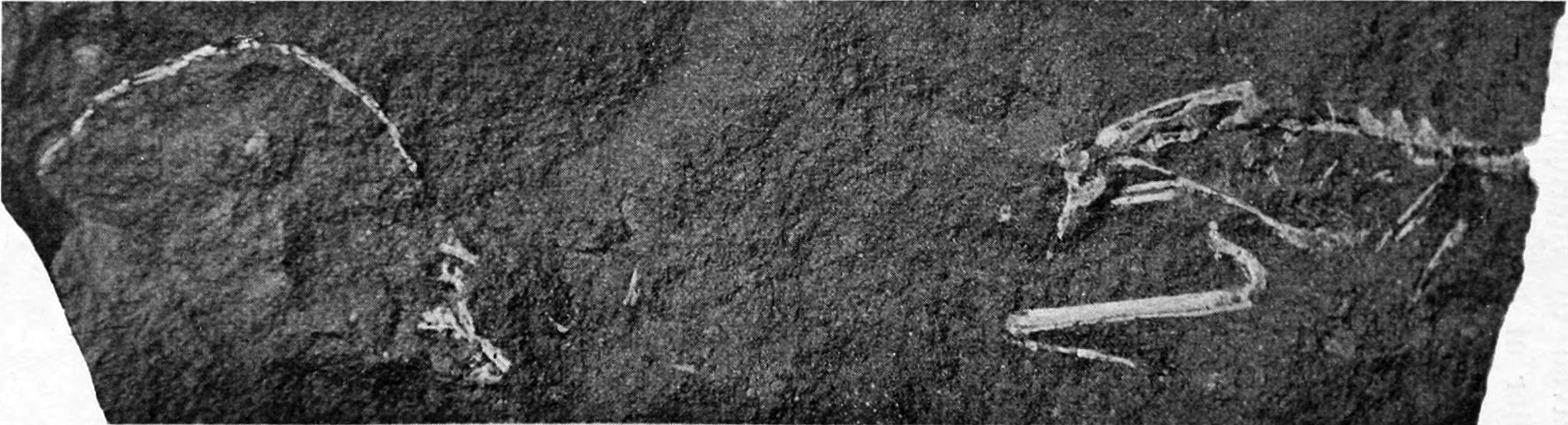
Ca 1913 photo of the holotype

Lull had sent his manuscript to the Danish ornithologist Gerhard Heilmann for criticism prior to publication. Heilmann published his response in a 1913 article in which he included previously unpublished photos of the fossil received from Talbot, as well as his own restorations. He disagreed with some of Lull's anatomical interpretations, and had corresponded regarding the fossil with the American zoologist Robert Wilson Shufeldt about his contentions. Heilmann's article was one in a series about the origin of birds, wherein he examined the skeletons of prehistoric reptiles to find traits that may have been ancestral to birds. In a 1916 Washington Academy of Sciences meeting, Shufeldt gave an account of his correspondence with Lull, Talbot, and Heilmann, and agreed with the latter in some of his criticisms of Lull's restoration of Podokesaurus.

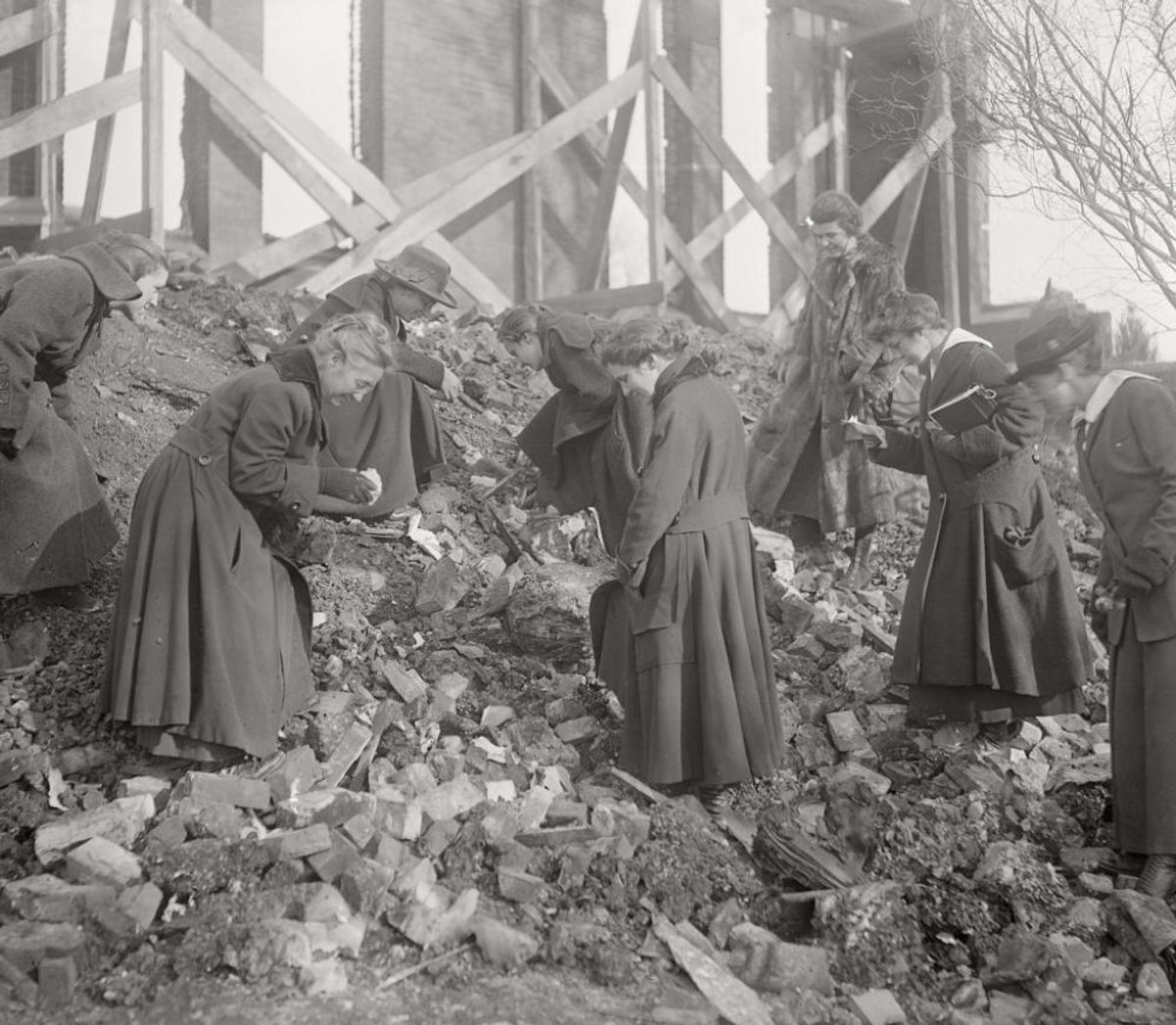
Mignon Talbot (second from left) and students searching the rubble of the burned down Williston Hall in 1917

Talbot wanted the fossil to stay at Yale or Washington on permanent exhibit, where it could "be with its kind", but it was kept at Mount Holyoke in the old science building, Williston Hall, as a local specimen, where it became a "pet curiosity" for the students. During the Christmas break of 1917, Williston Hall burned down, and no remains of the Podokesaurus fossil were found in the rubble. The American writer Christopher Benfey pointed out in 2002 that Podokesaurus therefore had the peculiar distinction of being the dinosaur that vanished twice. The German paleontologist Friedrich von Huene was the last to study and describe the holotype specimen, in a 1914 publication before it was destroyed (he had studied it at Yale before Talbot's description was published). While the college's fossil collections were almost entirely destroyed by the fire, its facilities and collections continued to grow and improve afterwards due to Talbot's efforts.

No other unequivocal Podokesaurus specimens have since been found, but cast replicas of the type specimen remain at the Peabody Museum of Natural History and the American Museum of Natural History in New York. Podokesaurus received little further attention until new and abundant fossils of Coelophysis were discovered in the late 1940s, and the anatomy of small theropod dinosaurs became clearer; the American paleontologists Edwin Harris Colbert and Donald Baird compared Podokesaurus with Coelophysis in 1958, using the casts of the former. Along with the sauropodomorph Anchisaurus, Podokesaurus was among the first substantial collections of dinosaur skeletal material known from the East Coast of North America. Apart from a tooth (assigned to Coelophysis in 1976), all other Early Jurassic theropod records on the East Coast are footprints.

In 2021, Podokesaurus and Anchisaurus were proposed as contenders for state dinosaur of Massachusetts by Representative Jack Patrick Lewis, with Podokesaurus winning the online poll. On May 2, 2022, Governor Charlie Baker signed a law making it the official state dinosaur. A 2024 paper about identification of natural dinosaur bone casts concluded that new methods could be used to find additional remains of Podokesaurus, noting its status as state dinosaur.

== Description ==
Size of Podokesaurus compared to a human and a cat

The preserved body of the only known Podokesaurus fossil was 18 cm (7 in) long. Lull estimated the complete length of Podokesaurus to have been 1,150 mm (3.77 ft), the neck accounting for 130 mm (5.1 in), the back for 170 mm (6.7 in), the sacrum (the vertebrae of the pelvic region) for 45 mm (1.8 in), and the tail for 730 mm (2.40 ft). Von Huene estimated the animal to have been 1,100 mm (3.6 ft) long, with the tail accounting for about 70 cm (2.3 ft), more than 1.5 times the rest of the skeleton together. Colbert estimated the animal's length at about 1 m (3.3 ft). In 1995, the writer Jan Peczkis estimated Podokesaurus to have weighed 10–40 kg (22–88 lb), through pelvic height determination (based on von Huene's measurements). The paleontologist Gregory S. Paul estimated it to have weighed 1 kg (2 lb) in 2016 (based on a 1 m length estimate). Talbot stated in 1937 that those scientists who had seen the specimen did not think it was a young individual as there were no indications of cartilage that would turn to bone with age, while Paul thought it was possibly juvenile. In general, the animal was lightly constructed, with hollow bones. As a coelophysoid, it would likely have been similar in build to for example Coelophysis, being slender, long-necked, and with sharp, recurved teeth.

Since few other small theropods were known at the time Podokesaurus was described, it was mainly compared to the later genera Compsognathus, Ornitholestes, and Ornithomimus, which were thought related. Due to the fragmentary nature of the Podokesaurus specimen and the fact that it is lost, the identity and shape of some of its bones are today unclear. As only casts of the specimen now remain, it is only possible to get a general impression of the preserved skeleton and its proportions. Talbot identified bone fragments next to the tail as skull bones because two of them were bilaterally symmetric, and one was broadly convex with a sulcus (or furrow) at the midline, and according to Lull, was possibly placed at the upper wall of the skull, not far from the frontal bones. Lull thought other of these elements may have been part of the nasal bones. Von Huene instead interpreted these bones as caudals from the middle of the tail.

=== Postcranial skeleton ===
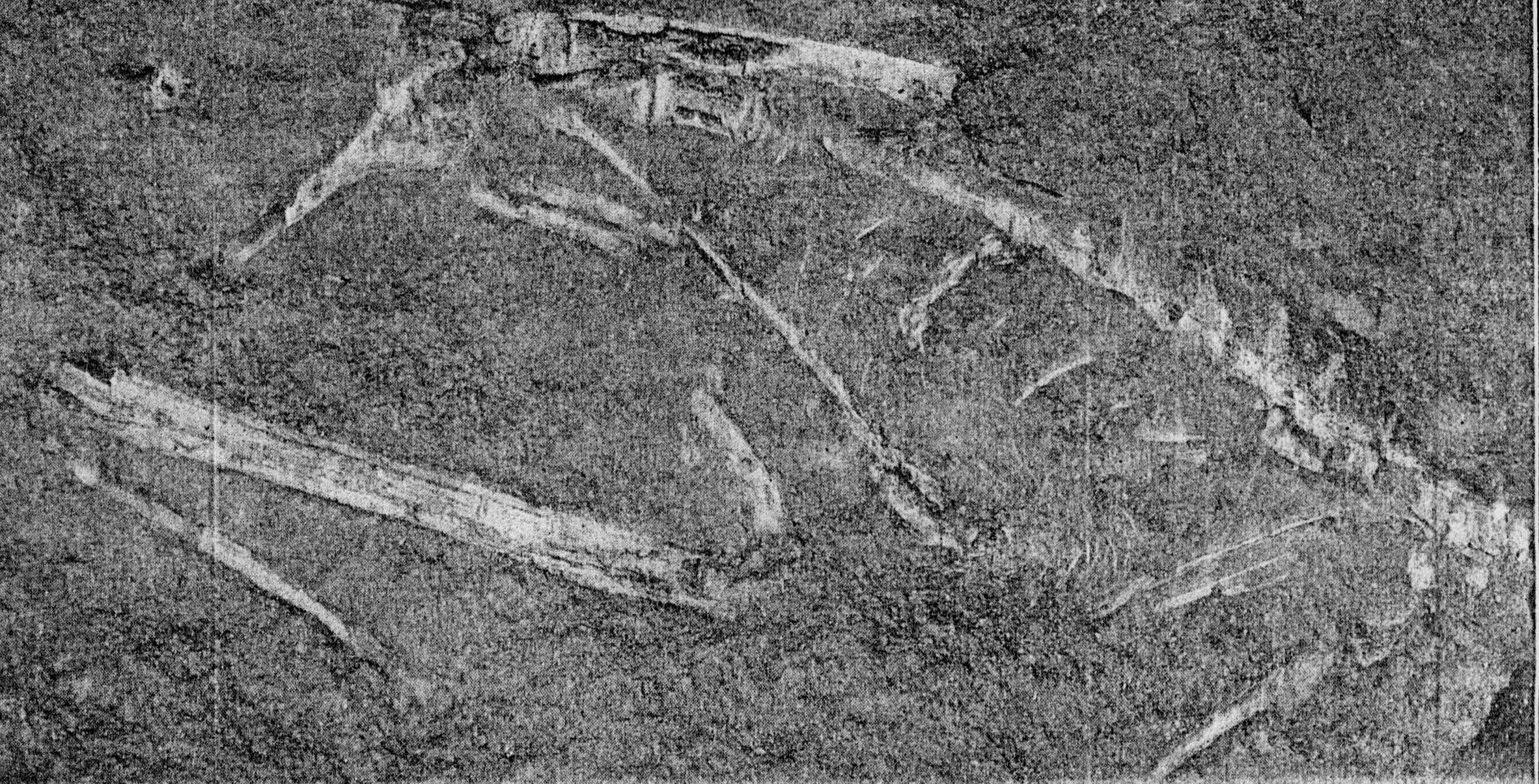
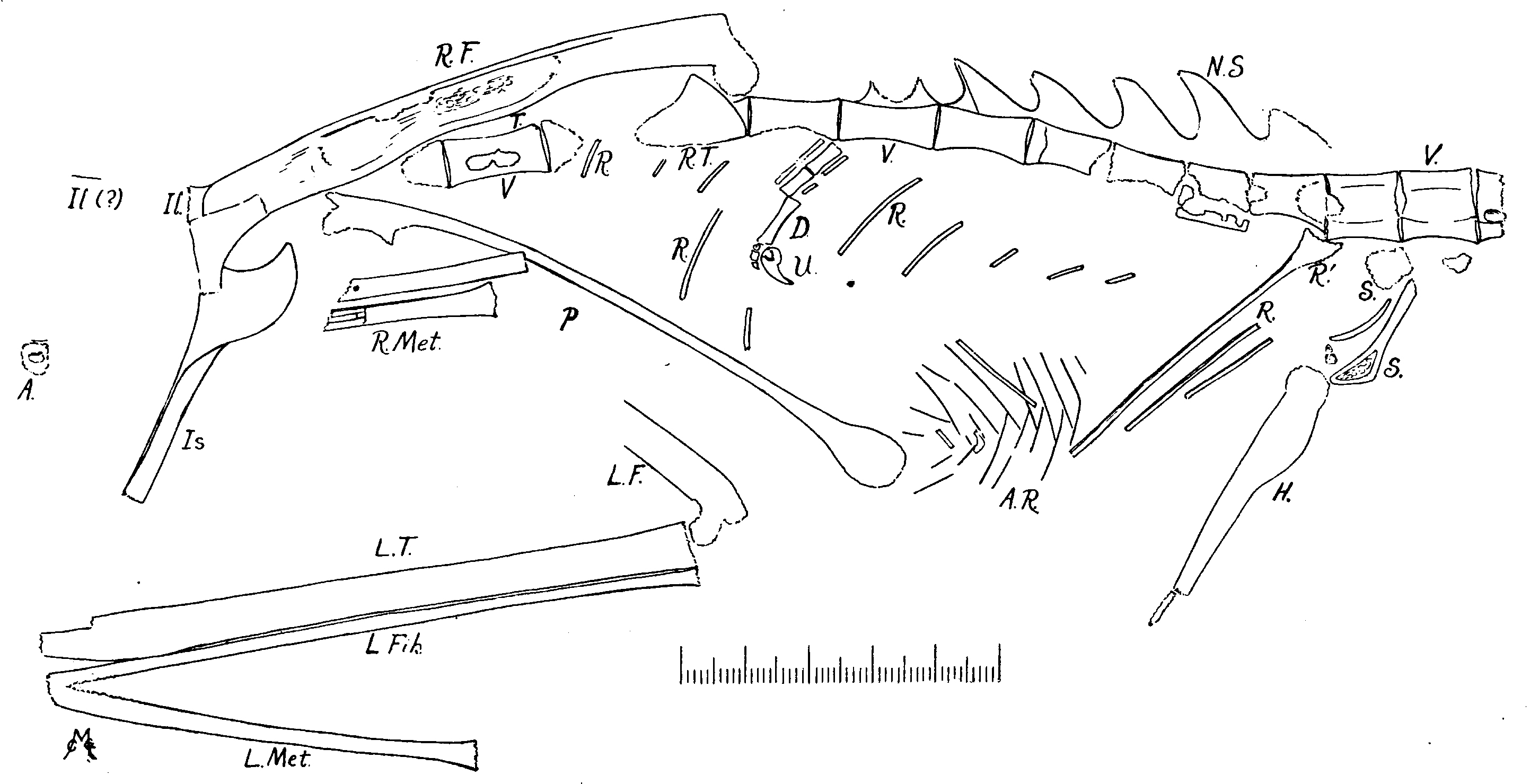
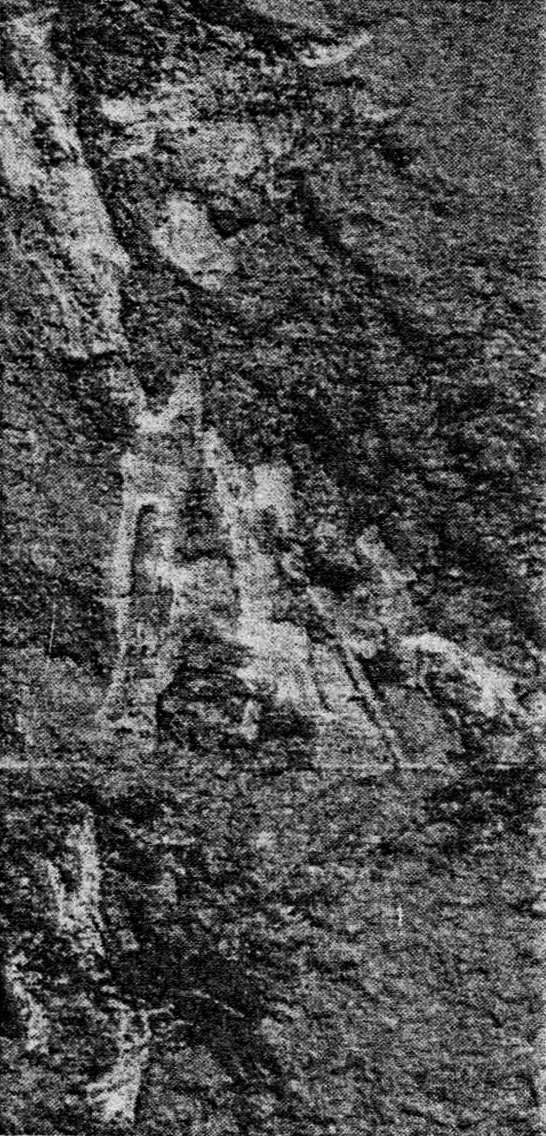
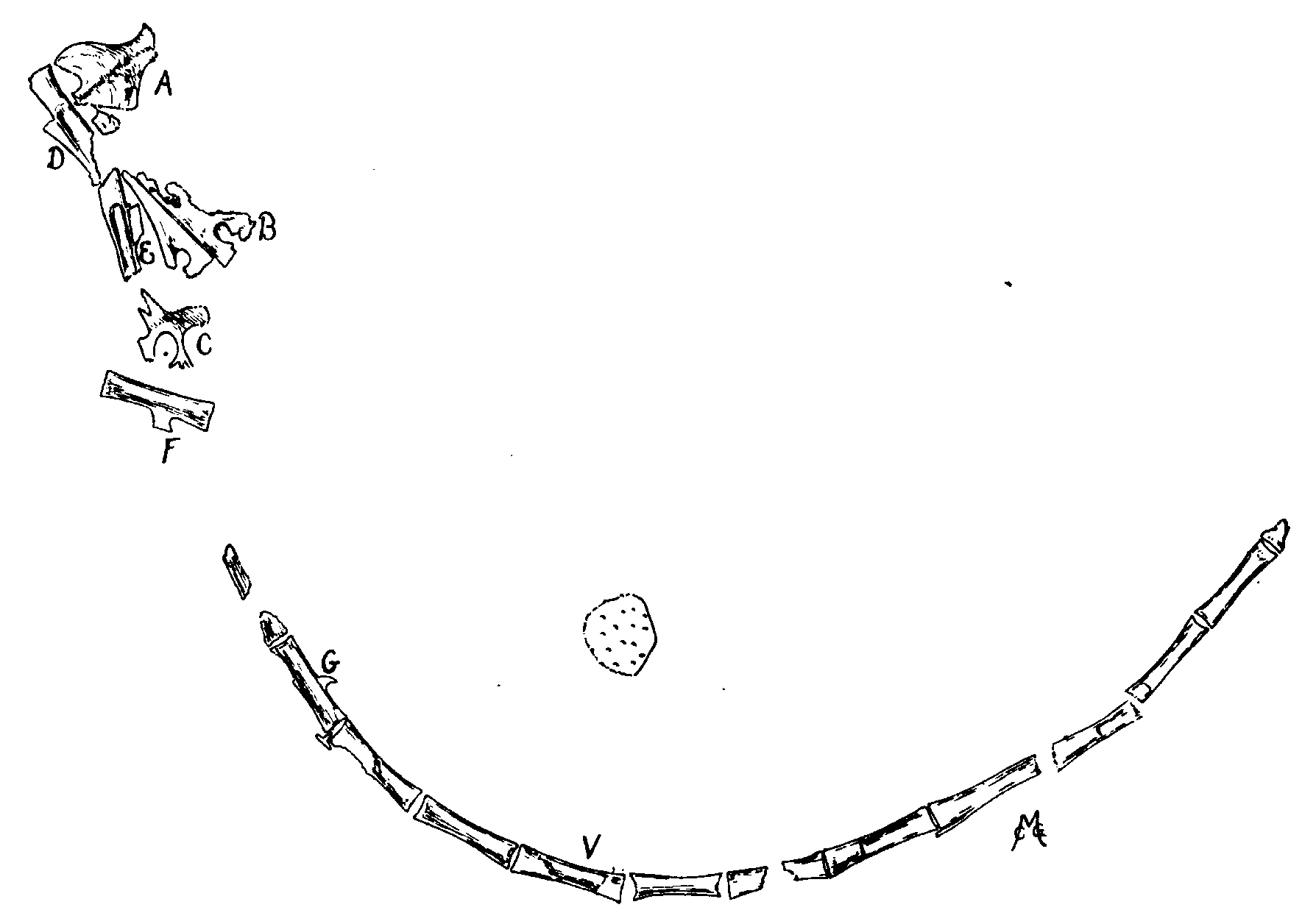
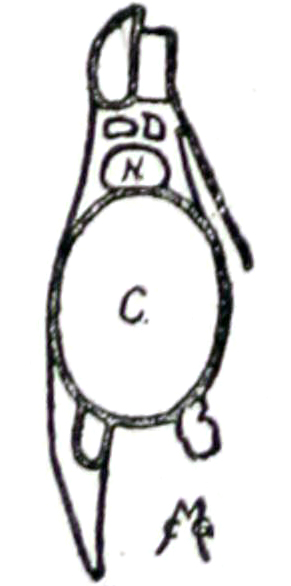
Photo and interpretative drawing of the front part of the specimen from 1911 (above), photo of uncertain bone fragments that may belong to either the skull or tail (bottom left), drawing of the tail and uncertain bone fragments (lower middle), and cross-section of a vertebra (lower right)

The vertebrae were very light and hollow, and some were slightly concave at each end. The cervical vertebrae were relatively large in length and diameter compared to the dorsals, and had styliform (resembling a pen or bristle in shape) cervical ribs which were long, straight, and narrow, as in Anchisaurus. The front dorsals were much shorter than the cervicals, then again increased in size towards the pelvis. They measured 12–13 mm (0.47–0.51 in) in length. The neural spines of the dorsals were narrow, high, and curved backwards, but not as expanded from front to back as in Compsognathus. The dorsal ribs were strongly curved and very slender and hollow, reminiscent of those in Saltopus and Hallopus, the largest being 52 mm (2.0 in) long and 2 mm (0.1 in) wide. The transverse processes (that connected with the ribs on each side of a vertebra) formed a circular arc downward from each side of a dorsal, extending about as far from the centrum (the "body" of a vertebra) as the spinous process was high. The zygapophyses (processes that connected adjacent vertebrae) were well-developed. The centra were relatively longer than those of Ornithomimus, while those of Compsognathus resembled those of Podokesaurus more, but were shorter.

While the hind part of the tail was located some distance away from the rest of the skeleton, Lull believed it was in its natural position and that it would have been very long, the intermediate vertebrae having been swept away. The caudal vertebrae were very long and slender, and along with their chevrons (bones on the undersides of the caudals), resembled those of Ornitholestes. A typical caudal was 17 mm (0.67 in) long and 4 mm (0.16 in) in diameter. The caudals were very similar in length and did not decrease in length until the last few in the succession. Just in front of the pubis there was a cluster of slender gastralia (abdominal ribs), the longest of which was 18 mm (0.71 in) long. The frontmost gastralia had broadened ends, which is often the condition in sternal ribs.

The humerus was small and very delicate, 42 mm (1.7 in) long, less than half the length of the femur. It had a strong processus lateralis (a process directed to the side) 30 mm (1.2 in) above its lower end. Lull found it similar to that of Ornitholestes, apart from the radial crest (that connected with the radius bone of the lower arm) not being as high, showing little muscular power. Von Huene estimated the radius to have been 30 mm (1.2 in) long. Lull found the hand more similar to that of Compsognathus than of Ornitholestes. Only slender phalanx bones of the three fingers were preserved, including sharp, curved claws.

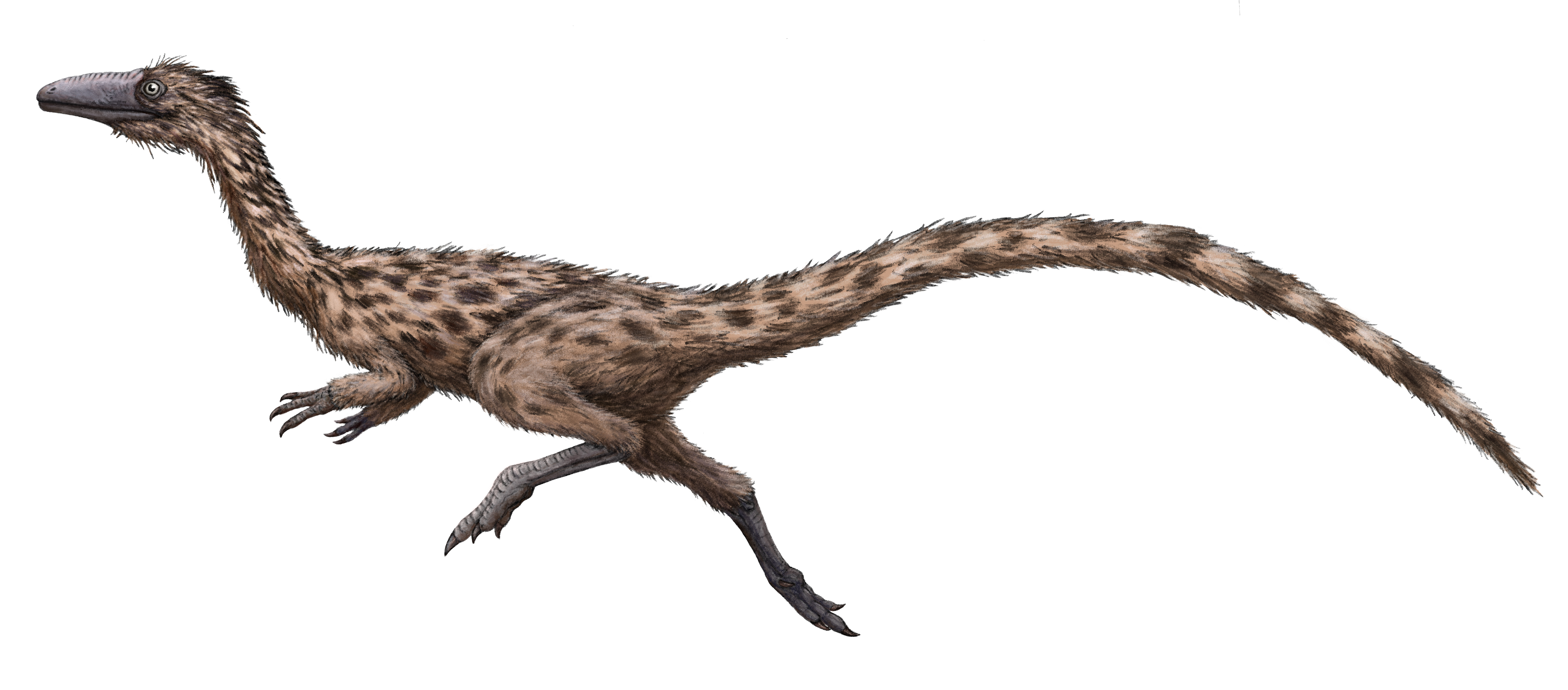
Hypothetical life restoration

The pubis was very long, expanding both at the front and hind ends. It was 6 mm (0.24 in) wide and 95 mm (3.7 in) long, and its lower expansion was 10 mm (0.39 in) in diameter. Talbot found the pubis similar to that of the then undescribed Procompsognathus. Lull argued that the pubis lay approximately in position in the fossil, pointing forwards. Heilmann instead believed the bone had been moved out of position before burial, and would have been directed backwards. Colbert and Baird suggested the pubis was directed forwards, but that it curved slightly upwards instead of downwards due to natural warping and cracking of the bone. The ischium was 55 mm (2.2 in) long, 15.5 mm (0.61 in) wide at the end closest to the body, and its slender shaft was 4 mm (0.16 in) in diameter, and somewhat thickened at its lower end. Lull found it similar to those of Compsognathus and Ornitholestes. Below the acetabulum (where the femur connects with the pelvis) there was a broad lamella running towards the pubis.

The femur was slender, nearly straight, had thin walls, and was expanded at the back side of its lower end. It was 86 mm (3.4 in) long and 6.5 mm (0.26 in) in diameter just below the fourth trochanter (a flange placed mid-length at the back of the femur). The fourth trochanter was strong, 18 mm (0.71 in) long and about 2 mm (0.079 in) high, and was situated past the middle of the shaft, towards the lower end. The condyles (round prominences) of the femur's lower end protruded strongly hindwards. The tibia was a thin, narrow shaft, 104 mm (4.1 in) in length, and about 7 mm (0.28 in) in diameter. Talbot stated the very thin fibula lay close to the tibia and was of almost equal length, while von Huene thought this was instead part of the crushed tibia. The three metatarsals of the lower leg were closely appressed together forming a compact structure, similar to what was seen in Ornithomimus, but not fused into a tarsometatarsus, as seen in birds. The length of the metatarsals was 75 mm (3.0 in), while their width was 9 mm (0.35 in). The most complete pedal phalanx was very slender and 12 mm (0.47 in) long.

== Classification ==
=== Early interpretations ===
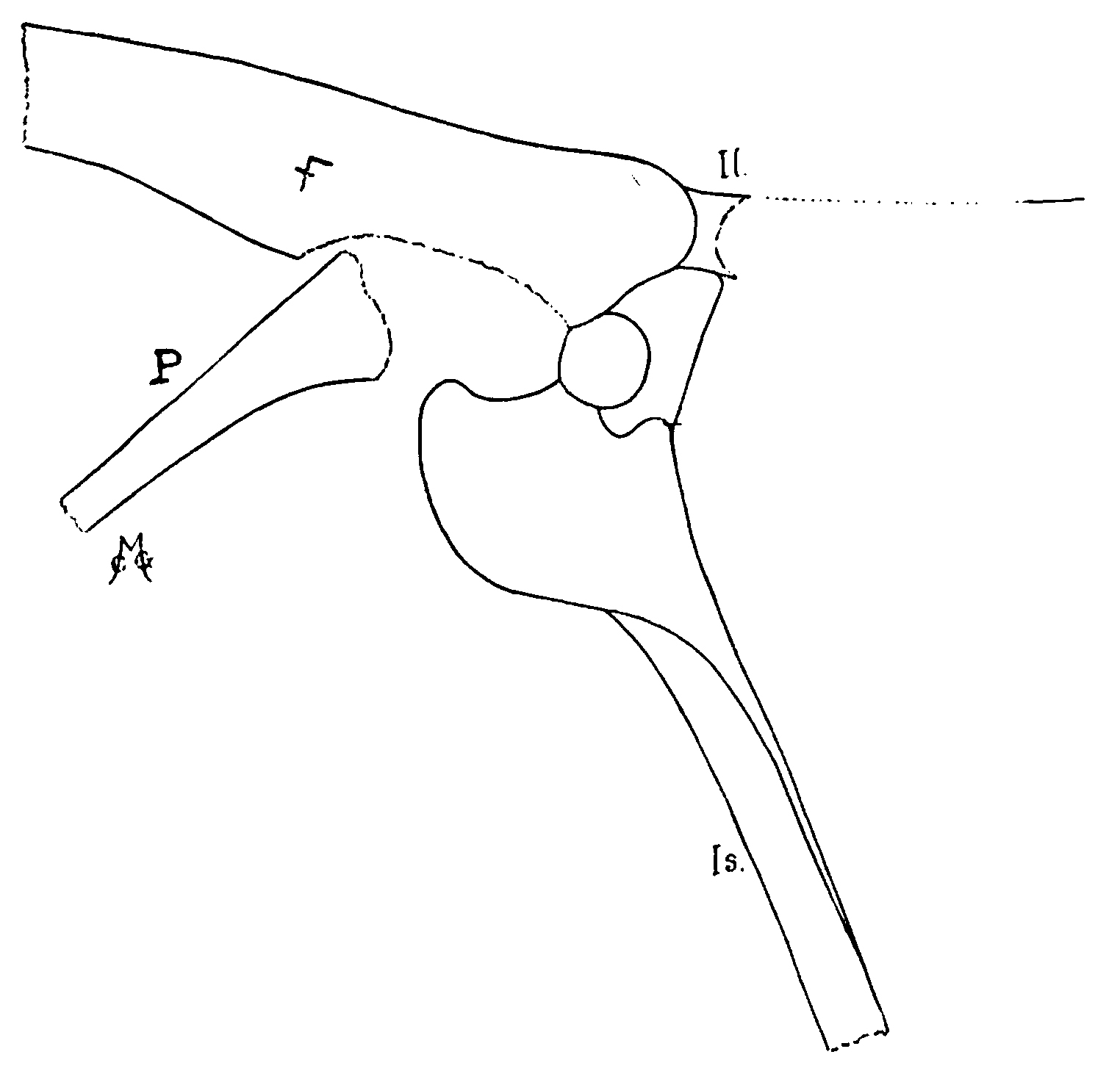
Pelvic bones as figured by Talbot in 1911

When reading her preliminary description in 1910, Talbot suggested Podokesaurus to have been an "herbivorous dinosaur", but further work at Yale University showed that some bones had been incorrectly identified, and the ischium of the pelvis with a well-developed ridge was found to resemble that of Compsognathus. She refrained from making a definite classification of the specimen in her 1911 description due to the lack of jaw and foot-bones which could have aided in this, but concluded it would have belonged to a "carnivorous dinosaur" based on the shape and position of the pubis, as well as the absence of a postpubis. She considered the fossil to be Triassic in age (the first of the three Mesozoic periods). In 1914, von Huene named the new family Podokesauridae, wherein he, in addition to Podokesaurus, included Saltopus, Procompsognathus, Coelophysis, and Tanystropheus. He placed this group under Coelurosauria, which at the time was used to include small theropods in general.

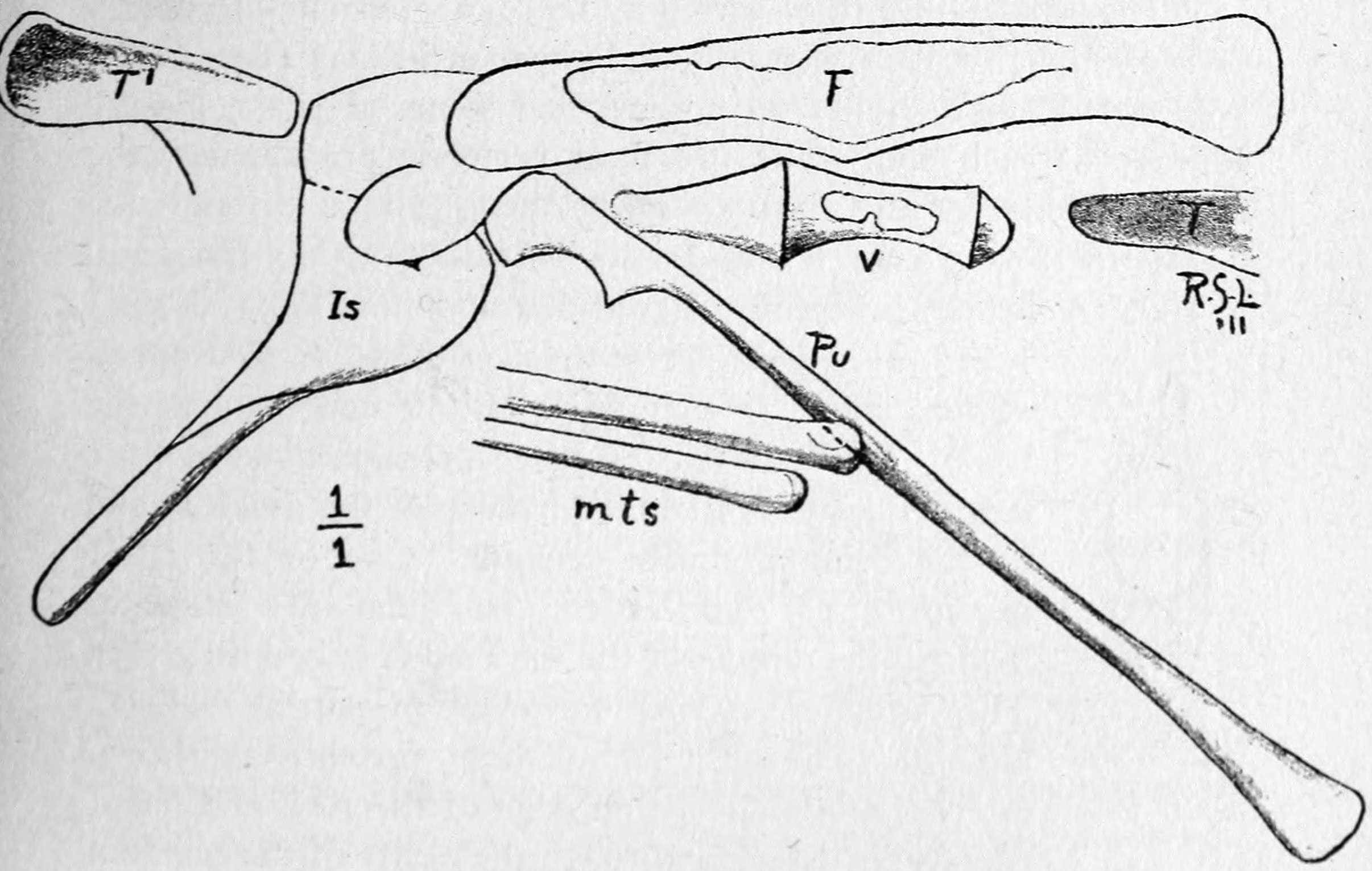
Lull's 1915 illustration of the pelvic region, showing the forwards directed pubis (Pu) as preserved

Heilmann considered Podokesaurus very similar to the early bird Archaeopteryx in 1913, and wondered why Talbot had not made any comparisons to it. He particularly found the legs and the pelvis, when the pubis was interpreted as pointing backwards (as in birds), similar to what it might look like in a bird ancestor, while considering Lull's reconstruction of a forward-directed pubis unlikely. He also found parts of the shoulder blade, forelimbs, and even tail bones similar to those of birds. He furthermore pointed to the presence of abdominal ribs and that the bones were hollow, and concluded that nothing precluded Podokesaurus from being a very primitive proto-bird, with not yet fused middle-foot bones. The only feature he found inconsistent with this interpretation was the short finger with a claw, if it was not instead part of a toe. He suggested that the issue could be determined if the skull, sternum, and clavicle were found in the rock, bones that would be important clues for classification.

Heilmann wished for a clearer explanation of the placement of the middle-foot bones in relation to each other, and found it surprising that Lull's reconstruction of Podokesaurus showed an even more appressed middle-foot than was present in the later supposed descendant Ornithomimus, which he thought would have developed a completely bird-like middle-foot by that time. Heilmann found Podokesaurus very unusual for a dinosaur from the Triassic, and thought it was one of the earliest bipedal vertebrates. He suggested that since it was so different from Thecodontosaurus and Plateosaurus, those may not have been dinosaurs, or Podokesaurus could instead have been related to Saltopus or parasuchians, but found its fossils too insufficient to say anything definite about the issue.

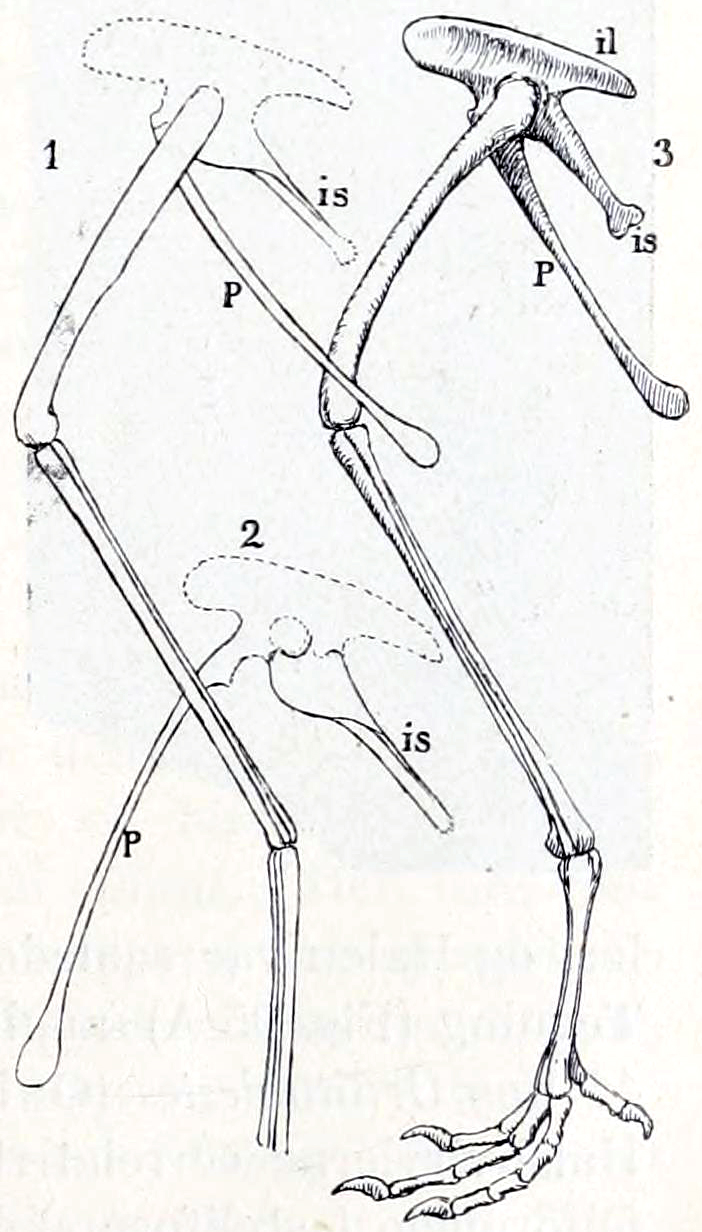
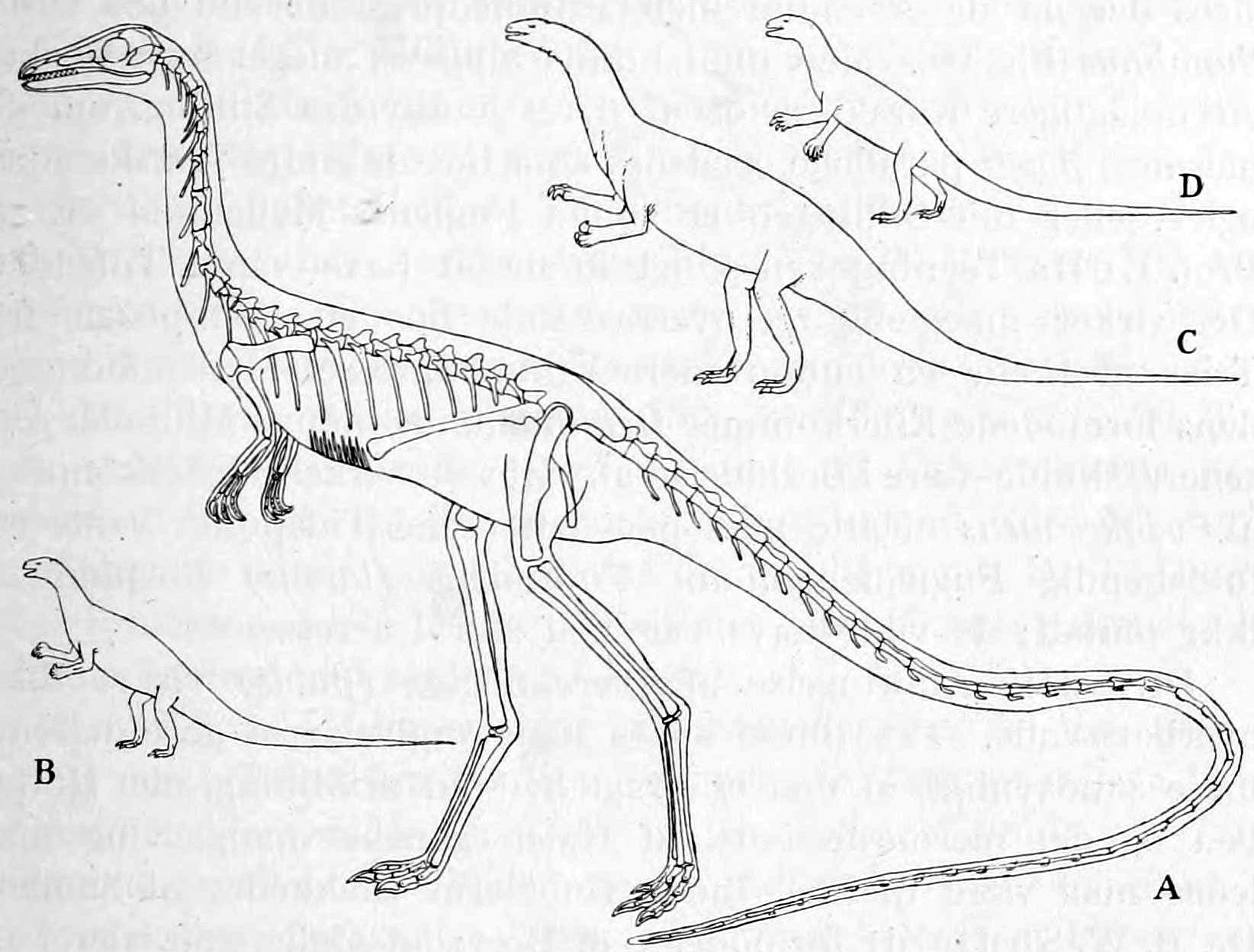
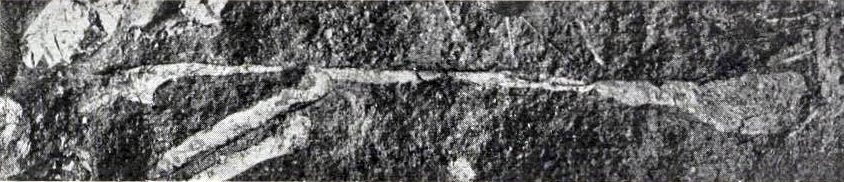
Gerhard Heilmann's 1913 comparison between the legs and pelvis of Podokesaurus (upper left: 1, with backwards directed pubis, 2, with forwards directed pubis) and Archaeopteryx (3), his redrawing of Lull's skeletal reconstruction (upper right) compared with other dinosaurs, and photo of the pubis (below)

Shufeldt elaborated on his and Heilmann's interpretation of the pubis in 1915, and stated the bone had probably been displaced during fossilization. He pointed out that if it had faced forward, it would have been in forcible contact with the abdominal ribs that would have been dangerous for internal organs during movement. Lull found Heilmann and Shufeldt's criticisms of his pelvis reconstruction probable in 1915. He listed Podokesauridae under the superfamily Compsognatha, and suggested Podokesaurus was perhaps ancestral to the later North American genera Ornitholestes and Ornithimimus. In 1916, Heilmann pointed out that early dinosaurs, parasuchians, and pterosaurs all had similarities to birds, as well as to each other, and that Triassic reptiles like Scleromochlus, Saltopus, and Podokesaurus, were difficult to separate. He proposed that Podokesaurus and other bipedal reptiles from the Triassic were descended from pseudosuchians (which many types of archosaurs were classified as at the time) that may have evolved bipedality by the Permian. He concluded that birds were descended from ornithosuchian pseudosuchians rather than from dinosaurs, due to their bipedality and bird-like legs.

The paleontologist Henry Fairfield Osborn used Podokesaurus as an example of a "carnivorous dinosaur of the bird-like type" in 1917, while stating that similarities between birds and dinosaurs were due to parallel evolution. The paleontologist Franz Nopcsa von Felső-Szilvás created the subfamily Podokesaurinae in 1928, within which he included Podokesaurus, Procerosaurus, Saltopus, and Tanystropheus. Von Huene grouped Podokesaurus, Coelophysis, Spinosuchus, Halticosaurus, Saltopus, Avipes, and Velocipes in Podokesauridae in 1932.

=== Relation to Coelophysis ===
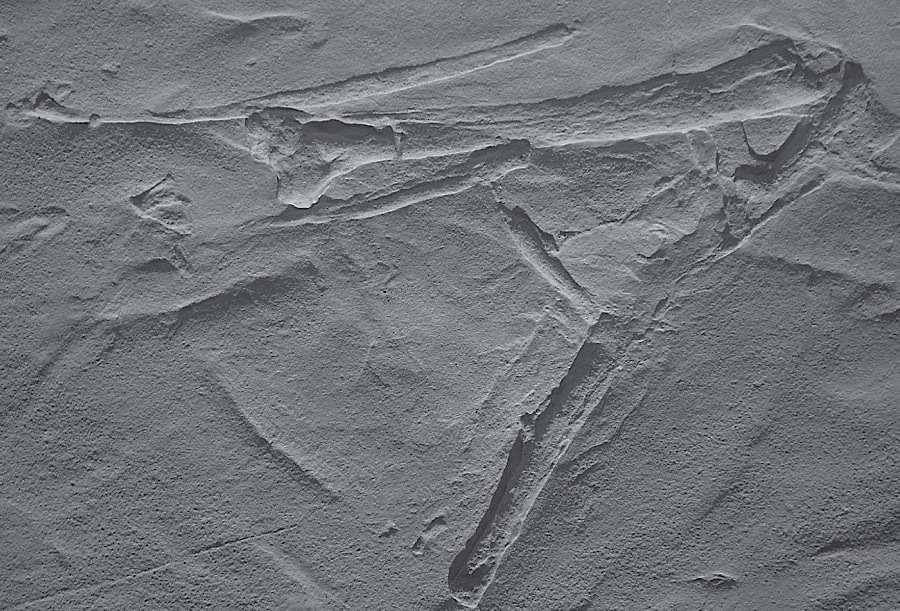
Replica of a natural cast of bones assigned to C. holyokensis in 1964 (when Podokesaurus was suggested to be a synonym of Coelophysis)

In 1958, Colbert and Baird described a theropod specimen consisting of natural casts of bones in sandstone (probably formed when the bones were dissolved by acidic water, leaving molds of the bones), including a pubis, tibia, and some ribs. They found the specimen similar to Coelophysis and Podokesaurus, referring to it as C. sp. (of unknown species). They considered the natural cast and Podokesaurus to be from the Portland Arkose of the Newark Group in the Connecticut valley. Though Podokesaurus was smaller than the others (being comparable in size to the smallest-known Coelophysis specimens), these researchers suggested that because it was so similar to them, this raised questions as to its validity. In 1964, Colbert synonymized Podokesaurus with Coelophysis, (since the latter name was older), coining the new combination C. holyokensis. He also suggested that the natural cast belonged to C. holyokensis. Colbert stated that Podokesaurus could only be distinguished from Coelophysis by the neural spines of its vertebrae not being as long from front to back, and because the ischium differed in shape. He found these differences to be similar to those seen between modern reptile species within the same genus, and that they represented eastern (C. holyokensis) and western (C. bauri) species of the same genus. While he admitted that these conclusions were not ironclad, and that Podokesaurus may indeed have been distinct, he said the burden of proof should be on the proponents of such a view.

In 1977, the paleontologists Paul E. Olsen and Peter Galton redated the Newark Supergroup (which the Portland Formation belongs to) to the Early Jurassic instead of the preceding Triassic as was previously thought. This was part of a study in which Olsen compared the fauna of various formations and concluded there had not been a sudden, widespread extinction event at the Triassic-Jurassic border, but that it had instead been gradual. Olsen stated in 1980 that while the exact provenance and systematic position of Podokesaurus will probably remain uncertain, the Portland Formation it was thought to be from was probably Early Jurassic in age, and therefore 15 million years younger than Coelophysis from the Triassic. Since features shared between Podokesaurus and Coelophysis are also known in other small theropods, such as Syntarsus, Olsen suggested that Podokesaurus should be retained as a separate genus of indeterminate theropods, to avoid overextending the temporal range of Coelophysis. He also applied this argument to the natural cast, regarding it as incertae sedis (with uncertain relationships) among theropods rather than as Podokesaurus or Coelophysis.

The paleontologist Samuel P. Welles stated in 1984 that the family Podokesauridae had become a "catch-all" for most Triassic theropods. While he found Coelophysis the most similar to Podokesaurus among theropods, he thought the two differed greatly in that the fourth trochanter of the latter was below midheight on the femur (unlike the higher position in most other theropods), and its metatarsals were of equal length. The paleontologist Kevin Padian stated in 1986 that while Colbert's suggestion of synonymy was possible, the discernible similarities between Podokesaurus and Coelophysis were primitive theropod features, and the two were not as close in time as once thought. Paul said in 1988 that while the family Podokesauridae was still used for Coelophysis and kin, Podokesaurus was not based on good remains to begin with, and with only bad cast replicas remaining, he thought there would always be disagreement about the taxon. He found this to be too much ambiguity to put up with, and proposed the name Coelophysidae should be used instead (Halticosauridae, another contender, was also based on too fragmentary remains). In 1989, Colbert also doubted the synonymy of Podokesaurus with Coelophysis, and that the natural casts belonged to the latter, due to their revised Early Jurassic ages, and he made no attempt to resolve the status of Podokesaurus due to the only specimen being lost. He retained the name Podokesauridae for the family.

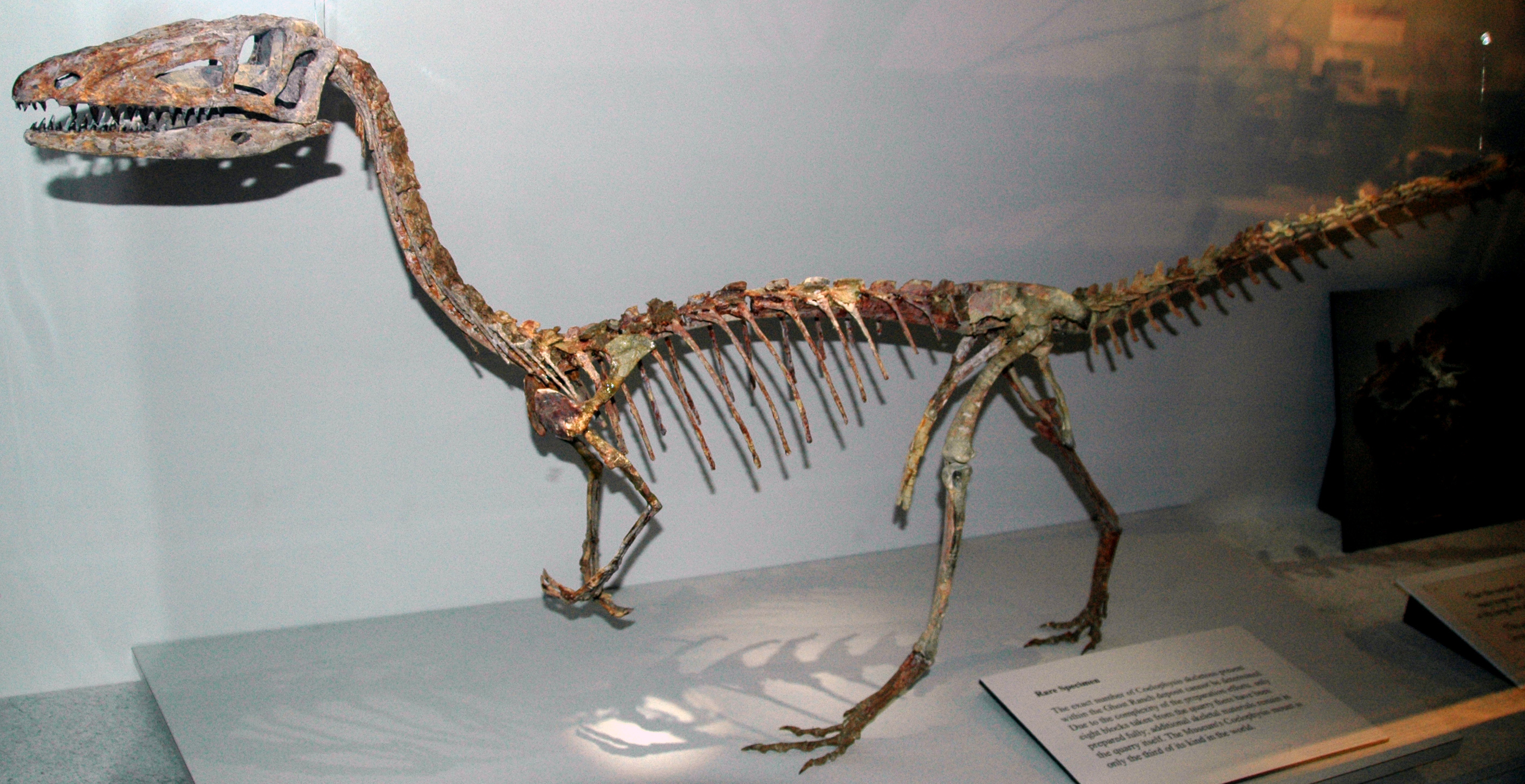
Mounted skeleton of Coelophysis, which is thought to have been similar to Podokesaurus

In 1990, the paleontologists Timothy Rowe and Jacques Gauthier considered Podokesauridae a taxonomic waste-basket, wherein taxa had been grouped based on phenetic resemblance and stratigraphic division, and therefore under continuous revision and instability. They considered it possible that Podokesaurus and the natural cast specimen were Coelophysis, but found that their similarities were not shared exclusively by them, but were ancestral features among theropods. They therefore agreed that the name Podokesaurus should be restricted to the holotype, and that it and the natural cast should be considered Theropoda incertae sedis. In the same volume, the paleontologist David B. Norman agreed with this assessment, and stated the features used to unite Podokesaurus with Coelophysis merely confirm that they were dinosaurs rather than establish a specific relation between them. The paleontologist Thomas R. Holtz agreed in 1994 that the family name Podokesauridae should be replaced by Coelophysidae. By this time, the idea that small theropods should be grouped in Coelurosauria and large theropods in Carnosauria was falling out of favor, and Coelophysoidea was considered a separate group of gracile, early theropods. The paleontologists David B. Weishampel and Luther Young suggested ceratosaurian affinities for Podokesaurus in 1996.

The paleontologist Ronald S. Tykoski and Rowe noted in 2004 that while Podokesaurus had coelophysoid features (such as a small, knob-like expansion on the lower part of the pubis), it did not have any derived traits that would unite it with Coelophysis. They agreed with earlier researchers that the name Podokesaurus should be restricted to the holotype, and concluded that the natural cast may be a coelophysoid, but could not be identified beyond being a theropod. In 2004, the paleontologists Matthew T. Carrano and Scott D. Sampson stated that Podokesaurus was almost certainly a coelophysoid similar to Coelophysis. It had coelophysoid features such as a long, downward curved pubis, that was longer than the ischium, and an additional foramen (opening) on the pubis, below the oburator foramen, but little more could be said about its affinities. Carrano and colleagues stated in 2004 that Segisaurus and Podokesaurus were among the latest-surviving coelophysoids, and that the evolutionary radiation of this group may have ended by the latest part of the Early Jurassic. Also in 2004, the paleontologists Anthea Bristowe and Michael A. Raath listed Podokesaurus as a synonym of Coelophysis without elaboration. Tykoski rejected synonymy between the two in his 2005 dissertation, but left Podokesaurus out of his analysis. Paul suggested in 2016 that Podokesaurus may have formed the family Coelophysidae with Coelophysis, Panguraptor, and Procompsognathus.

== Paleobiology ==
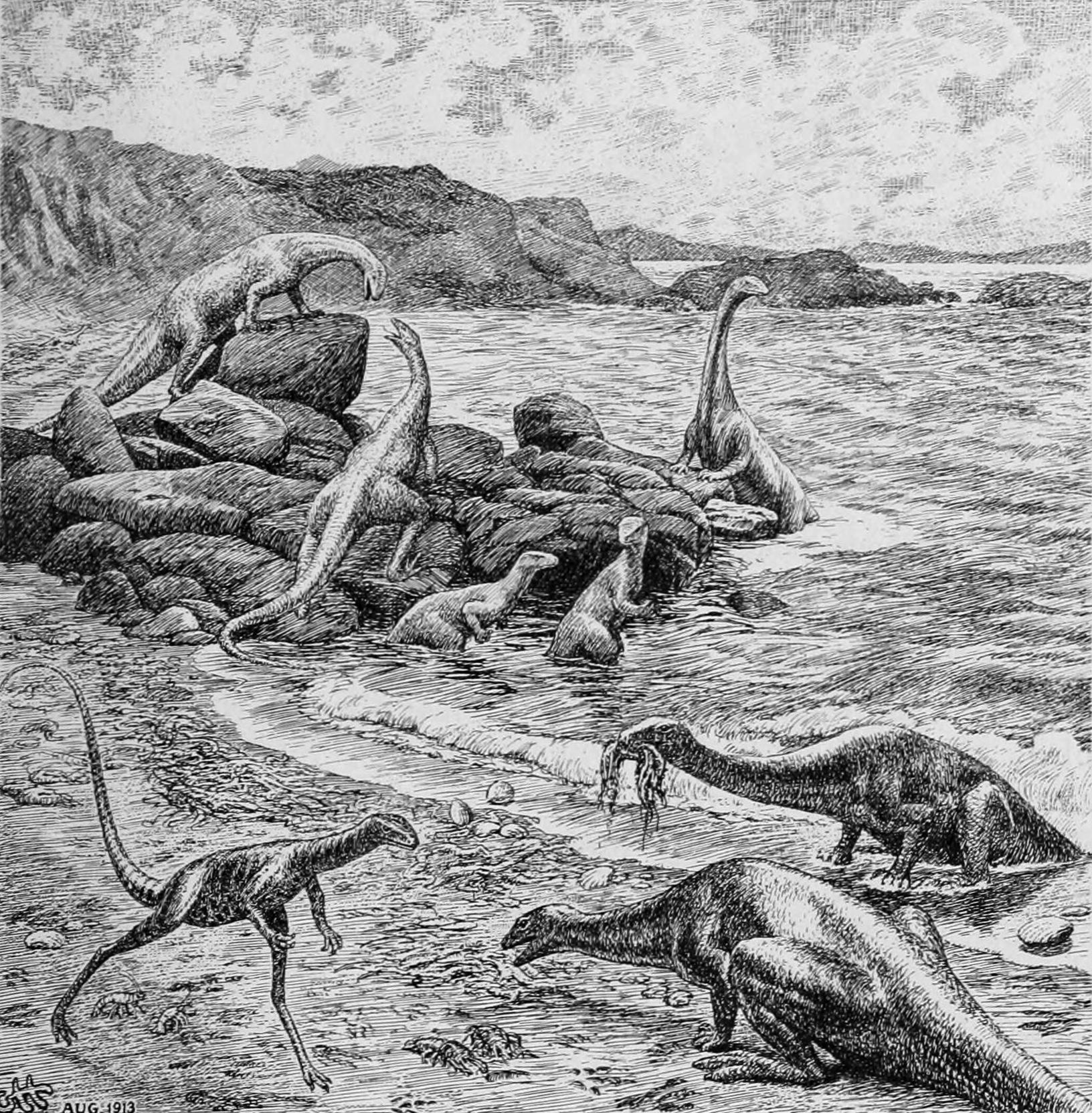
Heilmann's outdated 1913 restoration of Podokesaurus running near a lake and other dinosaurs

Talbot suggested that the short, slender humerus, long, straight hindlimb bones, and the well-developed fourth trochanter of the femur indicated that Podokesaurus was bipedal. She found the fact that the tibia was much longer than the femur, that the metatarsals were very long, over half the length of the tibia, and the skeleton's light construction, were indicative of rapid locomotion. Talbot stated that Lull thought this was an adaptation to climatic conditions, as the animal must have been able to travel fast and far for water in its semi-arid region. Talbot also reported a small piece of smooth, polished quartz among the ribs, and suggested it could have been a gastrolith (stomach stone), and so the first time these were found in association with a carnivorous dinosaur. Von Huene agreed the stone was a gastrolith, distinct from the surrounding sandstone, and added it was 11 mm (0.43 in) long.

Lull found the animal to have been essentially a slender, cursorial (adapted for running) animal, with carnivorous habits, but that the slenderness that made it swift also confined it to small prey. In 1932, von Huene proposed that small coelurosaurs had a jumping gait, due to their lower legs being longer than their upper legs, contrasting with the alternating steps of carnosaurs. With its large fourth trocanther, he thought Podokesaurus had probably abandoned this jumping gait, instead moving with rapid, alternating steps similar to ratite birds.

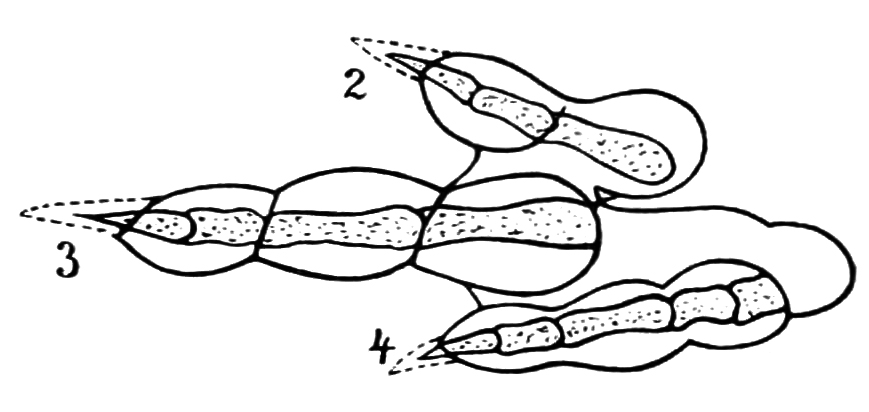
Grallator cursorius footprint, which Lull correlated with Podokesaurus

In 1982, the paleontologist Richard A. Thulborn estimated the speed of various dinosaurs, based on the relationships between speed, gait, and body size of modern animals (mainly mammals). By extrapolating the stride length and cadence of Podokesaurus, he estimated it could have run at about 15–20 km/h (9–12 mph). He concluded that if a dinosaur could match a mammal in speed, it must have had similar levels of efficiency in locomotor ability and physiology. He cautioned that comparison was difficult because dinosaur anatomy differed significantly from that of mammals and birds. Differences included the massive tails of dinosaurs, and hindlimb retractor muscles that originated behind the femur, while these muscles originate more forward in mammals and extant birds. Weishampel stated in 2006 that as a coelophysoid, Podokesaurus would have been a fleet-footed predator, with powerful forelimbs and grasping hands.

Lull found that fossil footprints named Grallator cursorius agreed with the foot and stride of Podokesaurus. These were abundant at a quarry in South Hadley (where they were found alongside large Otozoum moodii tracks), which he thought supported this identity. In 1926, Heilmann suggested that the foot of Procompsognathus was a better match for the G. cursorius tracks, due to the proportions of its toe bones. The paleontologist Wilhelm Bock stated in 1952 that while very similar Grallator tracks had been attributed to various small dinosaurs (such as Podokesaurus), he considered such correlations too specific, and that the best that could be said was such tracks represented small coelurosaurians. The writer Donald F. Glut suggested in 1997 that a slab with tracks from the Brunswick Formation of New York previously attributed to Coelophysis may instead have been produced by Podokesaurus, based on its Jurassic age. This formation is now known as the Passaic Formation, and instead thought to be Late Triassic in age.

== Paleoenvironment ==
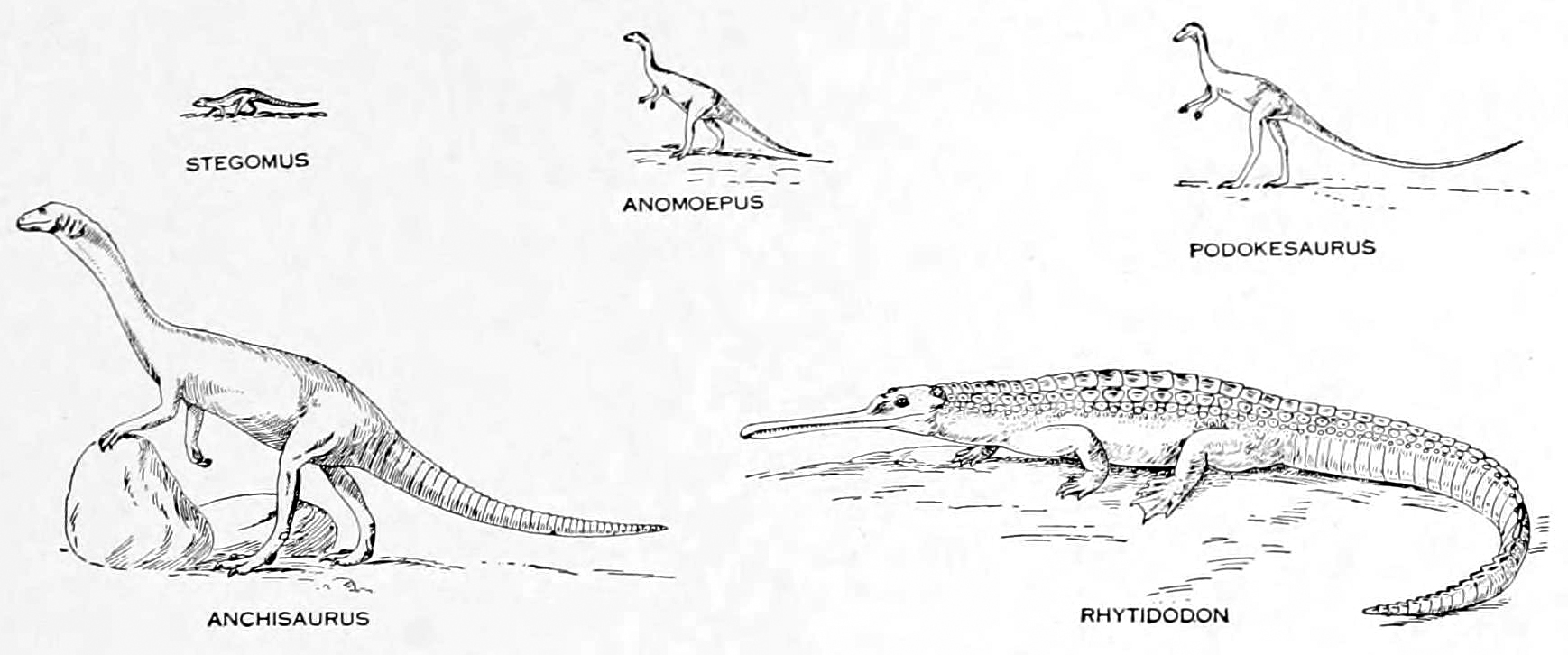
1917 restorations of animals from the Connecticut Valley then thought to have lived during the Triassic. The Portland Formation, which Podokesaurus is from, was redated to the Early Jurassic in 1977

The only known specimen of Podokesaurus is thought to have been collected from the Portland Formation (earlier known as the Portland Arkose) in the Hartford Basin of Massachusetts. The age of this formation has long been unclear (it was thought to be Triassic until 1977), but it is currently thought to date to the Hettangian–Sinemurian stages of the Early Jurassic, between 201 and 190 million years ago (earlier thought to be the Pliensbachian–Toarcian stages). In 2016, the paleontologist Robert E. Weems and colleagues suggested the Portland Formation should be elevated to a geological group within the Newark Supergroup (as the Portland Group), and thereby replacing the former name "Agawam Group". They also reinstated the Longmeadow Sandstone, where Podokesaurus was found, as a formation (within the uppermost Portland Group); it had earlier been considered identical to the Portland Formation.

The Portland Group represents the uppermost part of the Newark Supergroup, and was deposited after the Central Atlantic magmatic province was formed during the end of the Triassic and the beginning of the Jurassic. The Longmeadow Sandstone consists of fluvial (deposited by rivers and streams) red mudstones, sandstones, conglomerates, minor red eolian (deposited by wind) sandstones and siltstones. Other animals known from the formation include the sauropodomorph dinosaur Anchisaurus, the crocodylomorph Stegomosuchus, and fish such as Acentrophorus and Semionotus. Dinosaur tracks include the ichnogenera Anchisauripus, Anomoepus, Eubrontes, and Grallator.

== See also ==
- Timeline of coelophysoid research
