= Mignon Talbot =

American paleontologist

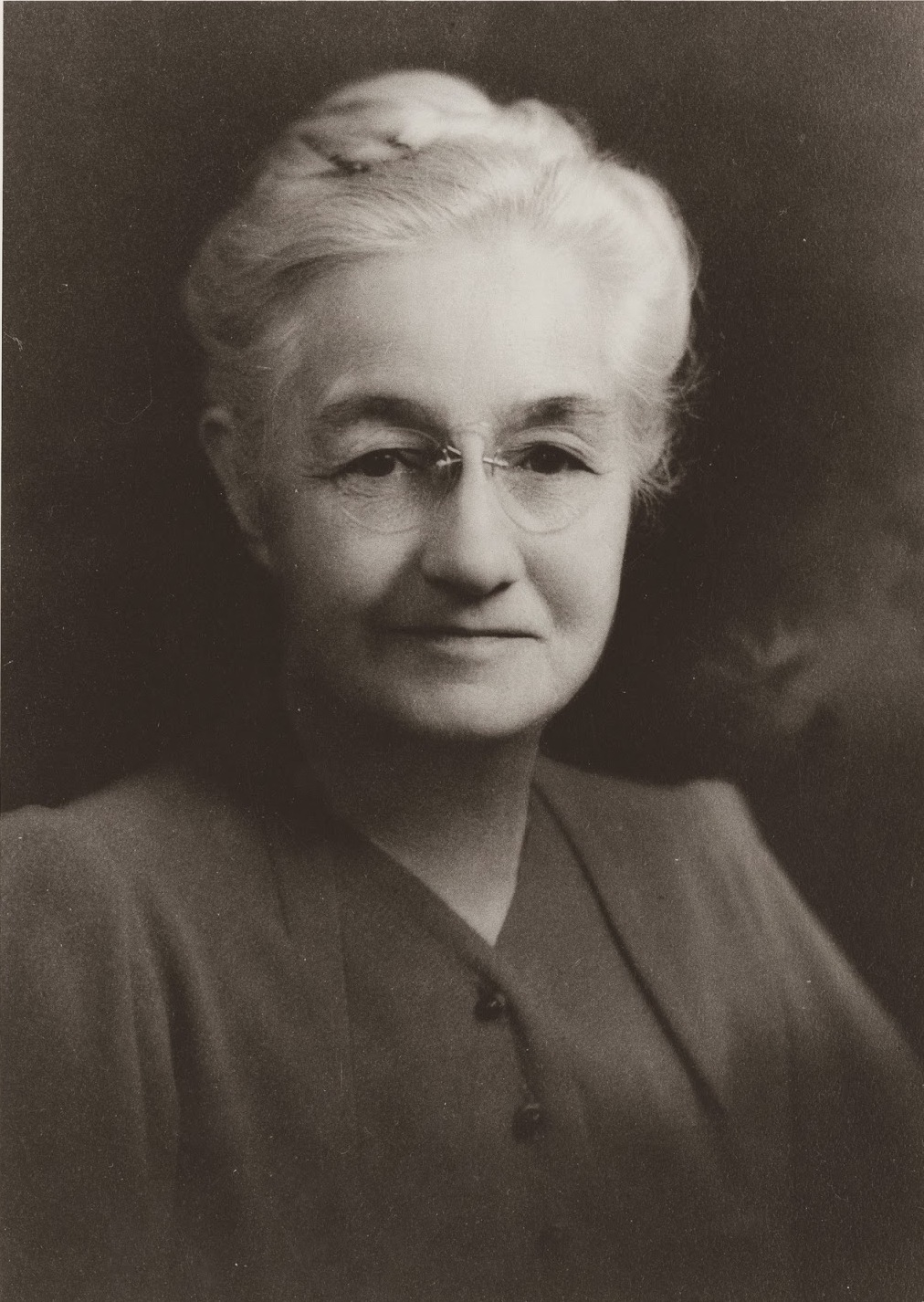
- Photograph at time of the discovery of Podokesaurus holyokensis in 1910
- Born: August 16, 1869; Iowa City, Iowa, U.S.
- Died: July 18, 1950 (aged 80); Holyoke, Massachusetts, U.S.
- Relatives: Ellen Bliss Talbot (sister)
- Scientific career
- Fields: Paleontology, geology, geography
- Workplaces: Mount Holyoke College

Mignon Talbot (August 16, 1869 – July 18, 1950) was an American paleontologist. Talbot recovered and named the only known fossils of the dinosaur Podokesaurus holyokensis, which were found near Mount Holyoke College in 1910, and published a scientific description of the specimen in 1911. In 1909 she became the first woman elected to be a member of the Paleontological Society. In the state of New York, she contributed to the Helderbergian crinoids and studied the faunas of Stafford limestone.

Born in Iowa City, Talbot received a Ph.D. in geology from Yale University in 1904, the first woman to do so. There she was a student of Charles Schuchert. She was named a professor of geology and geography at Mount Holyoke College in 1904. In 1908, Talbot became professor and chairman of the Geology department. In 1929, she became the chairman of both the Geology and Geography departments. During her thirty-one years at Mount Holyoke College, she amassed a large collection of invertebrate fossils and Triassic footprints and minerals. The museum burned down in 1917 and almost all the specimens were destroyed, including the one extant partial skeleton of Podokesaurus. Talbot retired in 1935 and is said to have remained passionate about her profession.

== Education ==
Talbot attended Ohio State University from 1888 to 1892, where she studied geology with Edward Orton and received her undergraduate degree. She received her doctorate degree in paleontology from Yale University in 1904 with a dissertation on Helderbergian crinoids from New York State.

== Research and findings ==
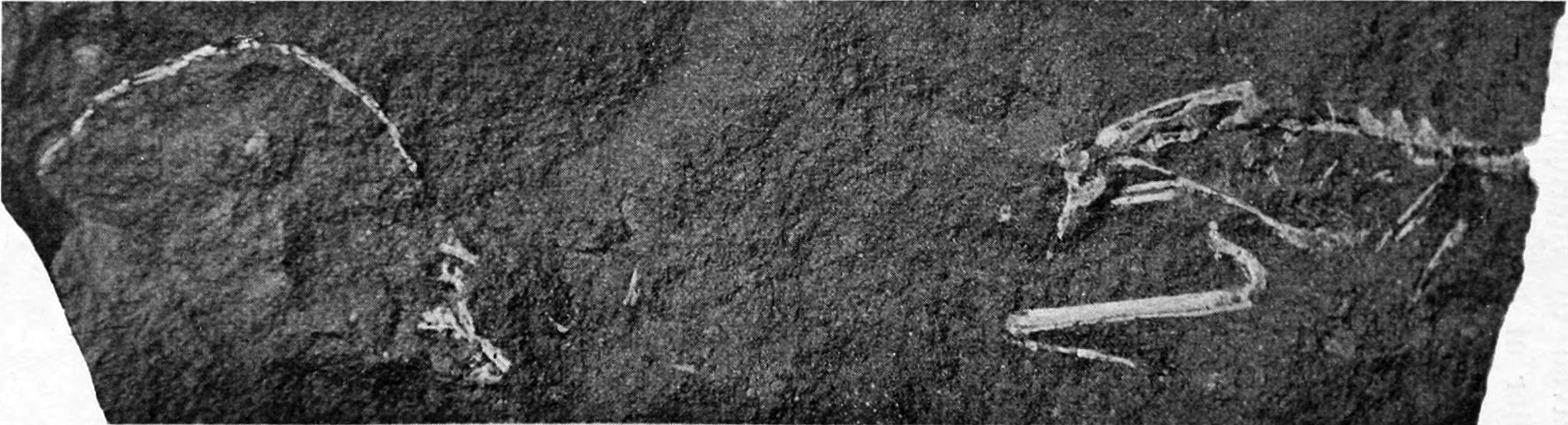
Podokesaurus fossil found and described by Talbot, the first non-bird dinosaur named by a woman

Talbot is the only known discoverer of fossils of the dinosaur Podokesaurus holyokensis, which she found near Mount Holyoke college where she was a professor. The location was by the Connecticut River between two outcroppings of mountains in a bed of sandstone. During a meeting at the Paleontological Society in December 1910, the dinosaur was first labelled as a herbivore by Talbot. As her research continued she subsequently identified the creature as theropod, in collaboration with Yale University professor Richard Swan Lull. A colleague of Lull, Friedrich von Huene, moved Podokesaurus holyokensis to a new family based on a genus. The specimen was formally described in June 1911 by Talbot, who thereby became the first woman to discover and name a non-bird dinosaur.

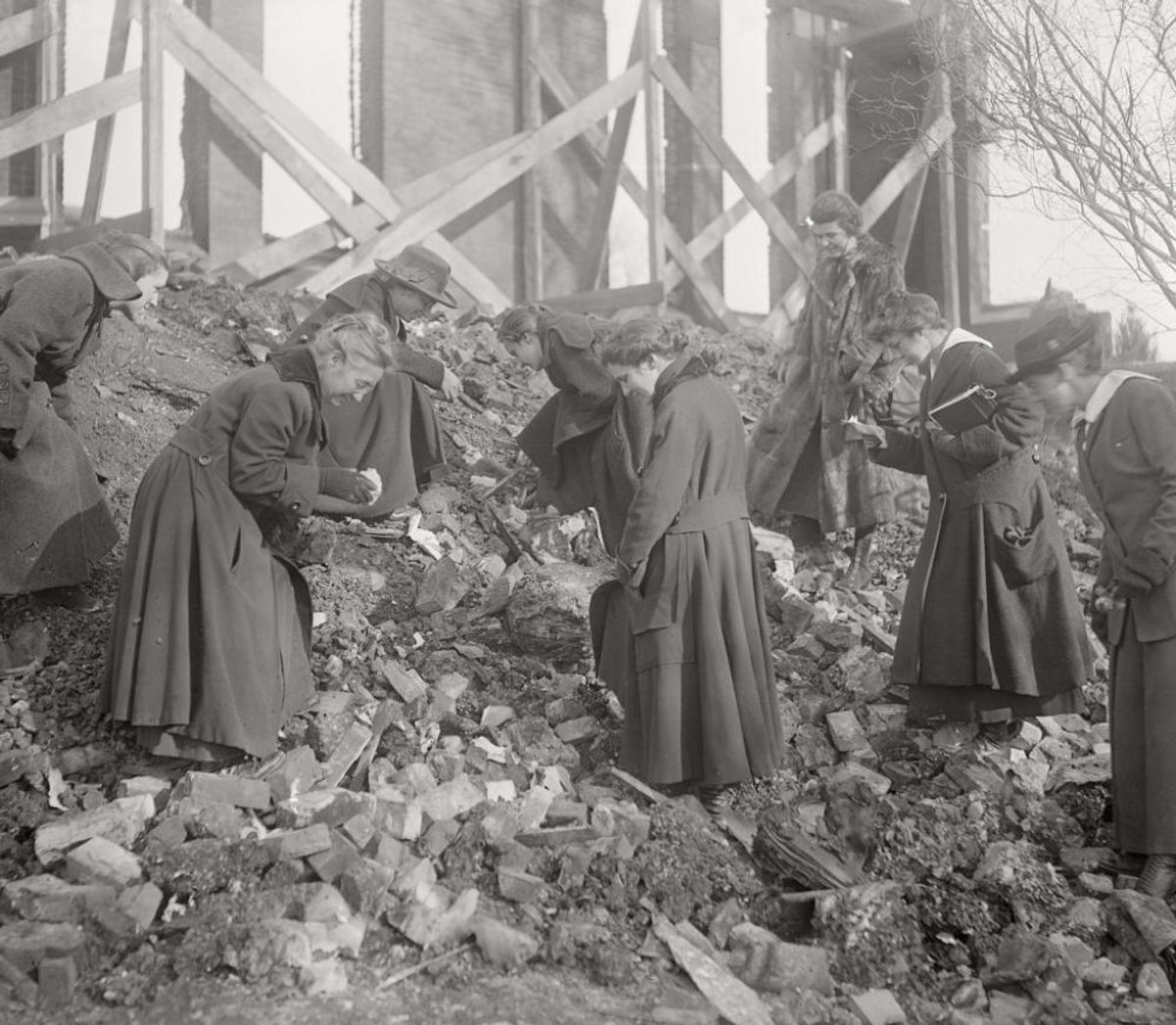
Talbot (second from left) and students searching the rubble of Williston Hall for fossils

Many of her research notes are considered historical artifacts. Talbot's contributions to geology were later reproduced in a collection decided upon by various scholars.

== Publications ==
- Talbot, M. (1903). A contribution to a list of the fauna of the Stafford limestone of New York. American Journal of Science, S4-16(166), 148-150.
- Talbot, M. (1904). Contribution to a revision of the (Lower Devonian) Helderbergian fauna of New York. (Publication No. 9919823.) [Doctoral thesis, Yale University]. ProQuest Dissertations & Theses Global. ISBN 978-0-599-18971-3.
- Talbot, M. (1905). Revision of the New York Helderbergian crinoids. American Journal of Science. S4-20(170), 17-34.
- Talbot, M. (1911). Podokesaurus holyokensis, a new dinosaur from the Triassic of the Connecticut Valley. American Journal of Science. S4-31(186), 469-479.
- Talbot, M. (October 1922). The Department of Geology. Mount Holyoke Alumnae Quarterly. October, 128-132.

== Personal life ==
Talbot's maternal grandfather was a doctor, and her father served as the superintendent of a school for deaf children. Even though her parents died within days of each other in 1899, by that time her family situation had allowed her to pursue a post-secondary education and further a career in academia. She served as a high school teacher in Columbus, Ohio even while continuing graduate work at the State University and at the same time "keeping up a home for [her younger] brothers." She left Ohio to continue her study of paleontology full time at Yale beginning in early 1903. She was one of four children, her sister being Dr. Ellen Bliss Talbot, a professor of philosophy at the same college—Mount Holyoke College—as Mignon, and two brothers, Herbert S. Talbot and Benjamin Talbot. Throughout her years of university, she was a member of Kappa Kappa Gamma sorority, serving on the national council of that organization, and Phi Beta Kappa. After her successful career as a paleontologist and professor, she retired to Stevens House, South Hadley.
