= Ellen Bliss Talbot =

American philosopher (1867–1968)

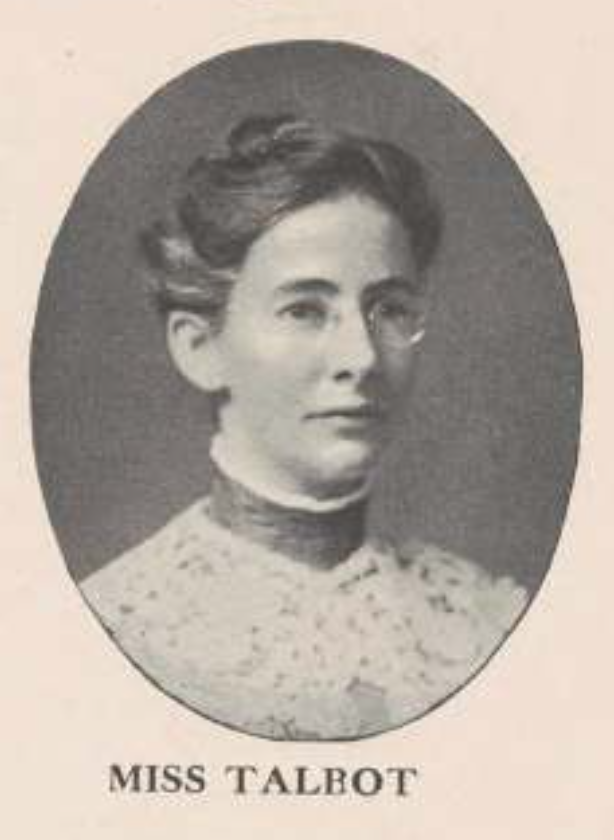
- Born: November 22, 1867; Iowa City, Iowa
- Died: January 25, 1968 (aged 100); Spartanburg, South Carolina
- Education: Ohio State University; Cornell University
- Occupations: Philosopher; Professor of Philosophy; Chair of the Department of Philosophy and Psychology
- Employer: Mount Holyoke College
- Relatives: Mignon Talbot (sister)

Ellen Bliss Talbot (22 November 1867 – 25 January 1968) was an American philosopher and professor of philosophy at Mount Holyoke College, chairing the department of philosophy and psychology for 32 years. She is considered one of the first professional academic women philosophers.

== Early life ==
Ellen Bliss Talbot was born on 22 November 1867 in Iowa City, Iowa, the second child and elder daughter of Benjamin and Harriet Bliss Talbot. Her sister was paleontologist Mignon Talbot - one of the first women to earn a PhD in geology from Yale University. Ellen earned her B.A. at Ohio State University in 1890, working until 1894 as a high school principal.

== Career ==
Talbot was Sage Scholar in Philosophy from 1895 to 1897, and Sage Fellow 1897–98, during which time she completed her PhD at Cornell University. Her thesis was titled "The Fundamental Principles of Fichte's Philosophy", and was published in the Cornell Studies in Philosophy series in 1906. All three of her published books were on the philosophy of Johann Gottlieb Fichte.

Until 1900, Talbot taught at Emma Willard School in Troy, New York, when she was appointed Professor of Philosophy at Mount Holyoke College in Massachusetts. During the summer of 1901, Talbot completed post-graduate studies at the University of Chicago, where she worked under John Dewey. In 1904, she studied at the University of Berlin, and the following spring at Heidelberg University.

By 1904, she was Chair of the Department of Philosophy and Psychology at Mount Holyoke, a position she retained until her retirement in 1936. Talbot was one of the founding and first female members of the American Philosophical Association. She published widely in journals including The Philosophical Review, Mind, and The American Journal of Psychology. Committed to women's higher education, and to the discipline of philosophy, she maintained high standards while at Mount Holyoake, "helping to ensure that the philosophy curriculum met the expectations of her fellow academicians as philosophy established itself as a profession."

Her own philosophy, as described by Dorothy Rogers, was comprised:

Roughly one-third of... discussions of philosophical problems, with considerations of human freedom and moral value dominating her interests. Fichte's influence is evident here, but not overwhelming; her own philosophy is more a general idealism than it is an expression of the thoughts of any one idealist.

Following her retirement, Talbot continued to teach part-time for several years.

== Death and legacy ==
Ellen Bliss Talbot died in Spartanburg, South Carolina on Thursday 25 January 1968, aged 100.

A detailed summary of Talbot's life and work appeared in Mary Ellen Waithe's 1995 A History of Women Philosophers. Talbot was one of a relatively small group of American women who completed doctoral work in philosophy during the 19th century, and had a successful academic career. She has since been described by Dorothy Rogers in The Dictionary of Modern American Philosophers as "one of the first truly professional academic women philosophers." Rogers has written that:

In short, Talbot was a significant philosophical thinker whose influence was felt in her time, and whose prominence among women thinkers makes her a fit subject for further study.
