= List of U.S. state dinosaurs =

This is a list of U.S. state dinosaurs in the United States, including the District of Columbia. Many states also have dinosaurs as state fossils, or designate named avian dinosaurs (List of U.S. state birds), but this list only includes those that have been officially designated as "state dinosaurs".

== List of dinosaurs for states and other regions in the US ==
State or Territory	Dinosaur	Image	Year
Arizona	Sonorasaurus thompsoni		2018
Arkansas	Arkansaurus fridayi		2017
California	Augustynolophus morrisi		2017
Connecticut	Dilophosaurus sp.		2017-07-10
Delaware	Dryptosaurus aquilunguis		2022
District of Columbia	"Capitalsaurus"		1998
Idaho	Oryctodromeus cubicularis		2023
Massachusetts	Podokesaurus holyokensis		2021
Maryland	Astrodon johnstoni		1998
Missouri	Parrosaurus missouriensis		2004
New Jersey	Hadrosaurus foulkii		1991
Oklahoma	Acrocanthosaurus atokensis		2006
Texas	Sauroposeidon proteles (originally Paluxysaurus jonesi)		2009 (replaced Pleurocoelus which was state dinosaur 1997–2009)
Utah	Utahraptor ostrommaysi		2018
Washington	"Suciasaurus rex"		2023
Wyoming	Triceratops horridus		1994

== List of candidate dinosaurs ==
This is for dinosaurs that were or are candidates for state dinosaur but either were not designated or have yet to officially be.

State	Dinosaur	Image	Year	Result
Alaska	Nanuqsaurus hoglundi		2025	????
Arizona	Dilophosaurus wetherilli		1998	Vetoed when it was revealed fossils were illegally taken from Navajo Nation
Massachusetts	Anchisaurus polyzelus		2021	Lost to Podokesaurus in a poll taken prior to bill

== See also ==
- List of U.S. state birds
- List of U.S. state fossils
- Lists of U.S. state insignia
