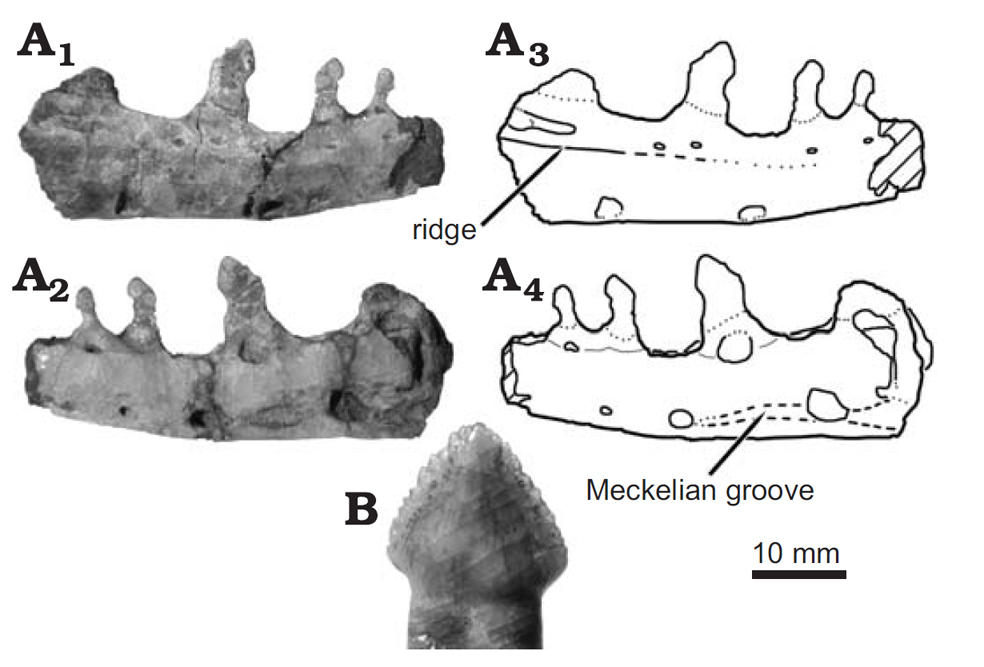
- Holotype right dentary bone of the lower jaw in outer and inner view (A) and close-up of an assigned tooth (B)

Scientific classification
- Kingdom: Animalia
- Phylum: Chordata
- Class: Reptilia
- Clade: Dinosauria (?)
- Clade: †Ornithischia (?)
- Family: †Silesauridae
- Clade: †Sulcimentisauria
- Genus: †Diodorus; Kammerer, Nesbitt, & Shubin, 2012
- Species: †D. scytobrachion

Binomial name
- †Diodorus scytobrachion Kammerer, Nesbitt, & Shubin, 2012

= Diodorus scytobrachion =

Diodorus Temporal range: Late Triassic, late Carnian (~230 Ma) – early Norian?

Extinct species of reptile

Diodorus is a genus of silesaurid dinosauromorph (member of a clade that includes the dinosaurs) that lived during the Late Triassic in what is now Morocco. Fossils were discovered in the Timezgadiouine Formation of the Argana Basin, and were used to name the new genus and species Diodorus scytobrachion. The genus name honors the mythological king Diodorus and the ancient historian Diodorus Siculus; the specific name is ancient Greek for 'leathery arm' and also honors the mythographer Dionysius Scytobrachion. The holotype specimen is a partial dentary bone (front of the lower jaw), and assigned specimens include isolated teeth, two humeri (upper arm bones), a metatarsal (foot bone), and femur (thigh bone).

Diodorus is estimated to have been up to 2.3 m (7.5 ft) long, and features thought to be shared by most silesaurs include a beak-like front of the lower jaw, leaf-shaped teeth, long limbs, and a quadrupedal posture. Diodorus differs from other silesaurids in having forward-tilted teeth that decrease in size towards the front of the jaw, and in having a distinct ridge on the side of the jaw running parallel to the tooth socket margin. The Meckelian groove is distinct in that it expands in height towards the back, and the dentary is distinguished by being bowed at the underside. The femur measures 92 mm (3.6 in) in length and the femoral head has a rather straight front edge instead of rounded like in most other archosaurs. As in other silesaurids, but unlike all other archosaurs, there is a distinct notch below the femur's head.

Within the clade Silesauridae, Diodorus has been grouped in Sulcimentisauria. Silesauridae is generally considered a sister group of the dinosaurs within the wider group Dinosauromorpha; some subsequent studies have suggested it was either a group of ornithischian dinosaurs or a paraphyletic (unnatural) group, consisting of basal (early diverging) ornithischians instead of being a sister group to all of Dinosauria. Although most silesaurids are inferred to have been herbivorous based on the shape of their teeth, coprolites (fossil dung) assigned to Silesaurus contain beetles, which shows they were not strictly plant-eaters. Their long forelimbs and short hindlimbs indicate they were quadrupedal, but they could probably also run bipedally. The Timezgadiouine Formation is probably late Carnian in age, dating to about 230 million years ago, which would make Diodorus one of the few silesaurids known from this time.

== Discovery ==
The first fossils of this taxon were discovered by a team from Harvard University in the northeastern Argana Basin, 2.9 km (1.8 mi) east of Imziln, Morocco, with support from the National Geographic Society and permission from the Moroccan Ministry of Energy and Mines. The remains were found in a quarry at the Irohalene Mudstone Member of the Timezgadiouine Formation, as part of a layer of disarticulated specimens that included fossils of phytosaurs, prolacertiforms, fish, and temnospondyls.

Diagram showing known remains; blue is the holotype dentary, green an assigned metatarsal, orange an assigned humerus, and red an assigned femur

In 2012, the paleontologists Christian F. Kammerer, Sterling J. Nesbitt, and Neil H. Shubin scientifically described the remains, and identified them as representing the first skeletal fossil record of the group Silesauridae from North Africa. Based on these fossils, they named the new genus and species Diodorus scytobrachion; the generic name refers to Diodorus, a mythological king of the Berber people and son of Sufax, the founder of Tangier, and also honors Diodorus Siculus, a 1st-century Greek historian who wrote about North Africa. The specific name is ancient Greek for 'leathery arm', in reference to the possible integument (external tissue) of the animal, and also honors Dionysius Scytobrachion, a classical mythographer who chronicled the mythical history of North Africa.

The very delicate holotype specimen is the front part of a right dentary bone (the tooth-bearing front part of the lower jaw) missing the front tip and preserving six tooth sockets with four teeth (three with tooth crowns), and is cataloged as specimen MHNM−ARG 30 at the Museum d'Histoire Naturelle de Marrakech. Assigned specimens include the much better preserved isolated teeth MHNM−ARG 31, 32, and 33, the two humeri (upper arm bones) MHNM−ARG 34 and 35, the metatarsal (a foot bone) MHNM−ARG 36, and the femur (thigh bone) MHNM−ARG 37, which is crushed from front to back. Although these elements were not found associated with each other, and probably represent different individuals, the describers assigned them all to Diodorus based on comparison with the holotype (in the case of the isolated teeth), or on the silesaurid or dinosauriform features of the bones. The latter was based on the assumption that there would only be one silesaurid present in this member of the Timezgadiouine Formation, as is probably the case for other localities where silesaurids are known, according to the describers.

== Description ==
Estimated size, scaled from individual bone measurements

Diodorus is estimated to have been up to 2.3 m (7.5 ft) long, and has been described as being a "small" silesaurid. Features thought to be shared by most silesaurs include a beak-like front of the lower jaw, leaf-shaped (or folidont) teeth, long limbs, and a quadrupedal posture. Small-bodied, ancestral ornithodirans (the group that includes dinosauromorphs and pterosaurs) may have had filamentous (fuzzy) integument covering their bodies to retain heat.

=== Lower jaw ===
The holotype dentary bone of the lower jaw has a distinct lateral ridge slightly above mid-height on its outer surface. It is well-developed at the hind end of the bone fragment, at the level of the sixth tooth position, and weakens frontwards until it disappears under the second tooth position. This ridge, running parallel to the tooth socket margin, is only known from Diodorus among silesaurids, and is therefore considered an autapomorphy (a distinguishing or diagnostic feature) of this genus. There is a row of nutrient foramina (which allowed blood to supply the bone with nutrients) between the tooth socket margin of the dentary and the ridge on the side. As in all silesaurids except Asilisaurus, the Meckelian groove is placed on the lower edge of the dentary's inner surface, and this groove is relatively tall compared to the very narrow grooves of Sacisaurus and Silesaurus. The Meckelian groove does not extend in front of the second tooth position, unlike in Sacisaurus and Silesaurus where the groove extends frontwards through the dentary symphysis (where the two halves of the lower jaw connect). The Meckelian groove differs from that of other silesaurids in that it expands in height towards the back, and reaches 40% of the dentary's height by the fourth tooth position. The dentary is distinct in being bowed at the underside.

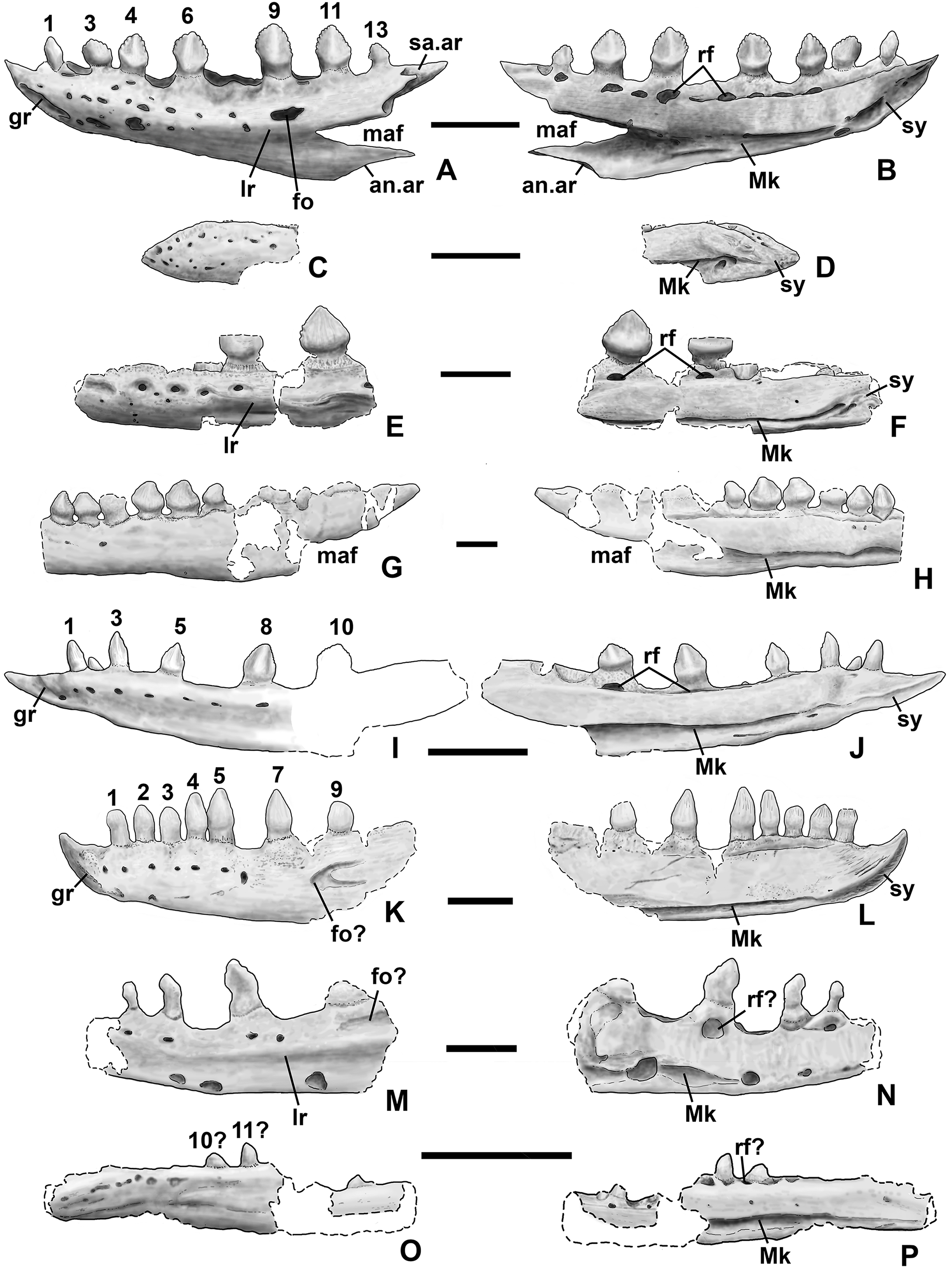
Silesaurid dentaries compared; M-N is Diodorus (reversed for comparison)

The roots of the four preserved teeth are firmly fused to their sockets (the ankylothecodont condition), like in all silesaurids except possibly Lewisuchus and in non-archosauriform archosauromorphs, but unlike other members of Archosauria. The three preserved tooth crowns are triangular with denticles (serrations) on the front and back edges, as in all silesaurids except Lewisuchus and Asilisaurus, narrow, and tilted (or canted) forwards. The forwards tilt of all the frontmost teeth (at an angle of about 20 degrees from the root) is a distinct feature of Diodorus, but the frontmost tooth of Sacisaurus has a similar angle. The three crowns decrease in size towards the front of the dentary (the crown height of the first tooth is about 66% of the second tooth, which is about 60% of the fourth tooth), as is also the case for Sacisaurus. The assigned isolated teeth are very similar to the fourth tooth of the holotype, but more bulbous at their bases and larger overall, which indicates they were either from further back in the jaw or from a larger individual. The teeth of Diodorus have 4–5 denticles per 5 mm (0.2 in), which is coarser than the 6–7 denticles per 5 mm of Silesaurus, are proportionally broader and lack longitudinal striations. The tooth crowns are generally similar in proportions to those of Technosaurus and Sacisaurus, but can be distinguished from the former in lacking an accessory cusp, and from the latter in lacking a cingulum, and in that the crown base is more abruptly expanded and spade-shaped.

=== Limb bones ===
The humerus of Diodorus was elongated and rather featureless apart from the distinct ectepicondyle and entepicondyle (the projections on each side of the condyle of the humerus) that are separated by a prominent furrow at the lower side. The shaft of the humerus is very straight, and the long sides of the upper and lower ends are in the same plane when viewed from above and below. The head of the humerus is weakly developed and asymmetrical, with the inward portion expanding. The upper and lower ends of the humerus are weakly expanded in relation to the shaft, similar to Silesaurus among archosaurs on the line leading to birds. The deltopectoral crest extends one third of the humerus' length, but its top is located at the upper tip of the humerus similar to Silesaurus, and unlike the condition in dinosaurs, where the top of the crest is about 30% down the shaft.

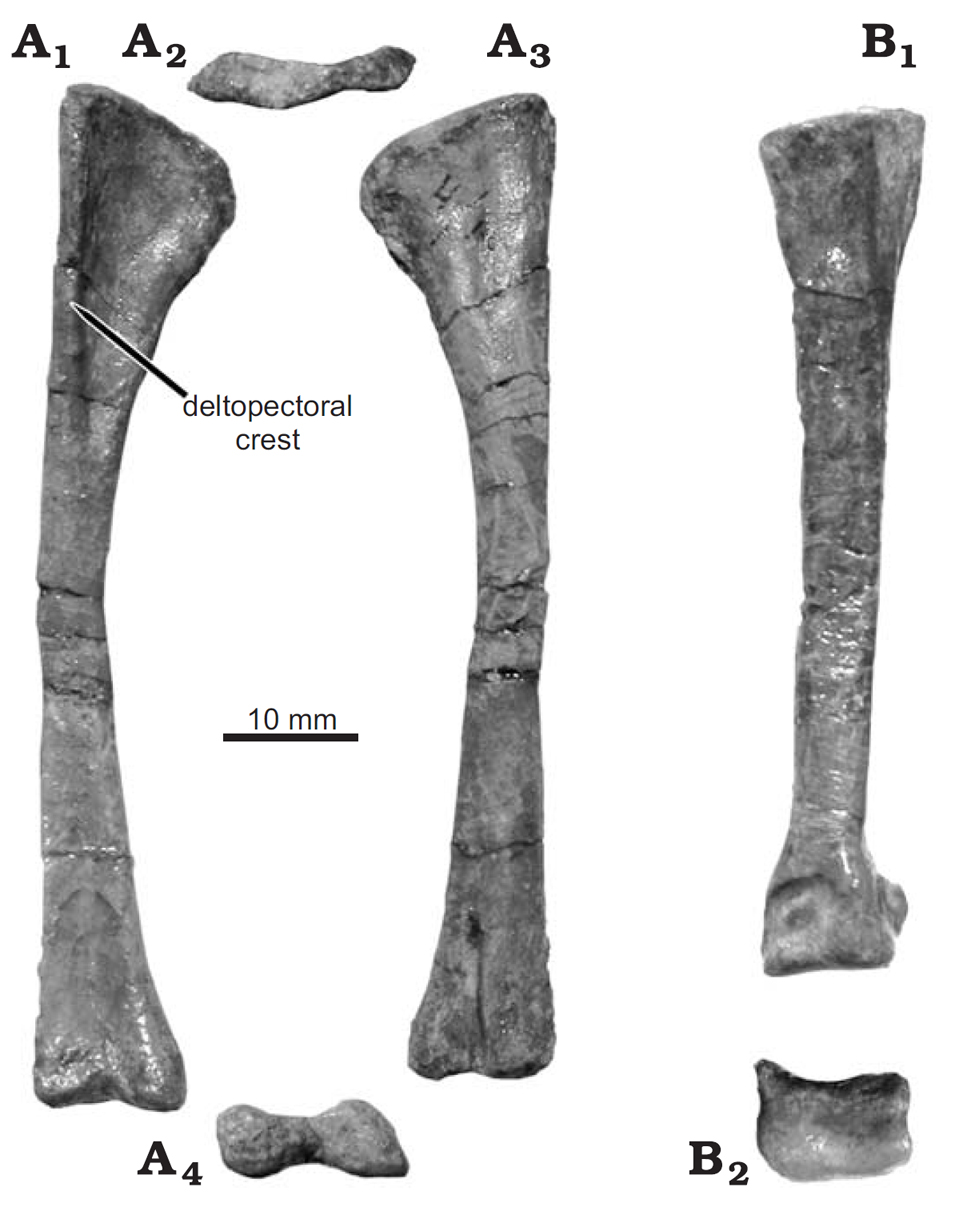
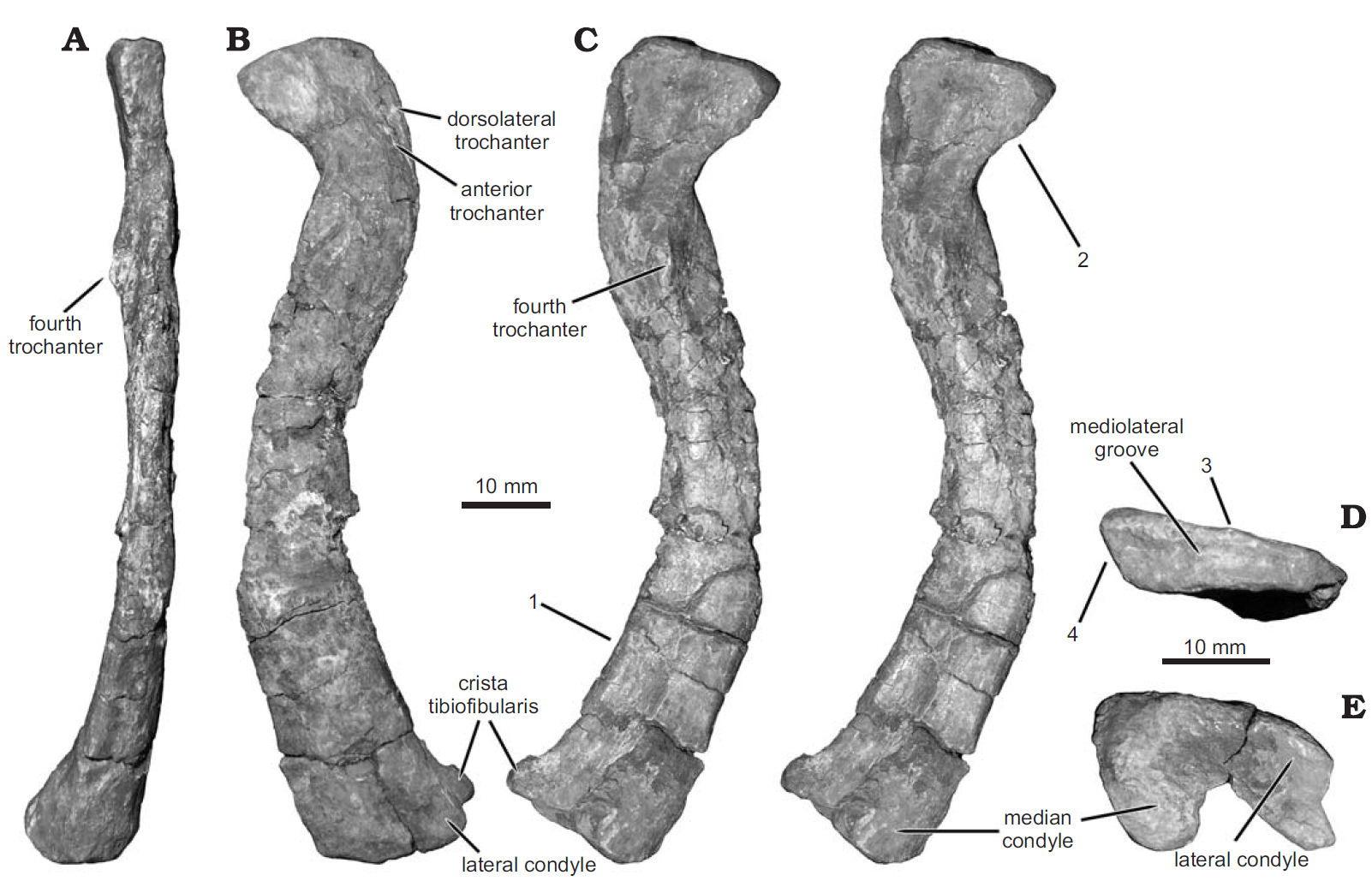
Assigned right humerus and metatarsal (A and B, left) and left femur in multiple views (right)

The single known femur assigned to Diodorus measures 92 mm (3.6 in) in length. The head of the femur is triangular when seen from above, with a rather straight front edge as in Sacisaurus and Silesaurus, instead of rounded like in most other archosaurs. As in other silesaurids, but unlike all other archosaurs, there is a distinct notch below the femur's head. A straight groove runs across the upper surface of the femur's head. The anterior trochanter is small and projects upwards, and there is a distinct, blade-shaped dorsolateral trochanter next to it. A "finger-shaped" anterior trochanter, the lack of a trochanteric shelf, and a blade-like dorsolateral trochanter are also seen in Sacisaurus and Silesaurus. The fourth trochanter of Diodorus is in a position similar to Silesaurus and further up the femur than in Sacisaurus, though less developed than in either, is crescent-shaped, and has a sharp rim.

The lower end of the femur is only slightly more expanded than the rest of the shaft, and the lower surface has a rounded depression. The crista tibiofibularis (a crest on the femur) and the medial and lateral condyles (rounded parts of the lower end of the femur) are rounded on their backsides, and the side of the lateral condyle is rounded like in other dinosauriforms. The ridges that extend upwards from the crista tibiofibularis and the medial condyle extend for more than one quarter of the femur's shaft, like in Sacisaurus, Silesaurus, and Asilisaurus. The only known metatarsal is elongated as in Silesaurus and has a robust rim for attachment of extensor muscles. It is unclear which digit it belonged to, but it was possibly the third, based on its rectangular profile when viewed from the lower end, and its symmetry from side to side.

== Classification ==
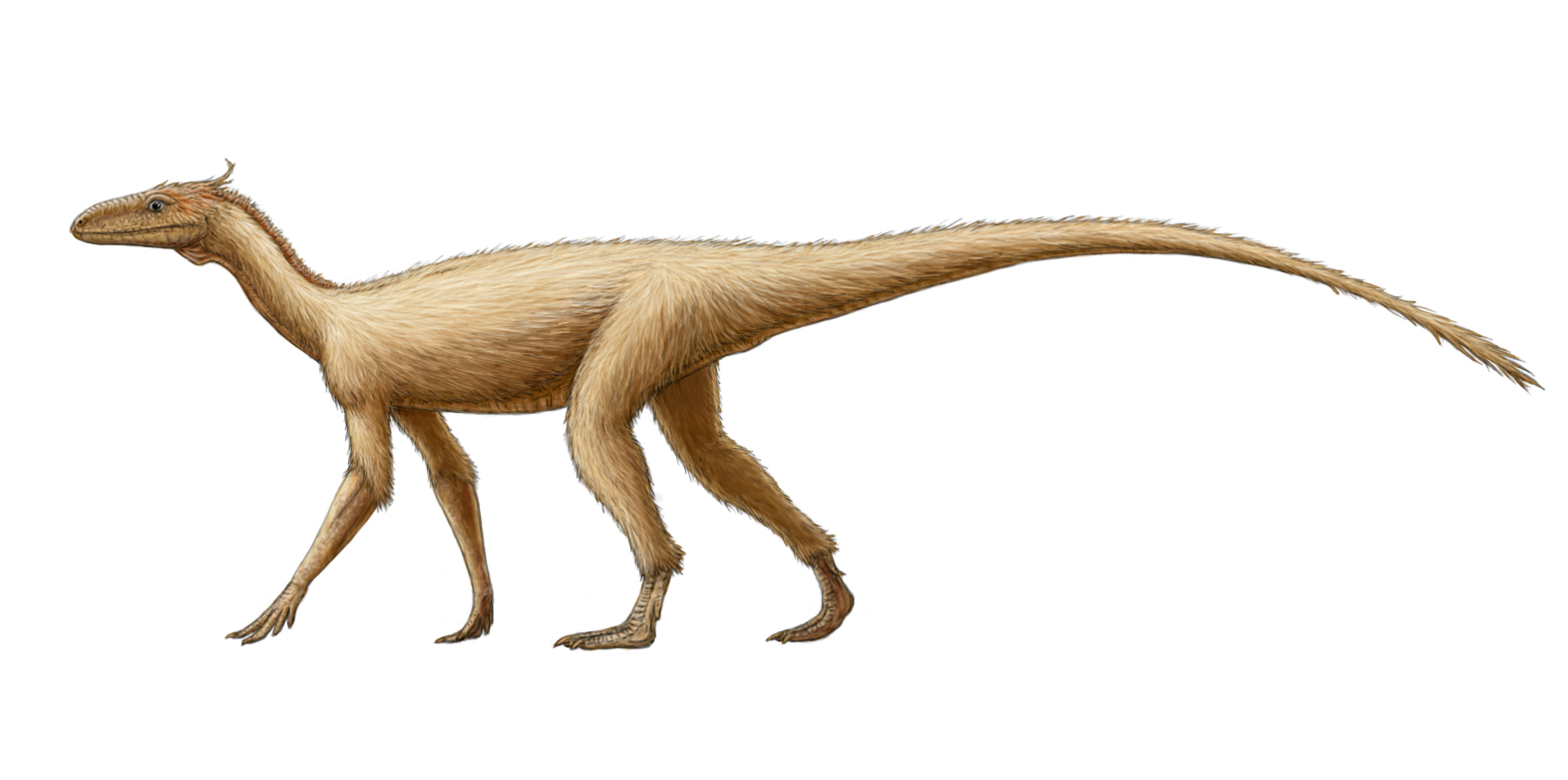
Life restoration showing Diodorus in quadrupedal pose and with hypothetical fuzzy integument

The reptile group Archosauria had diverged into two lineages by the Middle Triassic, the crocodilian line Pseudosuchia, and the line leading to birds, Ornithodira, which includes the group Dinosauromorpha. Only fragmentary specimens of non−dinosaurian dinosauromorphs (basal or early diverging members of the clade that includes dinosaurs) from Argentina were recognized until the 21st century, when their larger taxonomic diversity, and geographic and stratigraphic range was realized. A previously unknown group was first recognized upon the discovery of Silesaurus from Poland, and features similar to this animal were later identified in new and previously discovered taxa from the Americas and Africa. Features suggested to unite this group include long necks, long limbs, quadrupedality, dentary "beaks" on the lower jaw, and leaf-shaped front teeth that indicate herbivory or omnivory. Based on these shared features, Nesbitt and colleagues named the new clade Silesauridae in 2010, as an early sister group of Dinosauria. They did not find silesaurids to be basal dinosaurs, due to their lacking some important features of that group, and suggested that silesaurids and ornithischian and sauropodomorph dinosaurs independently evolved their similar teeth and diet from carnivorous ancestors. They inferred that the various lineages within Ornithodira (such as dinosaurs and silesaurids) must have diverged from each other by the late Anisian stage of the early Middle Triassic, about 242 million years ago.

In their 2012 phylogenetic analysis, Kammerer and colleagues obtained identical results when all known Diodorus material or just the holotype was included. They found Diodorus to be well-supported as a member of Silesauridae, and deeply nested within this group in a clade with Sacisaurus and Silesaurus, with the former as a sister taxon. Diodorus and Sacisaurus share the frontwards decrease in dentary tooth size and the frontmost tooth being tilted forwards. The Meckelian groove of Sacisaurus extends to the front of the dentary through its beak-like tip, but that of Diodorus does not even reach the front of the toothed part of the dentary, which the describers considered an evolutionary reversal. They stated that the discovery of a silesaurid in Morocco demonstrates that the group continued to be present in Africa during the late Triassic (the earliest known African silesaurid at that point was Asilisaurus from the early Middle Triassic of Tanzania). Although fossilized footprints had earlier indicated the presence of dinosauromorphs in the Timezgadiouine Formation, Diodorus is the first definitive silesaurid record, which supports the idea that this group had a cosmopolitan distribution in the Middle−to−Late Triassic. They suggested that basal dinosauromorphs were widespread, temporally long-ranging, and common rather than rare and restricted in time and space in Triassic fossil assemblages. They speculated that this pattern had only been recently recognized due to specimens being misidentified as true dinosaurs and the rather low potential of these small-bodied, delicate animals being preserved.

In 2014, the paleontologists Max C. Langer and Jorge Ferigolo fully described the anatomy of Sacisaurus and reanalyzed earlier phylogenetic studies of silesaurids. They found Diodorus and Sacisaurus to be sister taxa but, along with Silesaurus itself, to be the only unambiguous members of Silesauridae. Most earlier studies had found them to be dinosauromorphs outside Dinosauria itself, but these researchers did not find it unlikely that silesaurids belonged within Dinosauria, as a basal branch of Ornithischia. This scenario had been suggested earlier by other researchers but without an in-depth analysis, and though Langer and Ferigolo filled that gap, they did not find it a robust hypothesis. Most studies agree that dinosaurs emerged through rapid diversification and anatomical changes during the Late Triassic; if the Middle Triassic silesaurids were nested within Ornithiscia this would mean that the evolutionary radiation of dinosaurs occurred over a longer period, with the split between ornithischian and saurischian dinosaurs (the two major groups within Dinosauria) happening already during the Middle Triassic. In 2017, the paleontologist Matthew G. Baron and colleagues suggested a new scheme of dinosaur interrelationships, which grouped theropods with ornithischians instead of with sauropodomorphs as has traditionally been accepted, and still found Silesauridae to be a sister group of Dinosauria. They speculated that dinosaurs could have been ancestrally omnivorous, as silesaurids like Diodorus appear to have been herbivorous, but noted that this idea was made uncertain because more basal silesaurids like Lewisuchus appear to have been carnivorous.

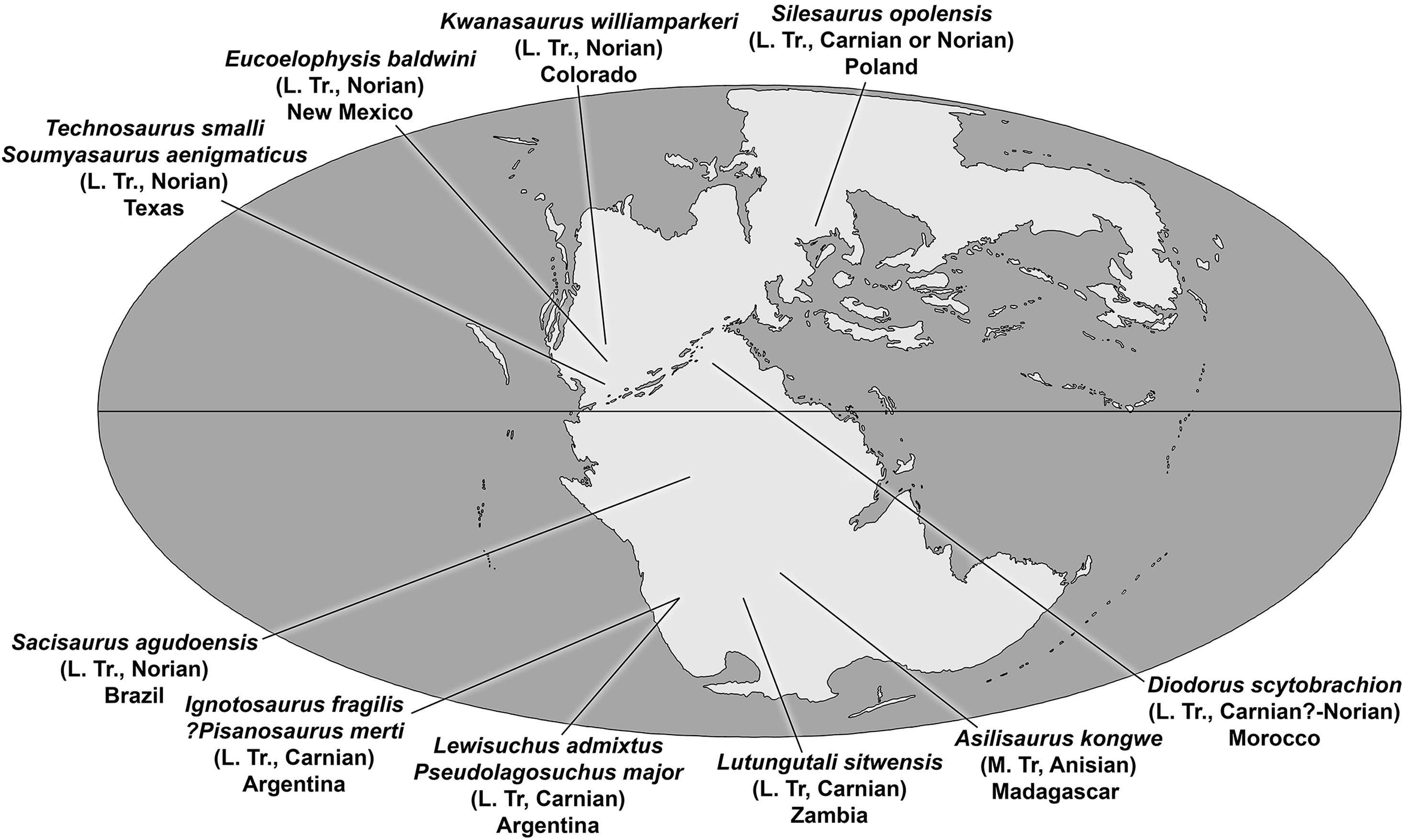
Distribution of silesaurids shown on a Middle-Late Triassic map of the supercontinent Pangea, with Diodorus at the upper middle

The 2019 phylogenetic analysis of Silesauridae by the paleontologists Jeffrey W. Martz and Bryan J. Small recovered Diodorus as sister taxon of Lutungutali, which they found interesting since both were from Africa, while Eucoelophysis and Kwanasaurus from western North America were also each other's sister taxa. When including the little known taxa Ignotosaurus, Technosaurus, and Soumyasaurus in their analysis, Silesauridae ceased being a natural group, with all silesaurids collapsing into a polytomy with ornithischians and sauropodomorphs, but when those problematic taxa were removed, Silesauridae became the sister group of Dinosauria, as in most previous analyses. They named the new clade Sulcimentisauria to include silesaurids with Meckelian grooves placed low on the dentaries, including Diodorus. Based on their analysis and age estimates they concluded that Silesauridae originated in the Early or Middle Triassic in the southern part of Gondwana (part of the supercontinent Pangea), with the sulcimentisaurians spreading from there to the northern landmass Laurasia during the Late Triassic. They noted that the overall pattern of silesaurid evolution appears to have been a shift from carnivory (typified by ziphodont and conical teeth) to herbivory throughout the Triassic, when sulcimentisaurians developed mainly leaf-shaped teeth, similar to the convergent development in sauropodomorphs which also became specialized for herbivory in the Late Triassic.

The following cladogram shows the placement of Diodorus among Silesauridae according to Martz and Small, 2019:

- Dinosauromorpha
  - Lagerpetidae
    - Lagerpeton
    - - Dromomeron
  - Dinosauriformes
    - Marasuchus
    - - Dinosauria
      - Silesauridae
        - Lewisuchus
        - - Asilisaurus
          - Sulcimentisauria
            - Silesaurus
            - - Sacisaurus
              - - Lutungutali
                - Diodorus
              - - Eucoelophysis
                - Kwanasaurus

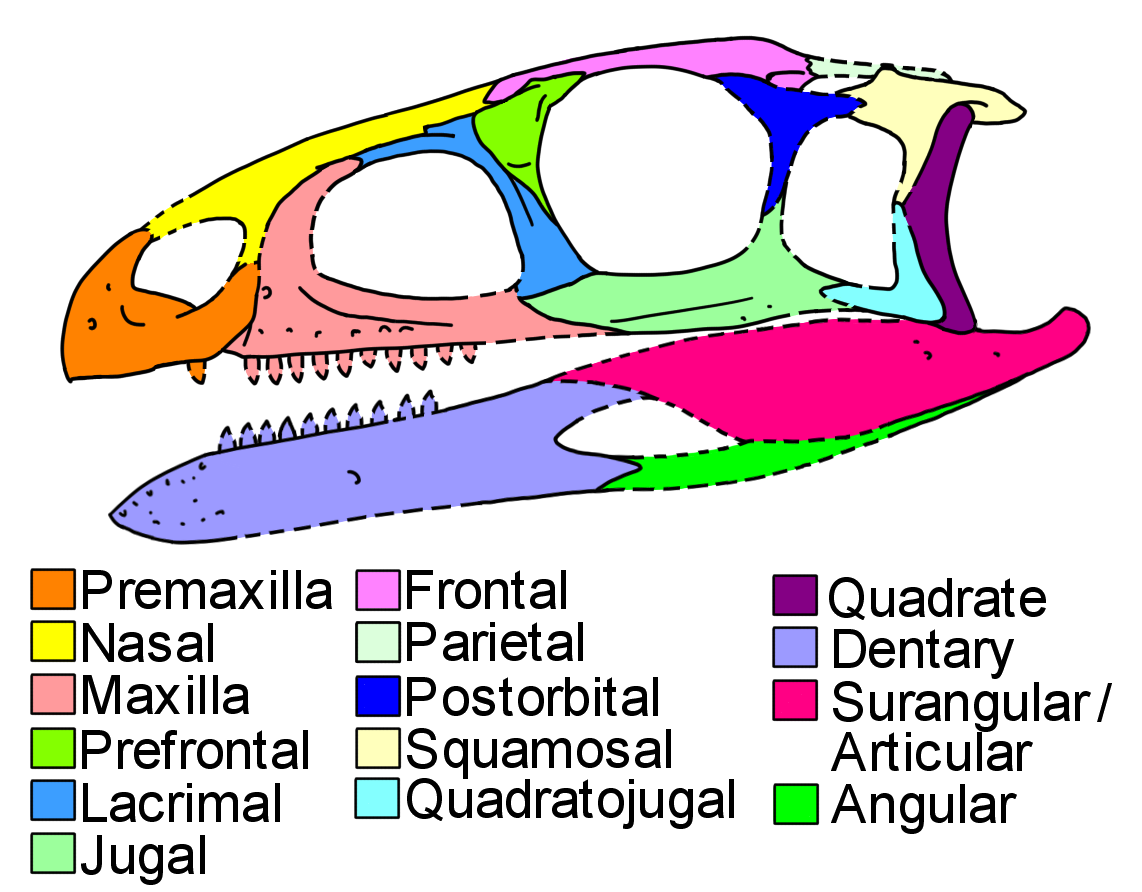
Skull diagram of the related Asilisaurus

In 2020 the paleontologists Rodrigo Temp Müller and Maurício Silva Garcia found silesaurids to be a stem-group leading to "core" ornithischian dinosaurs, which would make silesaurids themselves a paraphyletic (unnatural) group, consisting of basal ornithischians instead of a sister group to all of Dinosauria. They found Sulcimentisauria to include all "core" ornithischians and most silesaurids, and Silesauridae itself would only include Silesaurus and Ignotosaurus. The authors found this scenario interesting as it would fill most of the ghost lineages leading to ornithischians in the Triassic (the fossil record of ornithischians is lacking for this period). Following this hypothesis, the ornithischians that emerged during the Jurassic evolved from "silesaurids" during the Middle to early Late Triassic, and typical "silesaurids" themselves disappeared during the Late Triassic. Ornithischians would thereby be the first group of dinosaurs to have developed an omnivorous/herbivorous diet during their "silesaurid" stage, the earliest known member Lewisuchus (with its recurved teeth) having been carnivorous. Their scenario suggests that ornithischian and sauropodomorph dinosaurs evolved herbivory independently during the Triassic; earlier hypotheses would mean both groups as well as silesaurids had evolved herbivory independently.

A 2022 study by the paleontologist David B. Norman and colleagues expanded on the dataset of Müller and Garcia's 2020 analysis (by for example including early Jurassic ornithischians) and also found silesaurids to be a paraphyletic group on the branch leading to traditional Ornithischia. They therefore referred to silesaurids by the informal terms "silesaurs" or "silesaurians", and used the name Prionodontia for the clade that only includes traditional ornithischians to the exclusion of "silesaurs". The authors found that the new analysis gave insights into how anatomical characters had evolved step-wise within Ornithischia from the "silesaur" condition, including in features of the mandible, dentition (with implications for diet), and the construction of the limbs and limb-girdles (with implications for posture and gait). It also made new interpretations of the origin in time and geographic distribution of early dinosaurs possible. For example, the earliest ornithischian "silesaurs" had sharp, recurved, and finely serrated teeth typical of theropod as well as early sauropodomorph dinosaurs, while the teeth of intermediate "silesaurs" closer to Prionodonta, like Diodorus and Silesaurus itself, had more diamond-shaped tooth crowns, and lastly those "silesaurs" closest to Prionodonta such as Kwanasaurus had teeth most similar to those of early prionodontans.

The cladogram below is based on the 2022 study by Norman and colleagues and shows Diodorus as an ornithischian dinosaur:

- Dinosauria
  - Saurischia
    - Herrerasauridae
    - - Daemonosaurus
      - - - Chindesaurus
          - Tawa
        - - Eodromaeus
          - - Sauropodomorpha
            - Theropoda
  - Ornithischia
    - Lewisuchus
    - - Soumyasaurus
      - - Asilisaurus
        - Sulcimentisauria
          - Diodorus
          - - Technosaurus
            - Parapredentata
              - - Ignotosaurus
                - Silesaurus
              - - - Sacisaurus
                  - - Lutungutali
                    - Kwanasaurus
                - - Eucoelophysis
                  - - Pisanosaurus
                    - - Laquintasaura
                      - Prionodontia
                        - Thyreophora
                          - Scutellosaurus
                          - - Emausaurus
                            - Scelidosaurus
                        - Neornithischia
                          - Eocursor
                          - - Lesothosaurus
                            - - Heterodontosauridae
                              - - Agilisaurus
                                - Hexinlusaurus

== Paleobiology ==
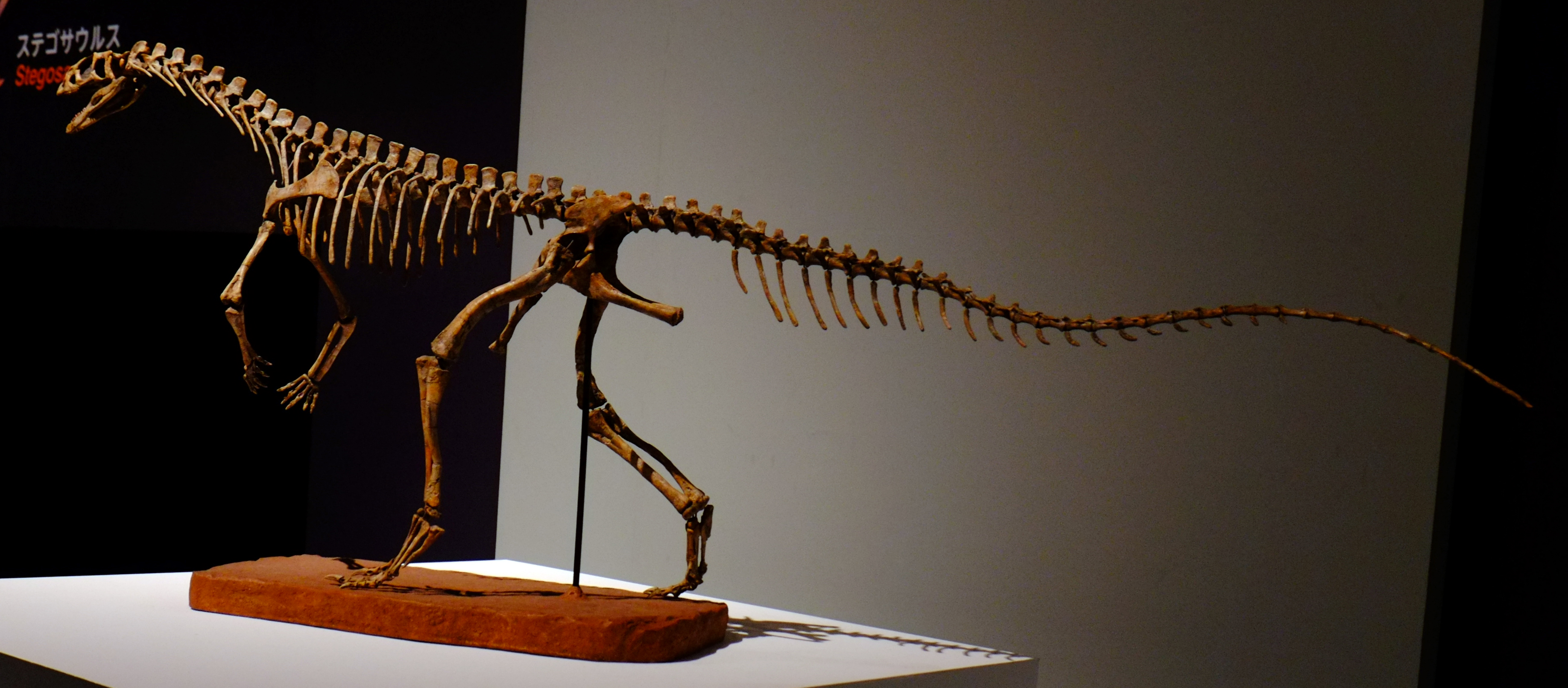
Reconstructed skeleton of the related Asilisaurus in bipedal pose

Herbivory has been suggested for silesaurids in general and Silesaurus in particular based on tooth shape, and a 2014 study by the paleontologists Tai Kubo and Mugino O. Kubo of microwear on its teeth found it consistent with herbivory, though omnivory could not be ruled out. A 2019 study by paleontologist Martin Qvarnström and colleagues examining coprolites (fossil dung) that contained beetles attributed them to Silesaurus based on size and other factors. These researchers suggested that although Silesaurus could exploit plant resources, it was not strictly a plant-eater. They pointed out that the teeth were not numerous or regularly spaced, and lacked the coarse serrations typical in herbivores. They hypothesized that the beak-like jaws were adapted for pecking small insects off the ground like modern birds.

Silesaurus and silesaurids in general have been considered quadrupedal due to their long, gracile forelimbs. In 2010, the paleontologists Rafał Piechowski and Jerzy Dzik considered such proportions typical of fast-running, quadrupedal animals, but noted that the long tail of Silesaurus which would have acted as a counterweight to the body, as well as the very gracile forelimbs, indicates it retained the ability for fast bipedal running. Piechowski and the paleontologist Mateusz Tałanda concluded in 2020 that the short hindlimbs combined with the elongated forelimbs supported the idea that it was strictly quadrupedal.

== Paleoenvironment ==
Diodorus is known from the base of the Irohalene Mudstone Member (a unit designated as t5) of the Timezgadiouine Formation in Morocco, a diverse assemblage of Triassic tetrapod animals (ancestrally four-limbed animals). This assemblage was previously thought to be of late Carnian age based on biostratigraphy, but detailed age data is lacking for the Triassic of North Africa. As the faunal assemblage of the Timezgadiouine Formation is complex and conflicting, Kammerer and colleagues considered it of either Carnian or Norian age in 2012. In 2013 Langer and colleagues pointed out that the Timezgadiouine Formation had since been correlated in time with the late Carnian Wolfville Formation of Nova Scotia, dating to about 230 million years ago, which would make Diodorus one of the few non-dinosaurian dinosauromorphs of this age. By 2014, Diodorus was one of two or three silesaurids known from the Late Carnian.

The t5 unit of the Irohalene Mudstone Member is characterized by cyclically stacked sandstone interbedded with mudstone, which was deposited in a semi-arid alluvial floodplain with meandering, ephemeral streams. Other fossil animals known from this assemblage include the phytosaur Arganarhinus, the metoposaurid Dutuitosaurus, the archosauromorph Azendohsaurus, the latiscopid Almasaurus, and the dicynodont Moghreberia. Fossilized tetrapod footprints are also known from there, such as the ichnogenera Parachirotherium, Atreipus, and Brachychirotherium.
