= Dionysius Scytobrachion =

Ancient Greek author

Dionysius Scytobrachion (Ancient Greek: Διονύσιος ὁ Σκυτοβραχίων) (Scytobrachion meaning 'leather arm'), also known as Dionysius of Mytilene (the capital of Lesbos), was the author of a series of stories set in the region now known as Libya. His works depicted the Olympian gods as mortals from a distant past, and subjects included the Amazons, Alexander the Great, and the Argonauts. The latter stories are included a six-book work known as the Argonautica, in which the captain of the Argo is Hercules (Heracles), rather than Jason, as in most modern stories. These stories were used as sources by Diodorus Siculus.

Dionysius's exact dates are not known. Previously, a comment in the works of Suetonius was used as a possible indication – Suetonius explains that others had claimed that Dionysius was contemporary with Marcus Antonius Gnipho, who was active in the first century BCE. Suetonius himself rejects the claim on chronological grounds, but his wording was taken by some to suggest that the chronological incongruency was not large, and that Dionysius could thus be dated to the second half of the second century BCE. However, a papyrus fragment of Dionysius's Argonautica dating to the late third century BCE suggest a date no later than 250 BCE.
