= Rewasaurus =

Rewasaurus Temporal range: Late Triassic, Carnian–Norian

Scientific classification
- Kingdom: Animalia
- Phylum: Chordata
- Class: Reptilia
- Clade: Dinosauria (?)
- Clade: †Ornithischia (?)
- Family: †Silesauridae
- Clade: †Sulcimentisauria
- Genus: †Rewasaurus; Sen et al., 2026
- Species: †R. minori

Binomial name
- †Rewasaurus minori Sen et al., 2026

Genus of silesaurid dinosauromorph

Rewasaurus (lit. 'Rewa Basin lizard') is an extinct genus of dinosauromorph allied with taxa traditionally regarded as silesaurids (possibly the earliest ornithischian dinosaurs). It is known from the Late Triassic (Carnian to Norian age) Tiki Formation of India. The genus contains a single species, Rewasaurus minori, known from a partial skull.

== Discovery and naming ==
The Rewasaurus minori holotype material consists of an incomplete skull and articulated mandible (lower jaw). It is permanently accessioned at the Indian Institute of Technology Kharagpur in West Bengal, India, under the code IITKGPR1191. Two isolated partial femora (thighbones) were also collected from the same formation, but a different locality; while they preserve silesaurid features, they cannot be confidently referred to Rewasaurus due to the lack of overlapping remains.

In 2026, Sulagna Sen and colleagues described Rewasaurus as a new genus and species of silesaurid dinosauriform. The generic name, Rewasaurus, refers to the Rewa Basin in Madhya Pradesh, India, from which the fossils were recovered. The specific name, minori, comes from the Latin word minor, meaning "small."

== Description ==
Rewasaurus is a small silesaurid, with a reconstructed skull length of ~7 cm (2.8 in). Sen et al. interpret the only known specimen as belonging to a mature individual based on the fused cranial sutures and well-developed dentition. Like other silesaurids, Rewasaurus has a relatively slender snout, heterodont dentition, and a toothless pointed tip of the dentary. Rewasaurus can be distinguished from other silesaurids based on the upper dentition being relatively short compared to the lower dentition, the dentary tip lying nearly level with the rest of the tooth-bearing edge, and the premaxilla bearing at least five teeth.

The upper jaw of Rewasaurus is known only from the partial premaxillae and maxillae with the teeth still in place. A hollow on the upper edge of the premaxilla is probably the narial fossa, which has been damaged due to taphonomic processes. The maxilla has a straight lower edge continuous with the lower edge of the premaxilla. Small nutrient foramina line the outer surface of the maxilla, with one per tooth, while two or three foramina are clustered at the tip of the premaxilla. The two bones meet along an angled, interdigitating suture. The edentulous tip of the dentary curves slightly upward, narrowing to a sharp point with an angle of 13° between the upper and lower edges. The bone has no ridge along its outer surface, contrasting with Diodorus, a possible close relative. Small foramina run irregularly along the bone below the tooth row.

== Classification ==
To test the relationships of Rewasaurus, Sen et al. (2026) inserted it into the phylogenetic matrices of Dalle-Laste et al. (2025) and Müller (2025). The Dalle-Laste et al. (2025) matrix recovered all silesaurids as a monophyletic clade, although its precise internal relationships could not be determined as many were recovered in an unresolved polytomy. The Müller (2025) matrix recovered silesaurids as a paraphyletic grade leading to traditional ornithischians, with Rewasaurus as a member of the Sulcimentisauria and the sister taxon to Diodorus. A cladogram adapted from the latter analysis is shown below:

- Dinosauria
  - Saurischia
  - Ornithischia
    - - Saltopus
      - Lewisuchus
    - - Itaguyra
      - Soumyasaurus
      - - Asilisaurus
        - Sulcimentisauria
          - Gamatavus
          - - Gondwanax
            - - Amanasaurus
              - - Tiki Fm. femora (IITKGPR1204, 1206)
                - - - Diodorus
                    - Rewasaurus
                  - - Technosaurus
                    - Parapredentata
                      - - Ignotosaurus
                        - Silesaurus
                      - - Dockum silesaurid
                        - - - Sacisaurus
                            - - Lutungutali
                              - Kwanasaurus
                          - - Eucoelophysis
                            - - Pisanosaurus
                              - - Laquintasaura
                                - Prionodontia ("traditional" Ornithischia)

== Paleoecology ==
Rewasaurus is known from Late Triassic Tiki Formation, which is the part of Rewa Basin of central India. The climate during which the Tiki Formation was deposited is suggested to be semi-arid with seasonal floodplains and rainfall, based on palaeosols. The formation also has reports of numerous vertebrates like phytosaurs (such as Volcanosuchus, Parasuchus, and Colossosuchus), dinosaurs (such as indeterminate sauropodomorphs, theropods, and herrerasaurs), rhynchosaurs like Hyperodapedon, pseudosuchians like Tikisuchus, indeterminate remains belonging to these clades, and various other reptiles, cynodonts, temnospondyls, cartilaginous fish, and ray-finned fishes.
