= Itaguyra =

Itaguyra Temporal range: Upper Triassic, Carnian

Scientific classification
- Kingdom: Animalia
- Phylum: Chordata
- Class: Reptilia
- Clade: Dinosauria (?)
- Clade: †Ornithischia (?)
- Family: †Silesauridae
- Genus: †Itaguyra; Paes Neto et al., 2025
- Species: †I. occulta

Binomial name
- †Itaguyra occulta Paes Neto et al., 2025

Genus of silesaurid dinosauromorphs

Itaguyra (meaning "stone bird") is an extinct genus of dinosauromorphs allied with taxa traditionally regarded as "silesaurids" (possibly the earliest ornithischian dinosaurs). It is known from the Late Triassic (Carnian age) Santa Cruz Sequence of the Santa Maria Supersequence of Brazil. The genus contains a single species, Itaguyra occulta, known from two isolated pelvic bones.

== Discovery and naming ==
Itaguyra type locality in Rio Grande do Sul, Brazil

The Itaguyra fossil material, two partial pelvic bones, was found in the 'Schoenstatt Sanctuary fossil site', representing outcrops of the Santacruzodon Assemblage Zone of the Santa Cruz Sequence of the Santa Maria Supersequence in Rio Grande do Sul, Brazil. The bones were found and collected mixed with the remains of cynodont therapsids. In a 2024 publication, Battista et al. reported this specimen as a new indeterminate archosauriform.

In 2025, Paes Neto and colleagues recognized the "silesaurid" affinities of the specimens and described them as a belonging to a new genus and species. They established UFRGS-PV-1365(a)-T, is a partial left ilium, as the holotype specimen. An associated partial ischium, UFRGS-PV-1365(b)-T, was referred as a paratype. The generic name, Itaguyra, combines the Tupi words ita, meaning "stone", and guyra, meaning "bird", referring to its avemetatarsalian (lit. 'bird feet') classification. The specific name, occulta, is Latin for "hidden", referring to the specimens' discovery alongside bones of cynodonts.

== Classification ==
In their phylogenetic analysis, Paes Neto et al. (2025) found Itaguyra to be a basal, non-prionodontian, member of the Ornithischia. Similar to a number of recent studies, these taxa, along with other "traditional silesaurids", were recovered as a paraphyletic grade of ornithischians. These results are displayed in the cladogram below:

- Dinosauria
  - Saurischia
  - Ornithischia
    - - Saltopus
      - Lewisuchus
    - - Itaguyra
      - - Asilisaurus
        - Sulcimentisauria
          - Gamatavus
          - - Gondwanax
            - - Amanasaurus
              - - Diodorus
                - - Technosaurus
                  - Parapredentata
                    - - Ignotosaurus
                      - Silesaurus
                    - - - Sacisaurus
                        - - Lutungutali
                          - Kwanasaurus
                      - - Eucoelophysis
                        - - Pisanosaurus
                          - - Laquintasaura
                            - Prionodontia

== Paleoenvironment ==
Itaguyra was found in sediments likely belonging to the Santacruzodon Assemblage Zone of the Santa Maria Supersequence. Other fauna from this assemblage include dicynodonts, different groups of cynodonts, paracrocodylomorphs, proterochampsids, rhynchosaurs, and procolophonoids.
