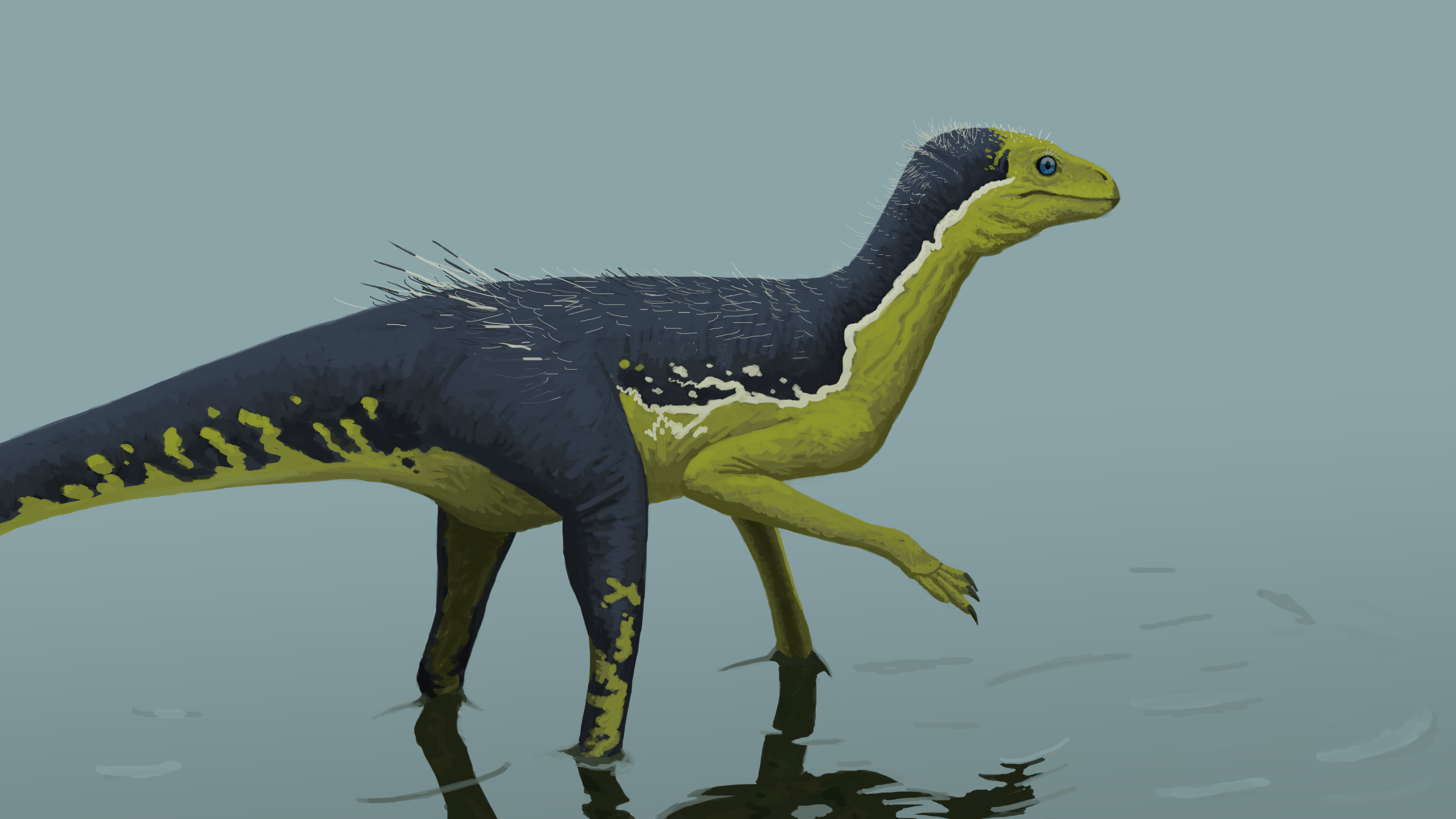
- Speculative life restoration

Scientific classification
- Kingdom: Animalia
- Phylum: Chordata
- Class: Reptilia
- Clade: Dinosauria (?)
- Clade: †Ornithischia (?)
- Family: †Silesauridae
- Clade: †Sulcimentisauria
- Genus: †Gondwanax; Müller, 2025
- Species: †G. paraisensis

Binomial name
- †Gondwanax paraisensis Müller, 2025

= Gondwanax =

Gondwanax Temporal range: Middle–Upper Triassic, Ladinian–early Carnian

Genus of silesaurid dinosauromorphs

Gondwanax (meaning "lord of Gondwana") is an extinct genus of silesaurid dinosauriform from the Triassic Pinheiros-Chiniquá Sequence of Brazil. The genus contains a single species, G. paraisensis, known from a partial skeleton. Gondwanax represents one of the oldest known dinosauromorphs, and, alongside the roughly coeval Gamatavus, one of the oldest South American silesaurs. While the possession of two sacral vertebrae characterizes more basal "silesaurid" taxa, Gondwanax has three—the oldest occurrence of this trait in the fossil record.

== Discovery and naming ==
Gondwanax type locality in Rio Grande do Sul, Brazil

The Gondwanax fossil material was discovered in 2014 by physician and paleontology enthusiast Pedro L. P. Aurelio at the "Linha Várzea 2" ("Becker") site, belonging to the Pinheiros-Chiniquá Sequence of the Santa Maria Supersequence (Formation) in Paraíso do Sul municipality of Rio Grande do Sul, Brazil. These layers are representative of the Dinodontosaurus Assemblage Zone. He subsequently donated it to a university for study in 2021. The holotype specimen, CAPPA/UFSM 0417, is a single right femur. Several other partially disarticulated bones were found in association with this specimen. While no overlapping bones suggest the presence of multiple individuals, this possibility has not been ruled out as the bones were not found in perfect articulation. The additional material comprises two cervical, several dorsal, three sacral, and at least three caudal vertebrae, and a partial pelvic girdle.

In 2024, Rodrigo Temp Müller announced Gondwanax paraisensis as a new genus and species of silesaurids based on these fossil remains. The generic name, Gondwanax, combines Gondwana—the name of an ancient 'supercontinent' containing South America—with the Ancient Greek ἄναξ, meaning "lord" or "king", in reference to the preeminence of dinosauromorphs throughout the Mesozoic Era. The specific name, paraisensis, references the municipality of Paraíso do Sul, where the specimens were found. The final version of the publication describing Gondwanax paraisensis was published the following year.

Having been found in rocks belonging to the Ladinian–Carnian, Gondwanax is notable as it is one of the oldest known dinosauromorphs. Gamatavus, another 'silesaurid' from the same locality, and Gondwanax together represent the oldest South American 'silesaurs'.

== Description ==
The fossil material of Gondwanax indicates a body length of about 1 metre (3.3 ft). The basalmost 'silesaurids' are characterized by only two sacral vertebrae. However, Gondwanax is the oldest fossil dinosauromorph that has three sacral vertebrae.

== Classification ==
In his phylogenetic analysis, Müller (2025) recovered Gondwanax as a basal member of the Sulcimentisauria. Similar to a number of recent studies, these taxa, along with other "traditional" silesaurids, are treated as a paraphyletic grade of ornithischians. These results are displayed in the cladogram below:

- Dinosauria
  - Saurischia
  - Ornithischia
    - - Saltopus
      - Lewisuchus
    - - Soumyasaurus
      - - Asilisaurus
        - Sulcimentisauria
          - Gamatavus
          - - Gondwanax
            - - Amanasaurus
              - - Diodorus
                - - Technosaurus
                  - Parapredentata
                    - - Ignotosaurus
                      - Silesaurus
                    - - - Sacisaurus
                        - - Lutungutali
                          - Kwanasaurus
                      - - Eucoelophysis
                        - - Pisanosaurus
                          - - Laquintasaura
                            - Prionodontia

== Paleoenvironment ==
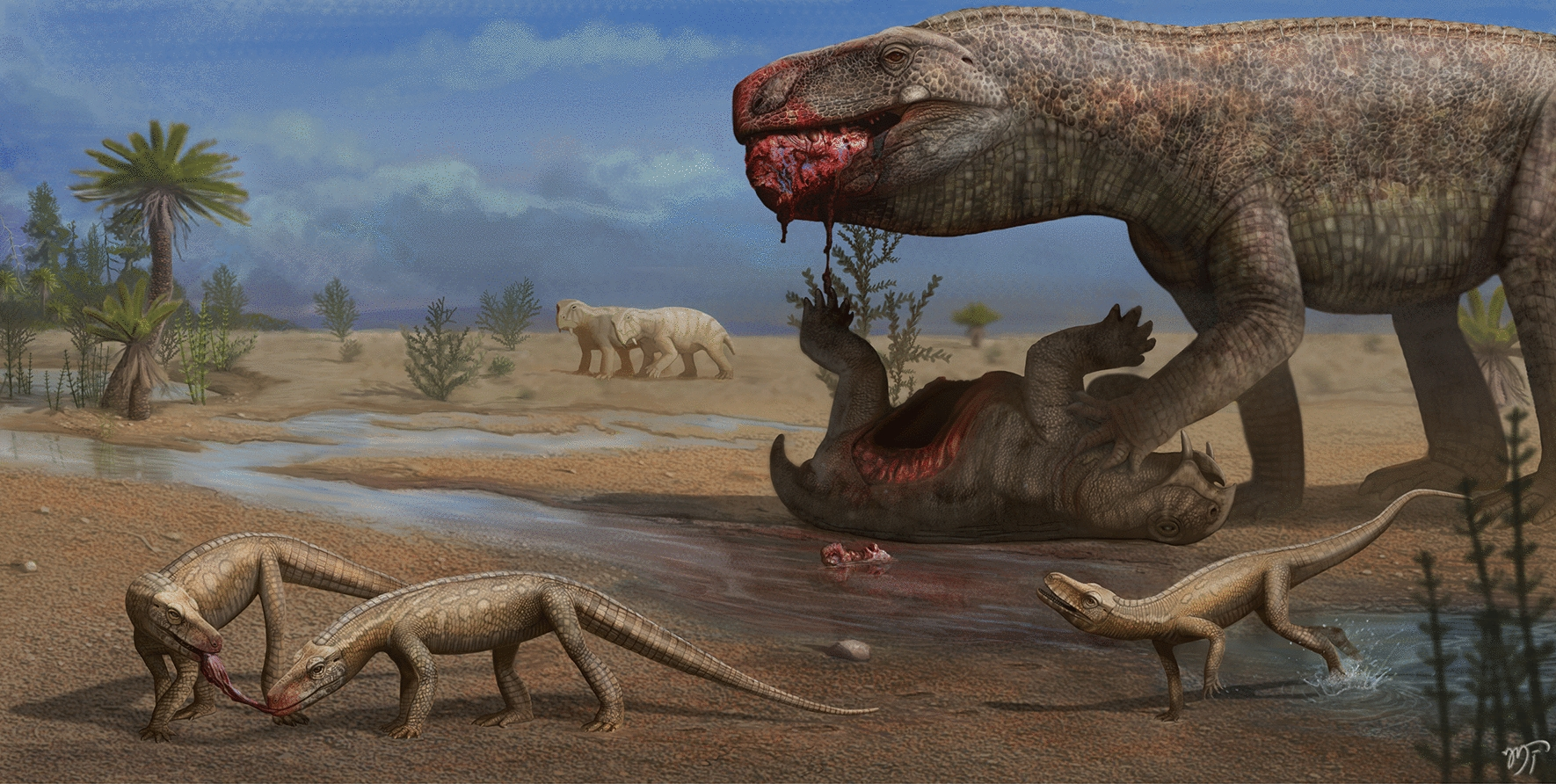
Life restoration of Parvosuchus and Prestosuchus (feeding on a dicynodont) in a Dinodontosaurus AZ environment

Gondwanax was found in the "Linha Várzea 2" site of the Dinodontosaurus Assemblage Zone (AZ) of the Santa Maria Formation. The gracilisuchid Parvosuchus was also found in this site. The roughly coeval "Picada do Gama" site has yielded a closely related "silesaurid", Gamatavus. Other localities indicate that these animals likely shared an ecosystem with dicynodonts, cynodonts, pseudosuchians, aphanosaurs, rhynchosaurs, and procolophonoids.

The Brazilian Dinodontosaurus Assemblage Zone shares many faunal similarities with the Argentinian Tarjadia Assemblage Zone, the dinosauromorph-bearing units of the Tanzanian Lifua Member, and the Zambian Ntawere Formation, potentially indicating that these units belong to similar temporal ranges.
