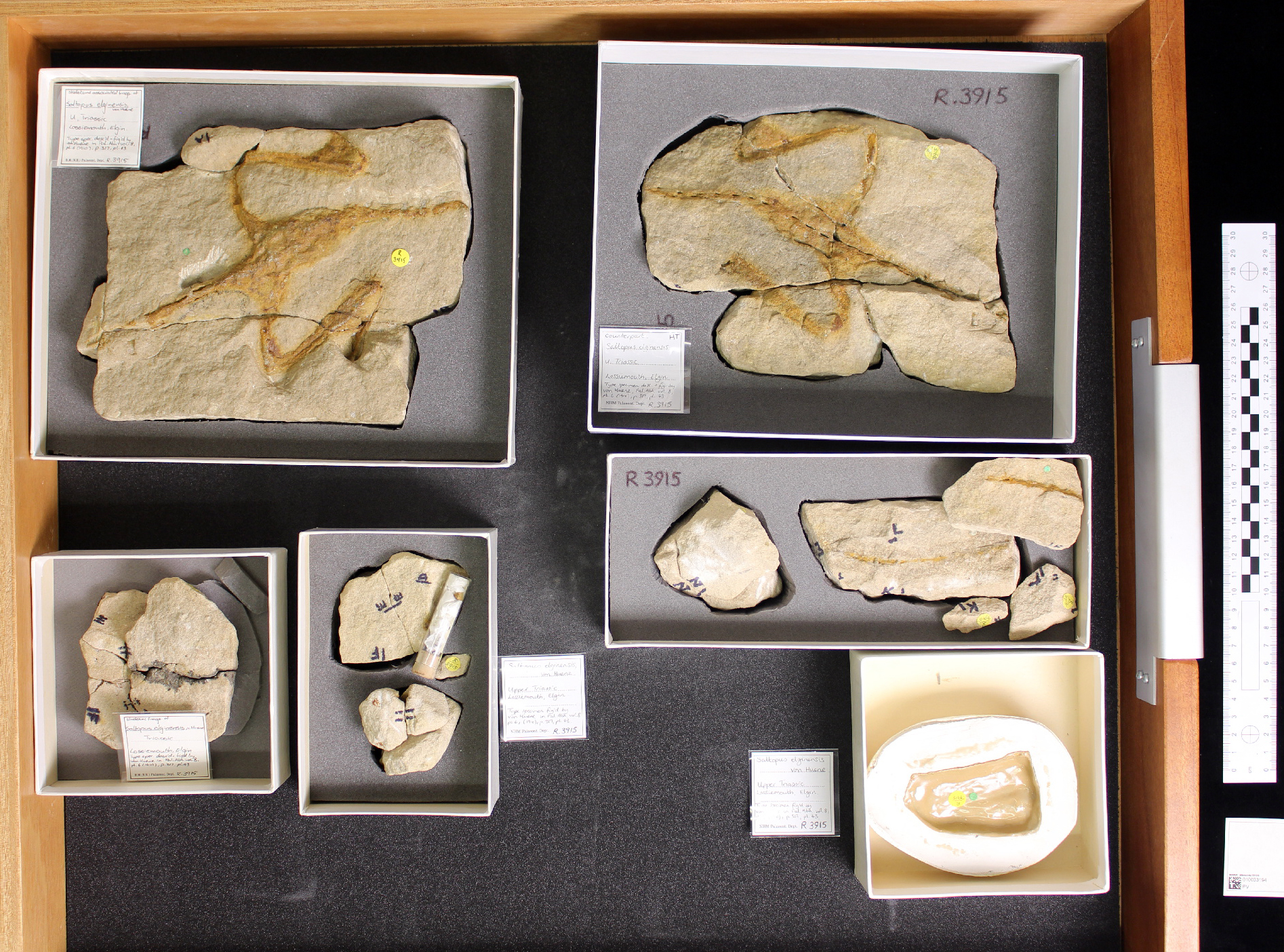
- The Holotype specimen, NHMUK PV R 3915, in the collections of the Natural History Museum, London.

Scientific classification
- Kingdom: Animalia
- Phylum: Chordata
- Class: Reptilia
- Clade: Dinosauromorpha
- Clade: Dinosauriformes
- Clade: Dracohors
- Genus: †Saltopus von Huene, 1910
- Species: †S. elginensis

Binomial name
- †Saltopus elginensis von Huene, 1910

= Saltopus =

Saltopus Temporal range: Late Triassic, 235–205 Ma

Extinct genus of reptiles

Saltopus ("hopping foot") is a genus of very small bipedal dinosauriform containing the single species Saltopus elginensis from the late Triassic period of Scotland. It is one of the most famous Elgin Reptiles.

== Description ==
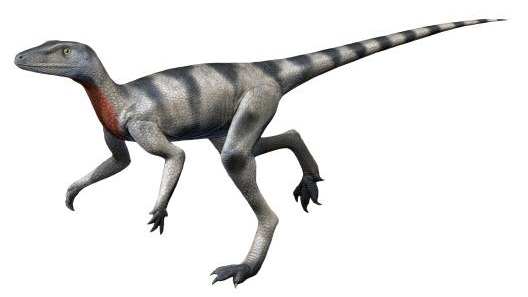
Life restoration

Saltopus elginensis is known only from a single partial skeleton lacking the skull, but including parts of the vertebral column, the forelimbs, the pelvis and the hindlimbs. These have been mainly preserved as impressions or natural casts in the sandstone; very little bone material is present. It was about the size of a domestic cat, and would have been roughly 80–100 centimetres (31–39 in) long. It had hollow bones like those of birds and other dinosaurs. It may have weighed around 1 kilogram (2.2 lb). In 2016, it was estimated to be 50 cm long, 15 cm high at the hips, and 110 g. Most of the length was accounted for by the tail. It had five-fingered hands, with the fourth and fifth finger reduced in size. Contrary to the original description, in 2011 it was established that the sacrum (hip vertebrae) was made up of two vertebrae, the primitive ancestral condition, not four.

== History ==
The only known fossil of Saltopus was discovered in 1867 by William Taylor in the Lossiemouth West & East Quarries. It was initially named as a specimen of Telerpeton elginense (now Leptopleuron lacertinum) by Thomas Henry Huxley in 1867, and it was later named and described by Friedrich von Huene in 1910 as the type species Saltopus elginensis.

The generic name is derived from Latin saltare, "to jump" and Greek πούς, pous, "foot". The specific name refers to its provenance near Elgin, which yields the Elgin Reptiles. The holotype, NHMUK PV R 3915, was excavated from the Lossiemouth Sandstone Formation, which dates from the Carnian-Norian stage.

== Classification ==
Saltopus has been variously identified as a saurischian (lizard-hipped) dinosaur, a more advanced theropod, and a close relative of the herrerasaurs, but its taxonomy has been in dispute because only fragmentary remains have been recovered. Some researchers, such as Gregory S. Paul, have suggested it may represent a juvenile specimen of a coelophysid theropod such as Coelophysis or Procompsognathus. Rauhut and Hungerbühler in 2000 concluded it is a primitive dinosauriform, not a true dinosaur, closely related to Lagosuchus. Michael Benton, continuing the studies of the late Alick Walker redescribing the fossil in 2011, found it to be a dinosauriform more derived than Lagosuchus.

A large phylogenetic analysis of early dinosaurs and dinosauromorphs by Matthew Baron, David B. Norman and Paul Barrett (2017) recovered Saltopus near the base of the dinosaur lineage, suggesting that it may represent the closest relative of true dinosaurs.

In 2025, phylogenetic studies on silesaurids, including those of new taxa like Itaguyra, have shown an alternative classification for Saltopus, finding it as the most basal ornithischian together with Lewisuchus, and that silesaurids are a paraphyletic grade within Ornithischia.

Below is a cladogram from the description of Itaguyra.

- Dinosauria
  - Saurischia
  - Ornithischia
    - - Saltopus
      - Lewisuchus
    - - Itaguyra
      - - Asilisaurus
        - Sulcimentisauria
          - Gamatavus
          - - Gondwanax
            - - Amanasaurus
              - - Diodorus
                - - Technosaurus
                  - Parapredentata
                    - - Ignotosaurus
                      - Silesaurus
                    - - - Sacisaurus
                        - - Lutungutali
                          - Kwanasaurus
                      - - Eucoelophysis
                        - - Pisanosaurus
                          - - Laquintasaura
                            - Prionodontia
