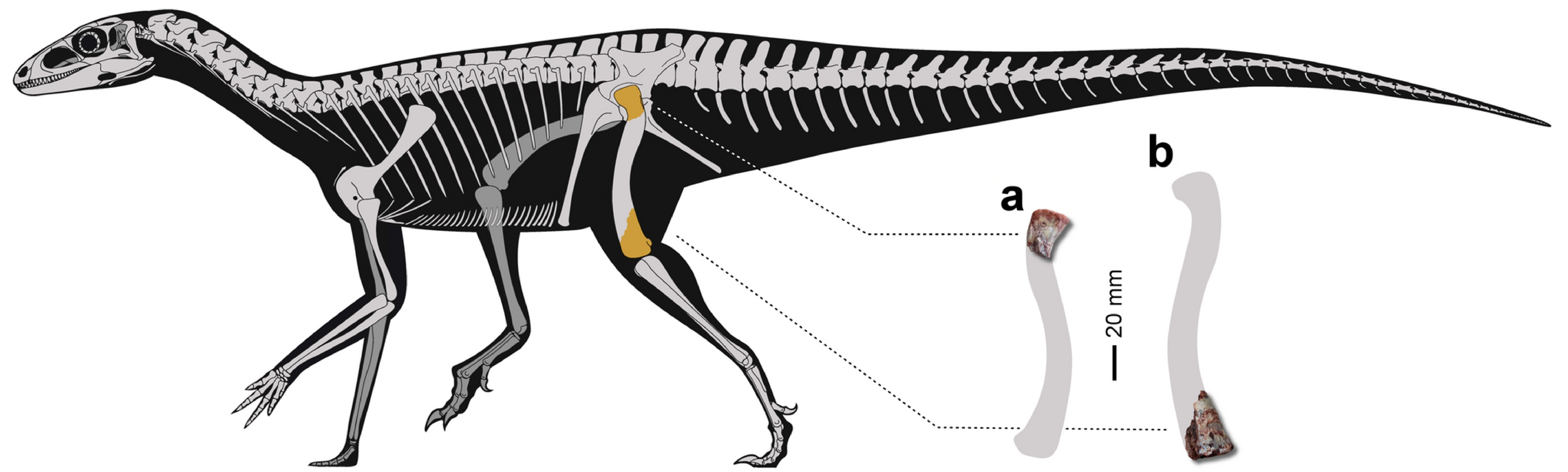
- Skeletal reconstruction showing known fossil material

Scientific classification
- Kingdom: Animalia
- Phylum: Chordata
- Clade: Dinosauria (?)
- Clade: †Ornithischia (?)
- Family: †Silesauridae
- Genus: †Amanasaurus; Müller & Garcia, 2024
- Species: †A. nesbitti

Binomial name
- †Amanasaurus nesbitti Müller & Garcia, 2024

= Amanasaurus =

Amanasaurus Temporal range: Late Triassic (Carnian), ~233.23 Ma

Extinct genus of silesaurid dinosauromorphs

Amanasaurus (meaning "rain lizard") is a genus of silesaurid dinosauriforms from the Late Triassic Santa Maria Supersequence of Rio Grande do Sul, Brazil. The genus contains a single species, A. nesbitti, known from two partial femora.

== Discovery and naming ==
Amanasaurus type locality in Rio Grande do Sul, Brazil

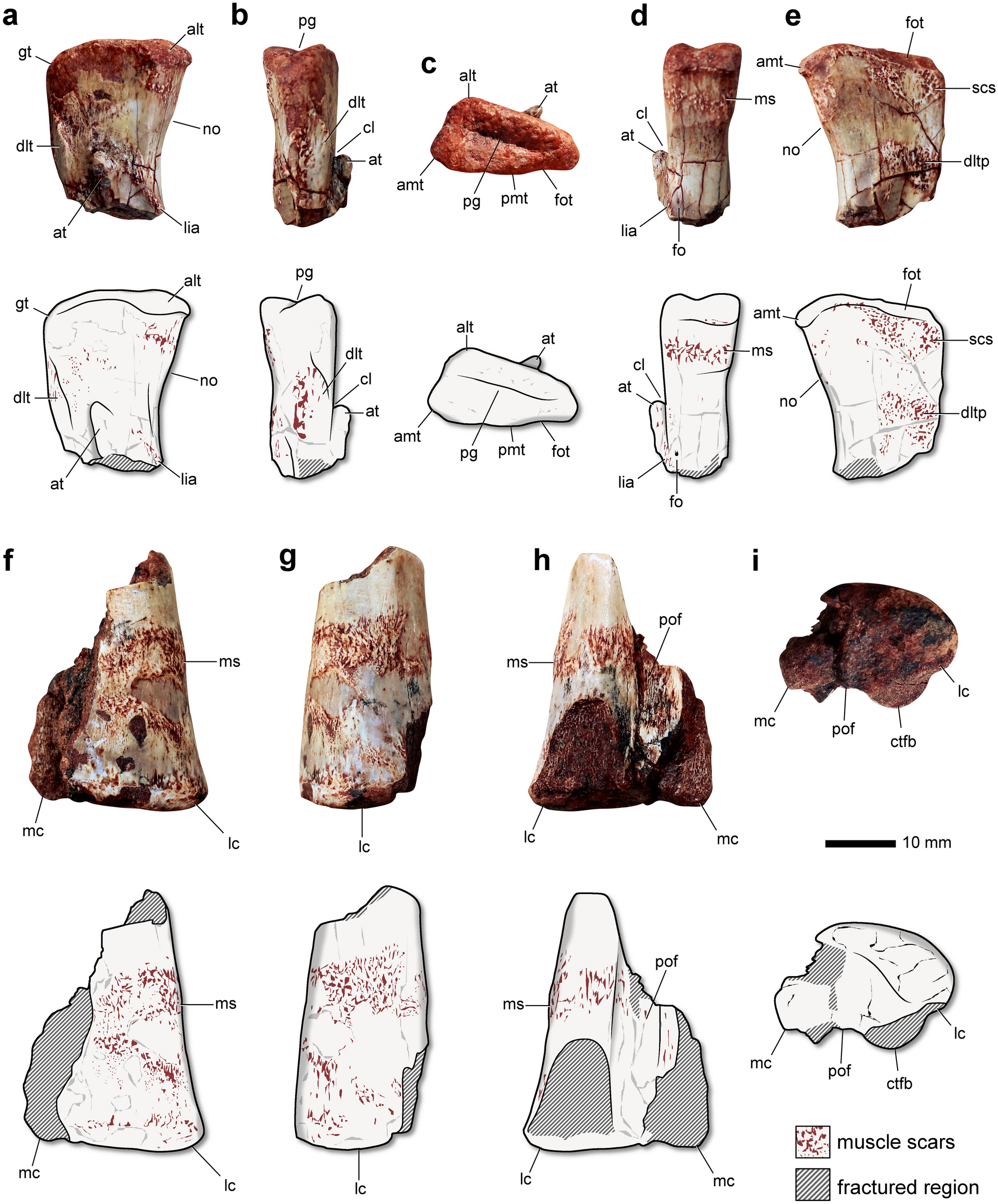
Amanasaurus holotype (a–e) and referred specimen (f–i)

The Amanasaurus holotype specimen, CAPPA/UFSM 0374, was discovered in the Hyperodapedon Assemblage Zone of the Santa Maria Supersequence (Candelária Sequence) of the Paraná Basin, dated to the late Carnian stage of the Late Triassic. It consists of a proximal right femur. CAPPA/UFSM 0375, a distal left femur belonging to a larger individual from the same locality, was also referred to Amanasaurus.

In 2023, Müller & Garcia announced Amanasaurus nesbitti as a new genus and species of silesaurid based on these remains. The generic name, "Amanasaurus", combines the Tupi word "amana", meaning "rain", with the Greek "saurus", meaning "lizard", in reference to the Carnian pluvial episode. The specific name, "nesbitti", honors North American paleontologist Sterling J. Nesbitt.

The original publication describing Amanasaurus nesbitti did not fulfill the requirements of the ICZN. As such, Müller & Garcia published a correction the following year, finalizing the taxon name.

== Classification ==
Müller & Garcia (2023) recovered Amanasaurus as the sister taxon to Ignotosaurus and Silesaurus. Similar to a number of recent studies, these taxa, along with other "traditional" silesaurids, are treated as a paraphyletic grade of ornithischians. The results of their phylogenetic analyses are shown in the cladogram below:

- Dinosauria
  - Saurischia
  - Ornithischia
    - - Saltopus
      - Lewisuchus
    - - Soumyasaurus
      - - Asilisaurus
        - Sulcimentisauria
          - Gamatavus
          - - Diodorus
            - - Lutungutali
              - Technosaurus
              - Kwanasaurus
              - - Sacisaurus
                - Parapredentata
                  - Silesauridae
                    - Amanasaurus
                    - Ignotosaurus
                    - Silesaurus
                  - - Eucoelophysis
                  - - Pisanosaurus
                    - - - Laquintasaura
                        - Prionodontia
