= Gamatavus =

Gamatavus Temporal range: Middle Triassic, (Ladinian–early Carnian)

Scientific classification
- Kingdom: Animalia
- Phylum: Chordata
- Class: Reptilia
- Clade: Dinosauria (?)
- Clade: †Ornithischia (?)
- Family: †Silesauridae
- Genus: †Gamatavus; Pretto et al., 2022
- Species: †G. antiquus

Binomial name
- †Gamatavus antiquus Pretto et al., 2022
- Gamatavus type locality in Dilermando de Aguiar Municipality, Brazil

Extinct genus of silesaurid dinosauromorphs

Gamatavus (meaning "Picada do Gama great-grandfather") is a genus of silesaurid dinosauriform from the Middle Triassic Santa Maria Formation of Dilermando de Aguiar Municipality, Brazil. The genus contains a single species, G. antiquus, known from a partial ilium. Gamatavus represents one of the oldest silesaurids known from South America, alongside the roughly coeval Gondwanax.

== Discovery and naming ==
The Gamatavus holotype specimen, UFSM 11348a, was discovered in the Dinodontosaurus Assemblage Zone of the Santa Maria Formation ('Picada do Gama' site), dated to the Ladinian–early Carnian stages of the Middle Triassic. It consists of a partial right ilium. A partial left femur and four incomplete vertebrae were found in association with the holotype, but they were not assigned to Gamatavus.

In 2022, Pretto et al. described Gamatavus antiquus as a new genus and species of silesaurid based on these remains. The generic name, "Gamatavus", combines a reference to the type locality (Picada do Gama site) with the Latin word "atavus", meaning "great-grandfather". The specific name, "antiquus", is derived from a Latin word meaning "ancient".

== Classification ==
Pretto et al. (2022) tested the phylogenetic relationships of Gamatavus in the datasets of Ezcurra et al. (2020) and Müller and Garcia (2020), both of which show alternate positions for silesaurids — the former as non-dinosaurian dinosauromorphs, and the latter as early ornithischian dinosaurs. Their results are shown in the cladograms below.

Topology 1: Ezcurra et al. (2020) dataset

- Dinosauromorpha
  - Lagosuchus
  - - Silesauridae
      - Lutungutali
      - Lewisuchus
      - - Silesaurus
        - - Asilisaurus
          - Gamatavus
    - Dinosauria
      - Ornithischia
      - Saurischia

Topology 2: Müller and Garcia (2020) dataset

- Dinosauromorpha
  - Lagosuchus
  - Dinosauria
    - Ornithischia
      - Lewisuchus
      - - Asilisaurus
        - Soumyasaurus
        - Technosaurus
        - Sacisaurus
        - Diodorus
        - Gamatavus
        - - Lutungutali
          - Kwanasaurus
        - - Ignotosaurus
          - Silesaurus
        - - Eucoelophysis
          - - Pisanosaurus
            - core Ornithischia
    - Saurischia

== Paleoenvironment ==
The Gamatavus holotype was found in the Dinodontosaurus Assemblage Zone of the Santa Maria Formation. It coexisted with dicynodonts, cynognathians, probainognathians, pseudosuchians, aphanosaurs, rhynchosaurs, and procolophonoids. The Brazilian Dinodontosaurus Assemblage Zone shares many faunal similarities with the Argentinian Tarjadia Assemblage Zone, the dinosauromorph-bearing units of the Tanzanian Lifua Member, and the Zambian Ntawere Formation, potentially indicating that these units belong to the same temporal range.
