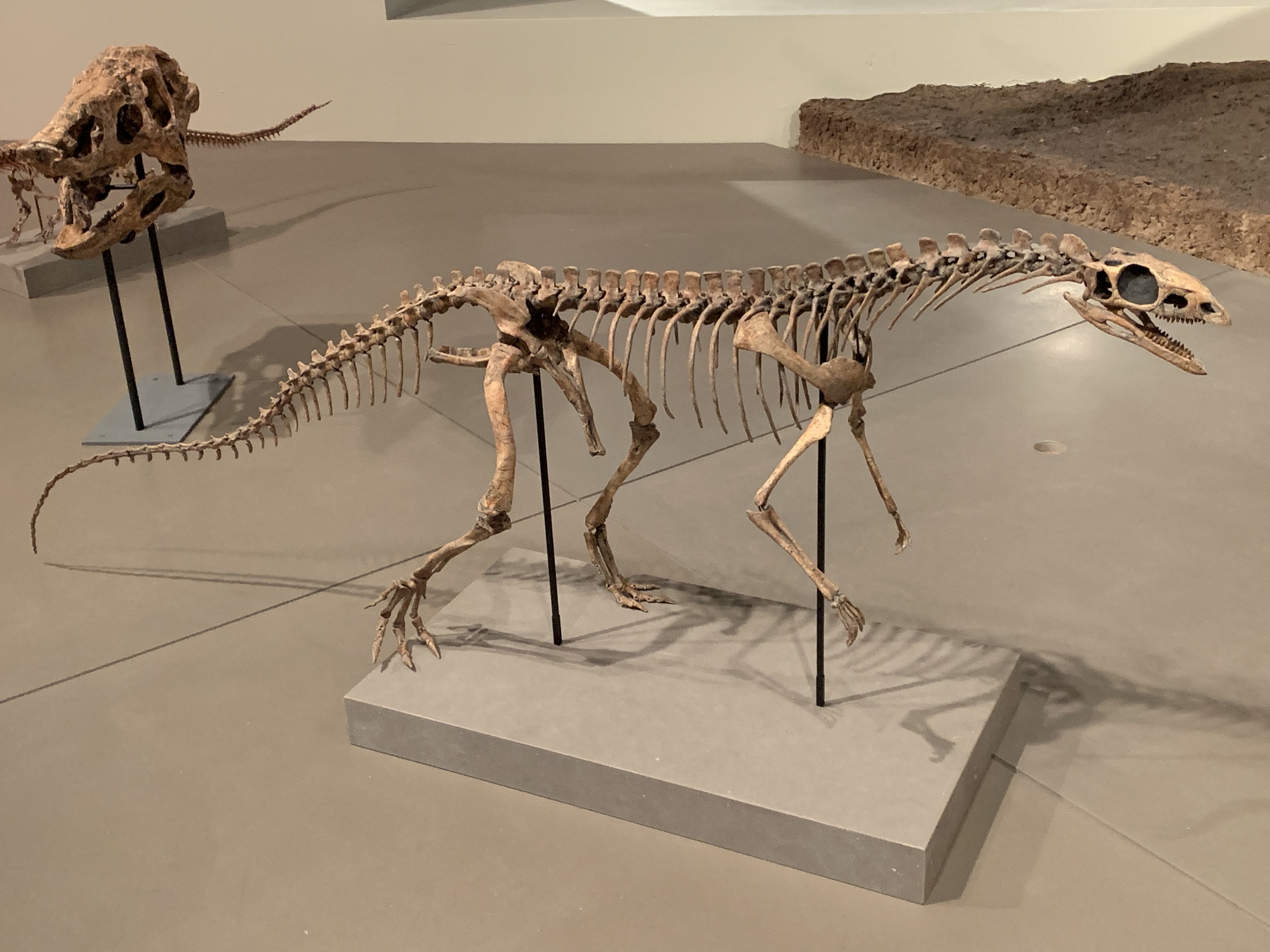
- Reconstructed replica skeleton of Asilisaurus, a small early silesaurid

Scientific classification
- Kingdom: Animalia
- Phylum: Chordata
- Class: Reptilia
- Clade: Archosauria
- Clade: Avemetatarsalia
- Clade: Ornithodira
- Clade: Dinosauromorpha
- Clade: Dinosauria (?)
- Clade: †Ornithischia (?)
- Family: †Silesauridae; Langer et al., 2010

Subgroups
- Agnosphitys?; Asilisaurus; Itaguyra; Lewisuchus?; Soumyasaurus; Sulcimentisauria Martz & Small, 2019; Diodorus; Gamatavus; Gondwanax; Rewasaurus?; Technosaurus; Parapredentata Norman et al., 2022; Amanasaurus?; Eucoelophysis; Ignotosaurus?; Kwanasaurus; Lutungutali?; Pisanosaurus?; Sacisaurus; Silesaurus; "Traditional" Ornithischia? (Saphornithischia / Prionodontia)

= Silesauridae =

Silesaurids Temporal range: Middle Triassic? – Late Triassic (245?–202 Ma) Possible descendant taxon Saphornithischia survives to the Late Cretaceous

Extinct family of dinosaur-like reptiles

Silesauridae is an extinct family of early dinosauriforms which lived during the Triassic Period. Their fossils have been found in Europe, North America, South America, Africa, and India, reaching their widest distribution and diversity early in the Late Triassic. The exact affinities of silesaurids are debated, and various studies come to different conclusions regarding the relationship between silesaurids and early dinosaurs.

Some studies regard silesaurids as a clade of non-dinosaur dinosauriforms, as well as the sister group of dinosaurs. In other words, all silesaurid species originated from a single common ancestor which evolved adjacent to, but not within, the group Dinosauria.

Other studies argue that most or all silesaurids (a.k.a. "silesaurs") belong within Dinosauria, specifically as long-sought Triassic representatives of the ornithischian dinosaurs. A few silesaurs may still comprise an exclusive clade within Ornithischia, but most correspond to a paraphyletic grade (a series of species increasingly close to Jurassic-Cretaceous "traditional" ornithischians).

Most silesaurid species are based on fragmentary fossils, but a few are known from partial skeletons. They have a consistent lightly-built body plan, with a fairly long neck and legs. Their forelimbs are notably long and slender compared to other Triassic dinosauriforms, so many silesaurids may have been primarily quadrupedal. Silesaurids occupied a variety of ecological niches. Early examples such as Lewisuchus were small carnivores with knife-shaped teeth. Many later taxa (such as Kwanasaurus) were specialized herbivores with leaf-shaped teeth and a beak at the tip of the lower jaw. As indicated by the contents of referred coprolites, Silesaurus may have been insectivorous, feeding selectively on small beetles and other arthropods.

== Description ==
=== Size ===
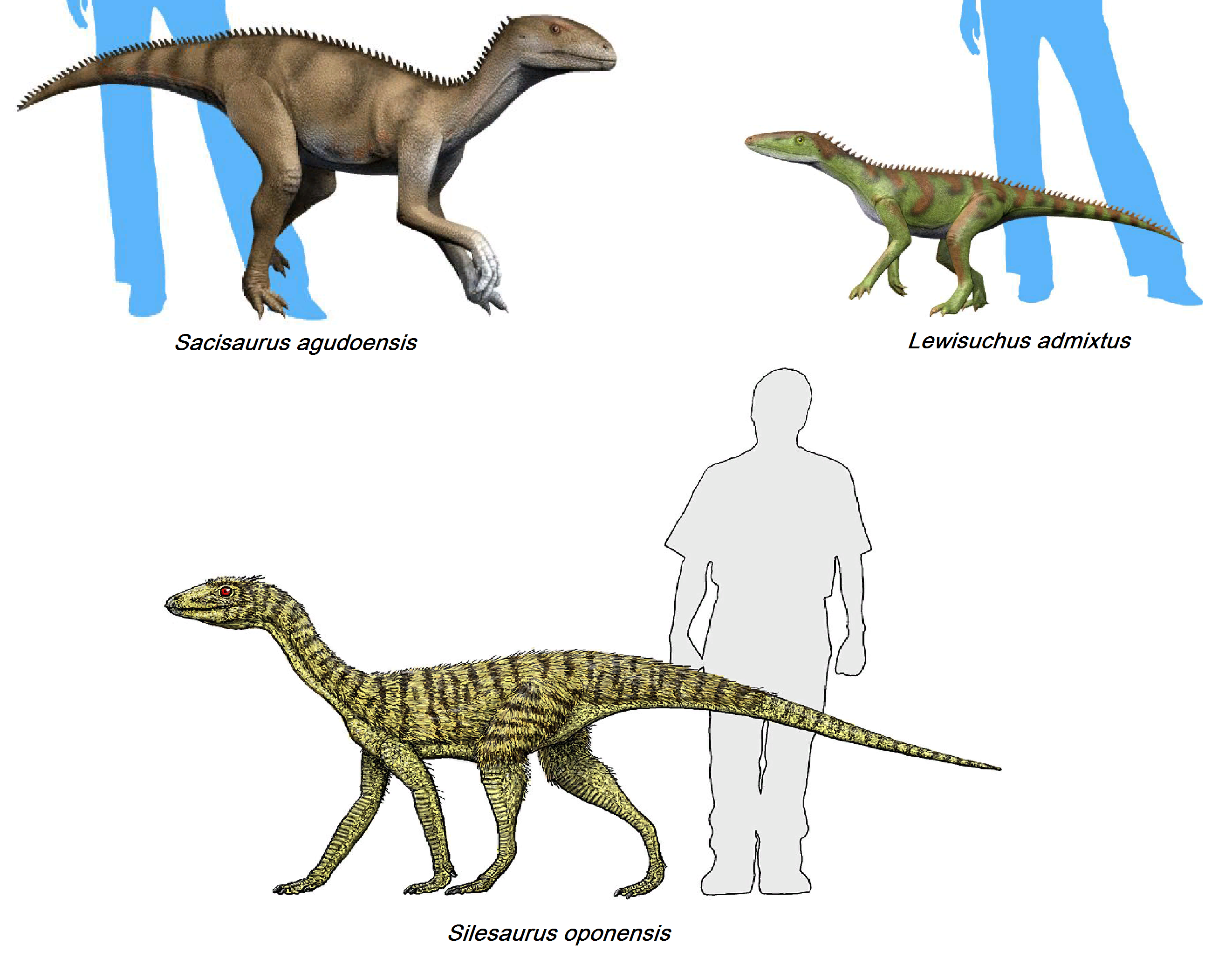
Life restorations of Sacisaurus, Lewisuchus, and Silesaurus, with human silhouettes for scale.

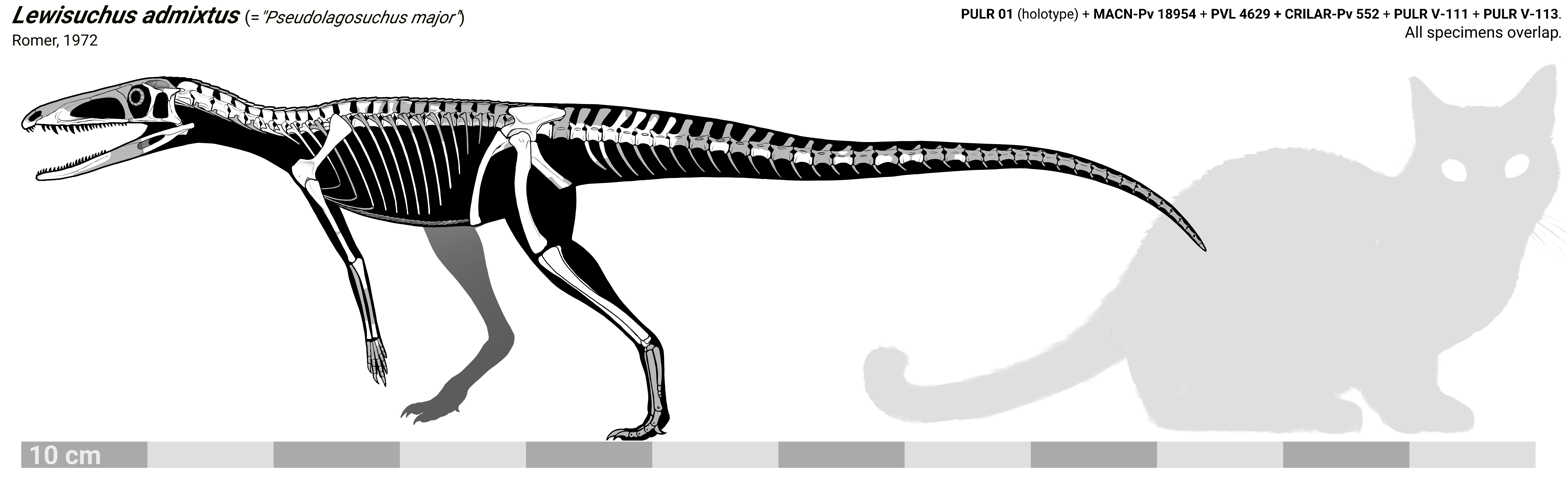
Skeletal reconstruction of Lewisuchus admixtus

In general, silesaurids were small compared to most Jurassic and Cretaceous dinosaurs. Silesaurus opolensis, a species with well-understood skeletal anatomy, could reach a total length of around 2.1–2.3 m (6.9–7.5 ft). Considering indeterminate fossils, some silesaurids were the largest dinosauriforms of their time. Isolated femur bones from Tanzania and Zambia belong to silesaurids up to 3.5 m (11 ft) in length. These African fossils were very early in dinosauriform evolution, from the Middle Triassic or the early Carnian stage (earliest Late Triassic). The largest silesaurid fossils from South America are also Middle Triassic in age.

By the late Carnian, the carnivorous dinosaur Herrerasaurus reached a similar size, and theropod and sauropodomorph dinosaurs achieved even greater sizes later on in the Late Triassic. Early Jurassic ornithischians were smaller than most silesaurids, hinting at a miniaturization event across the Triassic–Jurassic mass extinction.

=== Skull and teeth ===
In many regards, silesaurid skulls are similar to early dinosaurs and other archosaurs. All Triassic archosaurs have weight-saving holes on the snout (the antorbital fenestra), the jaw (mandibular fenestra), and the back of the skull (the upper and lower temporal fenestrae). Most unique qualities of silesaurid skulls relate to the areas adapted for processing food.

The skull of Lewisuchus is the most generalized among silesaurids. The snout is slender, with a long series of narrow, recurved teeth bearing fine serrations and a sharp tip. Teeth with this ziphodont (knife-like) shape are adapted for rending flesh. A ziphodont tooth shape was the standard ancestral condition for archosauriforms, including many theropod dinosaurs.

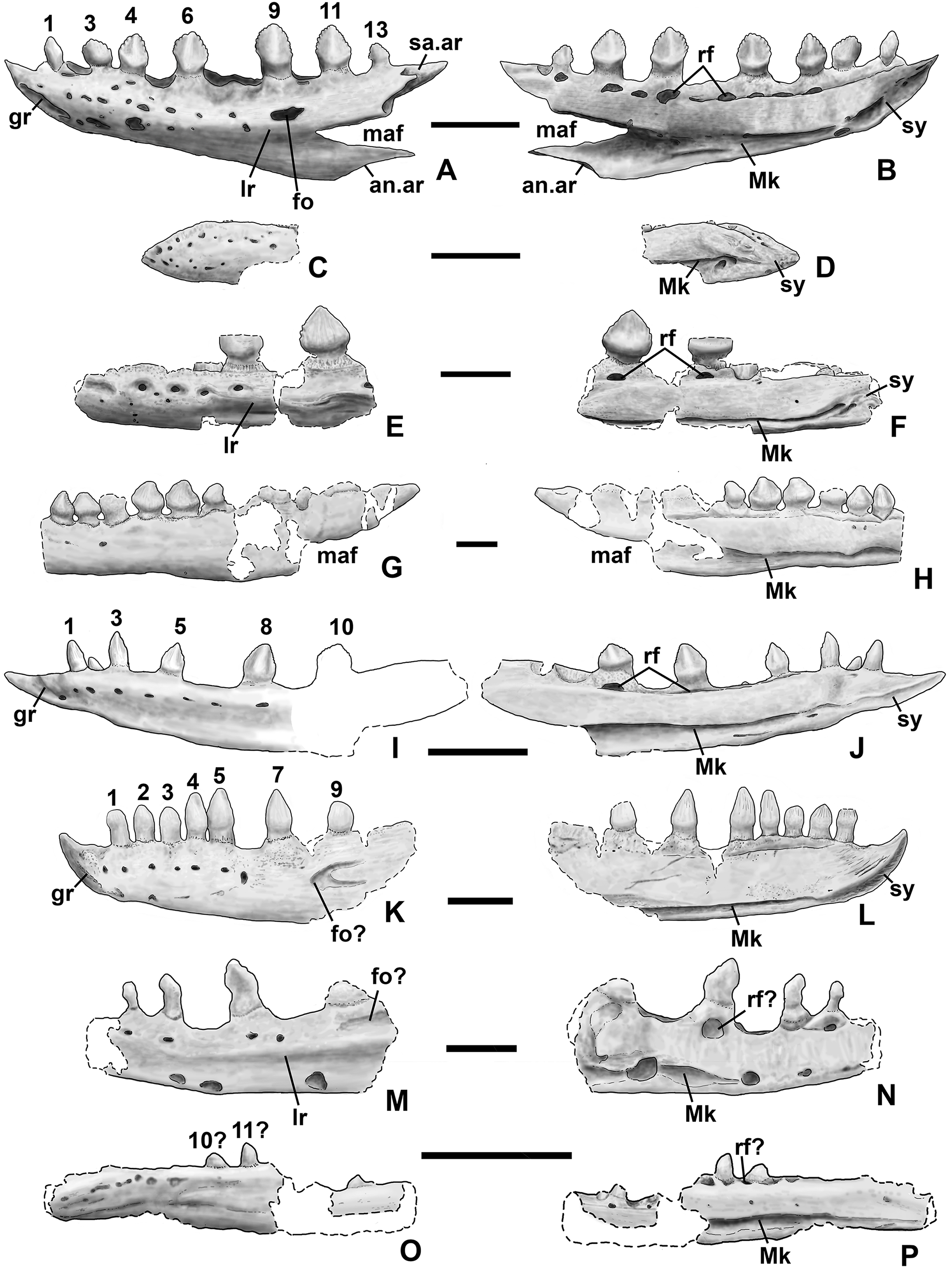
Dentaries (toothed lower jaw bones) from eight silesaurid species. From top to bottom: Kwanasaurus, Asilisaurus, Eucoelophysis, Technosaurus, Sacisaurus, Silesaurus, Diodorus and Soumyasaurus. Seen in lateral (external) view on the left and medial (internal) view on the right.

Other silesaurids modify the skull by losing teeth at the tip of the jaw. In Asilisaurus, the front of the lower jaw bends down, while in advanced silesaurids the jaw curves upwards into a pointed tip. Despite a few early reports to the contrary, silesaurids do not have a predentary, a toothless bone at the tip of the lower jaw, unique to "traditional" ornithischians. Regardless, the front of the jaw is covered with sensory pits, and in life it was probably sheathed by a keratinous beak in both groups. The meckelian groove, a furrow along the inner surface of the lower jaw, shifts to a lower position in sulcimentisaurian silesaurids.

Apart from Lewisuchus, silesaurid teeth trend towards greater specialization for herbivory. The teeth are low and peg-like in Asilisaurus and Silesaurus. In later silesaurids they become leaf-shaped, with large rounded serrations and a crown which widens from front-to-back at its base. In the most specialized silesaurids, such as Kwanasaurus, the base also expands in a side-to-side dimension. By that stage, the teeth are almost identical to Early Jurassic ornithischians such as Lesothosaurus and Scelidosaurus. They also resemble a few entirely unrelated archosaurs, such as Revueltosaurus. Silesaurid teeth are ankylothecodont, meaning that they are set in deep sockets (thecodonty) and the ligaments within each socket eventually harden into bone (ankylosis). Though ankylothecodont teeth are widespread among Triassic reptiles, this type of tooth implantation never occurs in "traditional" ornithischians.

=== Shoulder and forelimb ===
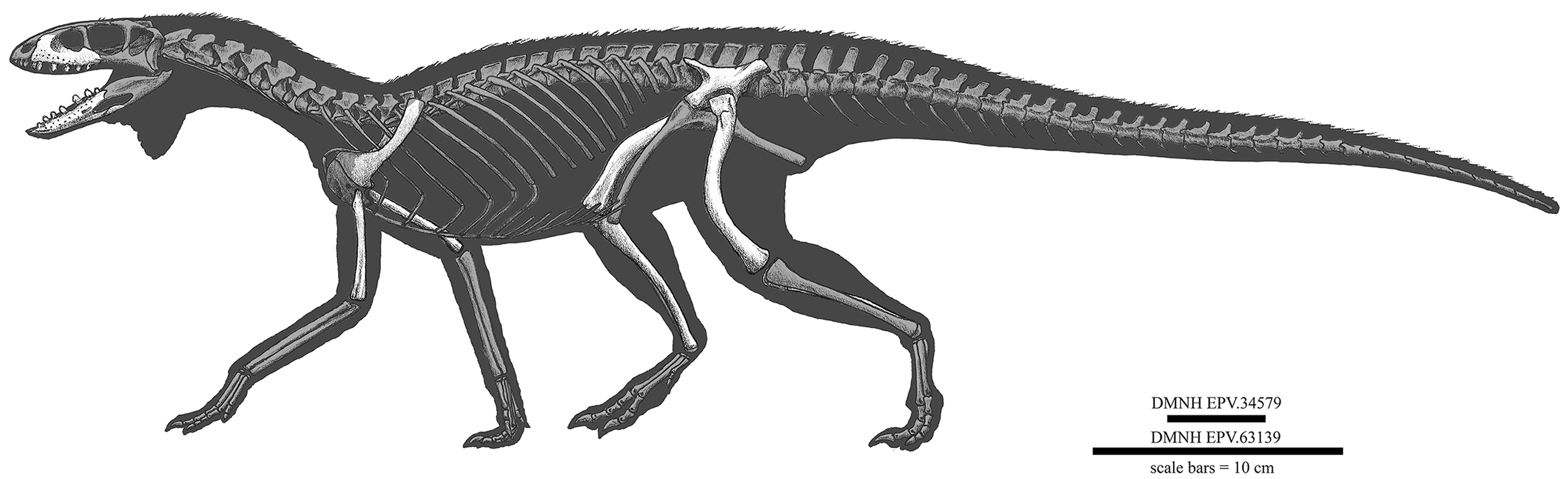
A skeletal diagram of Kwanasaurus, showing preserved bones.

Silesaurids are unusual in the sheer length of their forelimbs, which are equally as long as the hindlimbs in well-preserved taxa such as Silesaurus and Asilisaurus. This has led many paleontologists to conclude that silesaurids spent most of their time on all fours, a quadrupedal stance. In contrast, all theropods were certainly bipedal (walking on only their hindlimbs), which was also the case for herrerasaurians, early sauropodomorphs, and the early dinosauriform Lagosuchus. Ornithischians were traditionally assumed to have a bipedal ancestor, since many small Jurassic representatives were bipeds with short forelimbs. If silesaurids are Triassic ornithischians, they hint at a more complex series of shifts between bipedal and quadrupedal mobility over the course of ornithischian evolution. It is possible that some silesaurids could have adopted a bipedal posture in rare circumstances (such as when fleeing a predator), a behavior known as facultative bipedalism.

The bones of the forelimb are slender, and projections for muscle attachment are small. Muscle reconstructions in Silesaurus suggest that the forelimb had weak muscles but a rigid stance, more useful as a source of stability rather than mobility. No silesaurid preserves more than a few fragments of the hand, but these rare bones suggest that the hands were small. The Triassic dinosauriform trackway Atreipus may correspond to silesaurid trackmakers. Atreipus has a narrow stance, three-toed foot imprints, and small hand impressions with subtle imprints of up to three or four fingers. The scapula (shoulder blade) is broadest at its upper extent, and its front and rear edges are concave. This is similar to ornithischians but unlike other Triassic dinosauriforms, which tend to have a strap-shaped scapula instead.

=== Hip and hindlimb ===
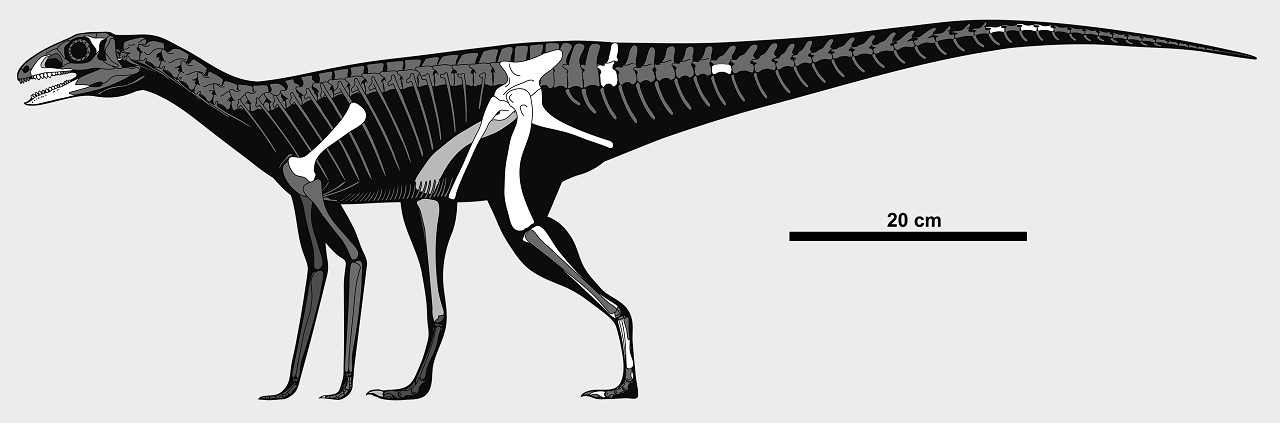
A skeletal diagram of Sacisaurus, showing preserved bones.

The pelvis (hip girdle) and hindlimb are among the most diagnostic parts of the body in dinosauriforms, and silesaurids are no exception. Some silesaurid species are only known from fossils of the hip or femur (thigh bone), yet they can still be distinguished thanks to distinctive ridges and muscle scars. Silesaurids have two to four sacral vertebrae (the portion of the spine which braces the hips).

All silesaurids are propubic, meaning that the pubis (front lower bone of the pelvis) points down and forwards. This is a standard reptile-like arrangement, also inherited by saurischian dinosaurs. It is a major difference from "traditional" ornithischians, which are opisthopubic, meaning that the pubis is bent back to meet the ischium (rear lower bone of the pelvis).

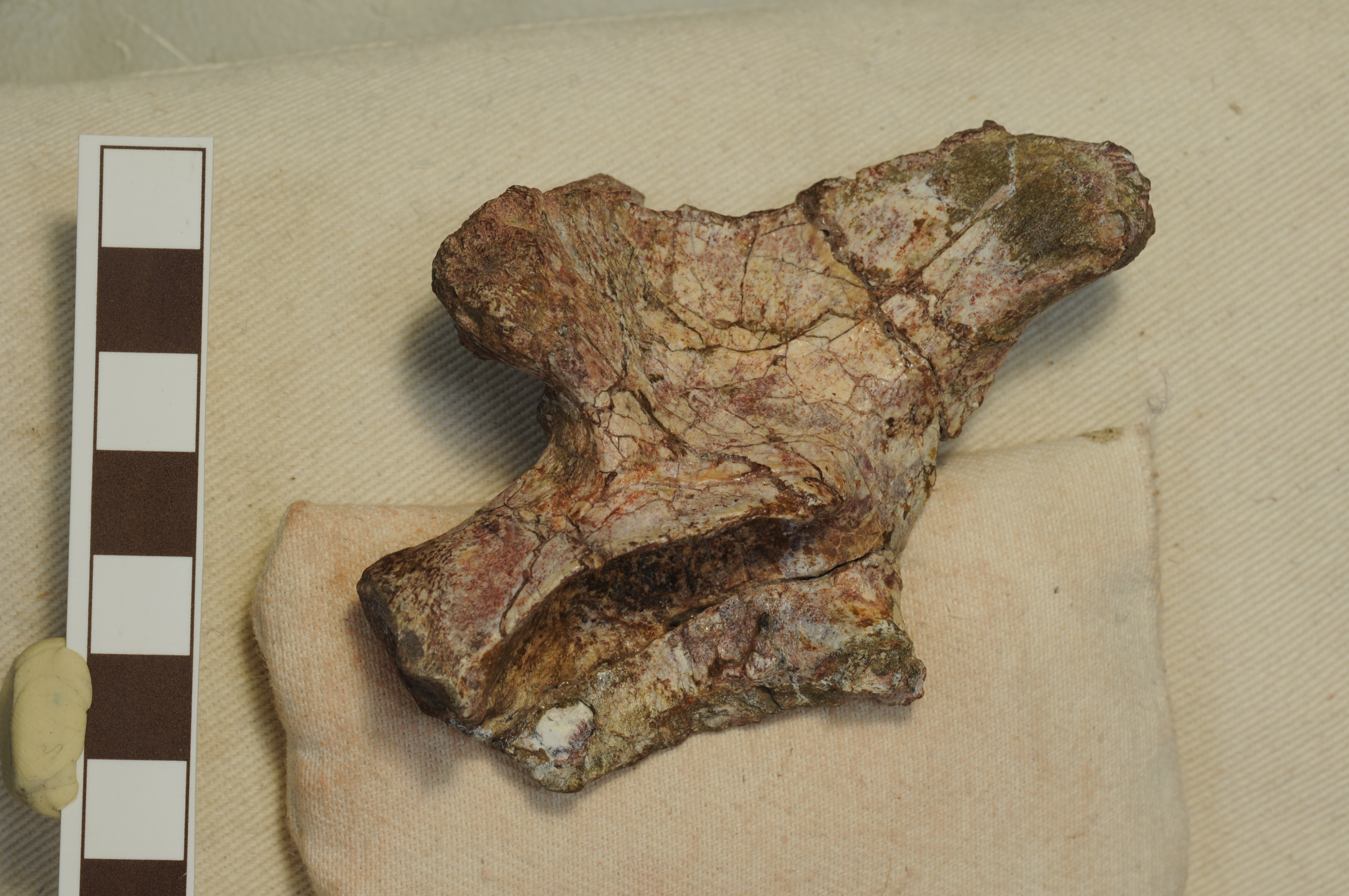
The ilium of Lutungutali

The ilium (upper bone of the pelvis, above the hip socket) has a thick ridge along the upper lip of the hip socket. Additional ridges extend to the upper front and rear corners of the bone. The upper edge is the thinnest part of the ilium, and silesaurids are sometimes described as having a saddle-shaped ilium. There is a small blunt projection at the upper front corner of the ilium. This projection (known as a preacetabular process) is much longer and narrower in "traditional" ornithischians. The lower portion of the ilium forms a wedge-shaped inner wall of the hip socket. In contrast, nearly all dinosaurs have a perforated hip socket with an open space instead of an inner wall. Among silesaurids, the ilium of Kwanasaurus is an intermediate state, with a thin medium-sized preacetabular process and a concave lower ilium, leaving a small gap in the wall of the hip socket.

A comparison of hip joint styles. Silesaurids have pillar-erect hip joints, unlike most dinosaurs.

The head of the femur (the upper end which connects to the hip socket) is slightly offset from the shaft by an obtuse, straight-edged notch. In sulcimentisaurian silesaurids, the surface which directly fits into the hip socket is flattened. Silesaurids have a "pillar-erect" hip joint, where the femur supports the thickened upper lip of the hip socket. A similar hip structure is found in "rauisuchians" and aetosaurs, large Triassic reptiles more closely related to crocodilians. On the other hand, most dinosaurs have an erect hip structure based on a ball-and-socket hip joint, where the head of the femur is rounded, deeply embedded in the hip socket, and sharply offset from the shaft at a curved right angle. Both erect and pillar-erect hip structures allow for a narrow mammal-like gait, unlike the sprawling posture of many other reptiles.

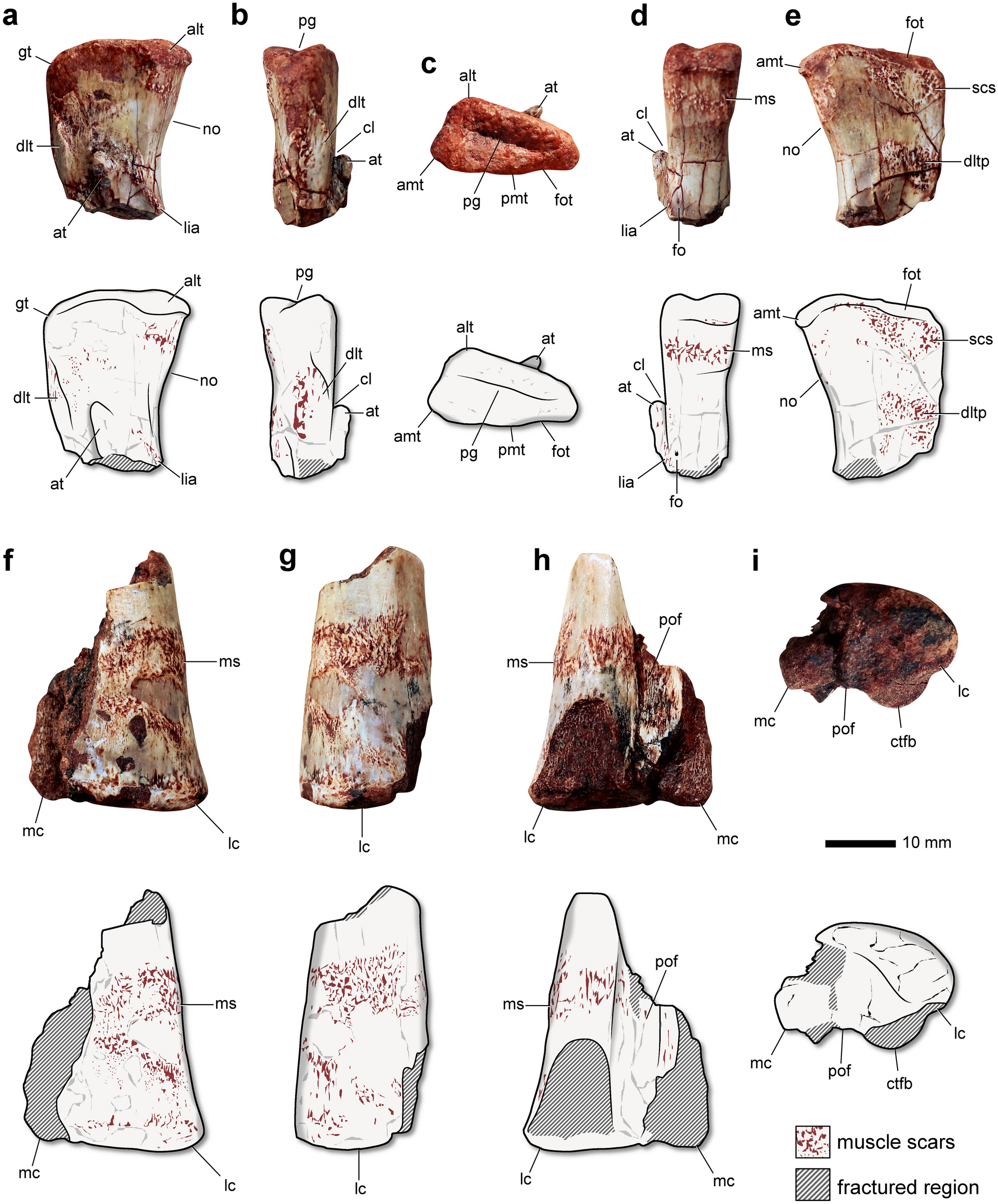
Femur fragments of Amanasaurus, including an upper right femur (a-e) and lower left femur (f-i)

Like other dinosauriforms, the upper half of the femur has a set of bony mounds and crests which provide muscle leverage. The fourth trochanter, on the inner surface of the shaft, connects to muscles which pull the leg back. Silesaurids usually have a small fourth trochanter with a symmetrical ridge-like form. This is unlike the large hook-shaped fourth trochanter of "traditional" ornithischians. The anterior trochanter, on the front surface of the femoral head, connects to muscles which splay the legs. Early silesaurids have a mound-like anterior trochanter connected to a trochanteric shelf, a scar which wraps around the shaft of the femur. In later species the trochanteric shelf may disappear while the anterior trochanter is offset from the shaft by a cleft, similar to "traditional" ornithischians and most theropods.

When seen from behind, the lower end of the femur has a long and wide groove separating its condyles (the two knobs which contribute to the knee joint) and continuing up the lower third of the shaft. The tibia (shin bone) is shorter or equal in length to the femur, while in other early dinosaurs it is longer. Like other dinosauriforms, the ankle is simple and hinge-like. The foot is symmetrical with five toes, the middle toe (III) as the largest and the first and last toes (I and V) as the smallest. The unguals (toe claws) are straight and slightly flattened. Atreipus footprints only include impressions of the middle three toes of the foot, nearly identical to theropod footprints such as Grallator.

== Classification ==
=== Silesaurid subgroups ===
Several clades have been named within silesaurs, intending to provide consistent labeling for the group's internal structure. These internal clades are Sulcimentisauria (named by Martz & Small, 2019) and Parapredentata (named by Norman et al., 2022). If silesaurs are a grade of early ornithischians, then these internal clades may encompass hundreds of different Mesozoic species.

Sulcimentisauria refers to all taxa more closely related to Silesaurus than to Asilisaurus. Most silesaurids qualify as sulcimentisaurians, since Asilisaurus diverged early in the group's evolution. Sulcimentisauria was originally named with the understanding that silesaurids are a non-dinosaurian clade. It has seen continued use by some supporters of the ornithischian hypothesis as well. A few studies prefer not to reuse it beyond its narrow original context of a silesaurid clade. Parapredentata is a clade name exclusive to the ornithischian hypothesis, referring to the least inclusive clade containing Silesaurus and Iguanodon.

If silesaurs qualify as early ornithischians, then a new name is needed for the Jurassic-Cretaceous "traditional" ornithischians, which have their own set of anatomical quirks distinct from any other archosaurs. Several alternate names have been proposed for "traditional" ornithischians, encompassing a clade which starts at heterodontosaurids and continues towards later-branching groups such as thyreophorans, ornithopods, and marginocephalians. Prionodontia is the oldest rough equivalent to "traditional" Ornithischia, though it only received a formal definition in 2022. Another old synonym, Predentata, is universally considered defunct. A newer term with a roughly equivalent definition is Saphornithischia. It was formally defined in 2021, so its usage may be preferred over Prionodontia according to the rules of the PhyloCode.

=== Silesaurids as the sister group to dinosaurs ===
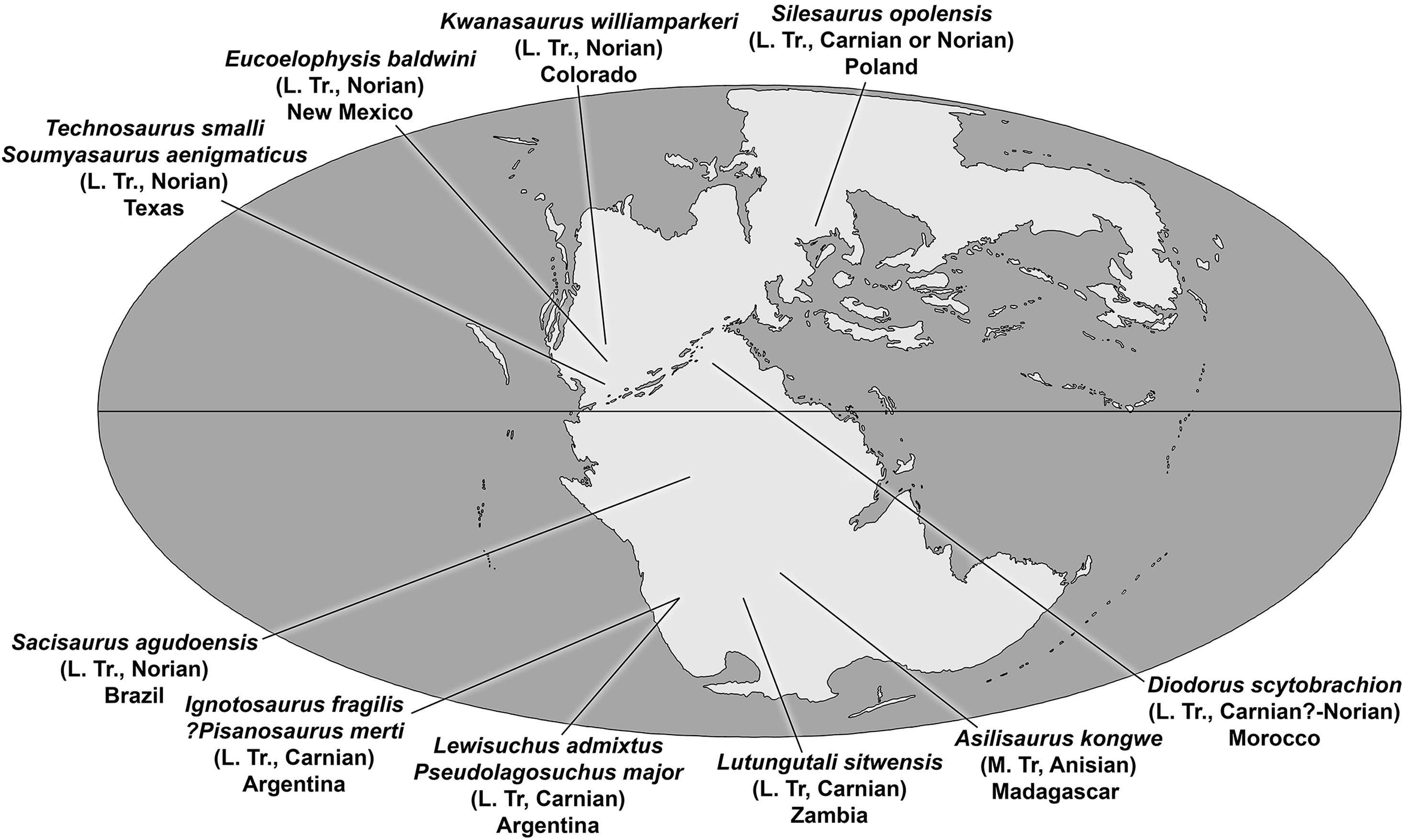
Distribution of silesaurid species as of 2019

During the 2010s, the consensus position on Silesauridae is that they are a clade (an exclusive group with a single common ancestor) and the sister group (next-closest relatives) to Dinosauria. Silesauridae was named in 2010 by Max C. Langer et al. They defined it as a branch-based clade of all archosaurs closer to Silesaurus opolensis than to either Heterodontosaurus tucki (an ornithischian dinosaur) or Marasuchus lilloensis (an early dinosauriform).

At around the same time, Sterling J. Nesbitt et al. (2010) described a new early silesaurid, Asilisaurus, and independently named Silesauridae as a node-based clade consisting of Lewisuchus, Silesaurus, their last common ancestor and all their descendants. Both definitions encompass the same set of animals in studies which regard silesaurids as non-dinosaurian. Nesbitt et al. noted that the earlier definition by Langer et al. did not include a diagnosis, and therefore was not sufficient to create a ranked family-level name according to the ICZN. Therefore, the family Silesauridae is attributed to Nesbitt et al. (2010) while the clade Silesauridae is attributed to Langer et al. (2010).

Langer, Nesbitt, and colleagues cemented proposals originating in the late 2000s. These predecessor studies each found a clade or grade of non-dinosaurian dinosauriforms now recognized as silesaurids: "Pseudolagosuchus" (Lewisuchus), Eucoelophysis, and Silesaurus. The analyses of Langer et al. (2010) and Nesbitt et al. (2010) set the groundwork for a decade of incremental improvements, with each new addition inheriting the non-dinosaurian silesaurid hypothesis in the process.

In 2017, Matthew Baron, David Norman and Paul Barrett published a controversial study in the journal Nature. Their study argued that theropods and ornithischians were sister groups, the so-called Ornithoscelida hypothesis. This result contradicted the Ornithischa-Saurischia split which has been the consensus in dinosaur paleontology for over a century. Other results from the analysis raised fewer objections. For example, they also found that Silesauridae is a monophyletic (clade) sister group to Dinosauria. Their study also recovered the enigmatic dinosauriform Agnosphitys near the base of Silesauridae, close to Lewisuchus and its synonym Pseudolagosuchus. Support for Ornithoscelida was apparently fleeting at best, and Baron and Norman have more recently supported placing ornithischians among silesaurs rather than with theropods.

Cau (2018) recovered silesaurids as the sister group to dinosaurs, and proposed the new clade Dracohors for dinosauriforms more derived than Marasuchus. The only reptiles which consistently meet this definition are dinosaurs and silesaurids. If silesaurids qualify as dinosaurs, then Dracohors would be a superfluous term, roughly equivalent to Dinosauria.

Pisanosaurus mertii is widely recognized as a unique species similar to both silesaurids and ornithischians, notwithstanding the placement of other silesaurids. Some of the studies which favor non-dinosaurian silesaurids classify Pisanosaurus as an ornithischian, while others classify it as a silesaurid. If Pisanosaurus is a silesaurid, then a straightforward reading of ICZN rules may force Silesauridae to be replaced by an older name, Pisanosauridae, which was erected by Rodolfo Casamiquela in 1967. However, Pisanosauridae is an obscure and rarely-used name, while Silesauridae is a far more abundant term. In addition, the relationship between silesaurids and Pisanosaurus is not stable enough to justify a rename.

The following cladogram represents the results of Martz & Small, 2019, showing silesaurids as a clade and the sister group of dinosaurs.

- Dinosauriformes
  - Lagosuchus
  - - Ignotosaurus
    - Dinosauria
      - Ornithischia
      - Saurischia
    - Silesauridae
      - Lewisuchus
      - - Soumyasaurus
        - - Asilisaurus
          - Sulcimentisauria
            - Silesaurus
            - - Sacisaurus
              - Technosaurus
              - - Lutungutali
                - Diodorus
              - - Kwanasaurus
                - Eucoelophysis

=== Silesaurids as early ornithischians ===
Individual silesaurid species have been compared with ornithischians for decades, long before Silesauridae was formally named in 2010. Pisanosaurus, Technosaurus, and Sacisaurus were all regarded as potential ornithischians as soon as they were discovered. Even the original description of Silesaurus in 2003 could not discount potential ornithischian affinities. Despite this early attention, a potential connection between silesaurids and ornithischians receded from broader attention until the idea was revived in earnest late in the 2010s.

A phylogenetic analysis developed by Cabreira et al. (2016) classified silesaurids as ornithischian dinosaurs, with Asilisaurus as the earliest ornithischian and other silesaurids as a clade, the next rung up on the ornithischian family tree. This analysis served as a base for further updates, including a study by Müller & Garcia (2020) focusing specifically on silesaurids. Müller & Garcia (2020) argued that silesaurids were early ornithischians in a "silesaurid" grade (a group defined by a distinctive stage of anatomical evolution, ancestral to a later group with more divergent anatomy). Another study by Norman et al. (2022) examined the question of silesaurid relationships in detail, comparing and contrasting their anatomy with ornithischians and other dinosaurs. They also concluded that silesaurids are a paraphyletic group (a grade) on the branch leading to traditional Ornithischia. Fonseca et al. (2024) found a similar result in their analysis of ornithischian evolution.

If Silesauridae retains the definition established by Langer et al. (2010), all taxa closer to Silesaurus than to Heterodontosaurus or Marasuchus, then its scope would become very limited within the ornithischian hypothesis. As part of a grade, Silesaurus occupies only one narrow offshoot in the stepwise evolution of "silesaur" anatomy towards Jurassic ornithischians like Heterodontosaurus. For example, the analysis of Müller & Garcia (2023) recovered a small clade of Amanasaurus, Ignotosaurus and Silesaurus, which makes them the only members of Silesauridae under its original definition. Further revisions recovered an even smaller clade with only Ignotosaurus and Silesaurus. Some studies even regard Silesauridae as a monotypic clade (containing only Silesaurus), while "silesaurs" as a whole persist as an informal grade.

The following cladogram represents the results of Sen et al. (2026), showing silesaurids as a grade of Triassic ornithischian dinosaurs.

- Dinosauria
  - Saurischia
  - Ornithischia
    - - Saltopus
      - Lewisuchus
    - - Itaguyra
      - - Soumyasaurus
        - - Asilisaurus
          - Sulcimentisauria
            - Gamatavus
            - - Gondwanax
              - - Amanasaurus
                - - - Diodorus
                    - Rewasaurus
                  - - Technosaurus
                    - Parapredentata
                      - - Ignotosaurus
                        - Silesaurus
                      - - - Sacisaurus
                          - - Lutungutali
                            - Kwanasaurus
                        - - Eucoelophysis
                          - - Pisanosaurus
                            - - Laquintasaura
                              - Prionodontia ("traditional" Ornithischia)
