= Paraíso do Sul =

Municipality of Rio Grande do Sul, Brazil

- Municipality
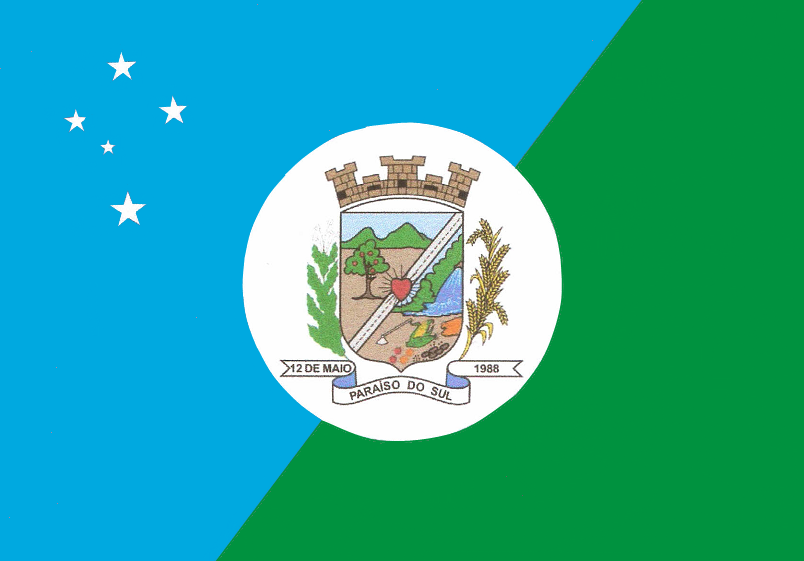
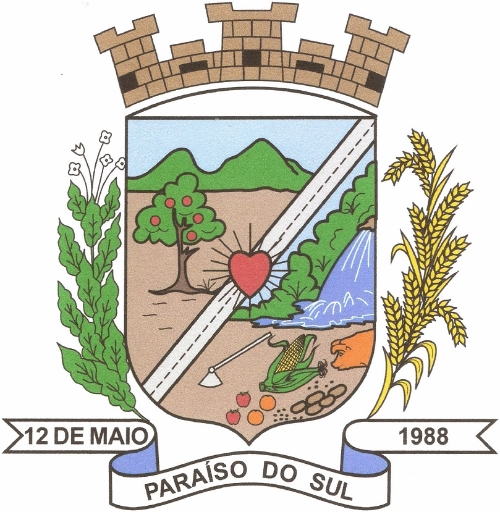
- Flag Coat of arms

- Location within Rio Grande do Sul

- Location in Brazil
- Coordinates: 29°40′S 53°11′W
- Country: Brazil
- State: Rio Grande do Sul

Population (2022)
  - Total: 6,519
- Time zone: UTC−3 (BRT)

Paraíso do Sul (Paradise of the South) is a municipality in the state of Rio Grande do Sul, Brazil.

== See also ==
- List of municipalities in Rio Grande do Sul
