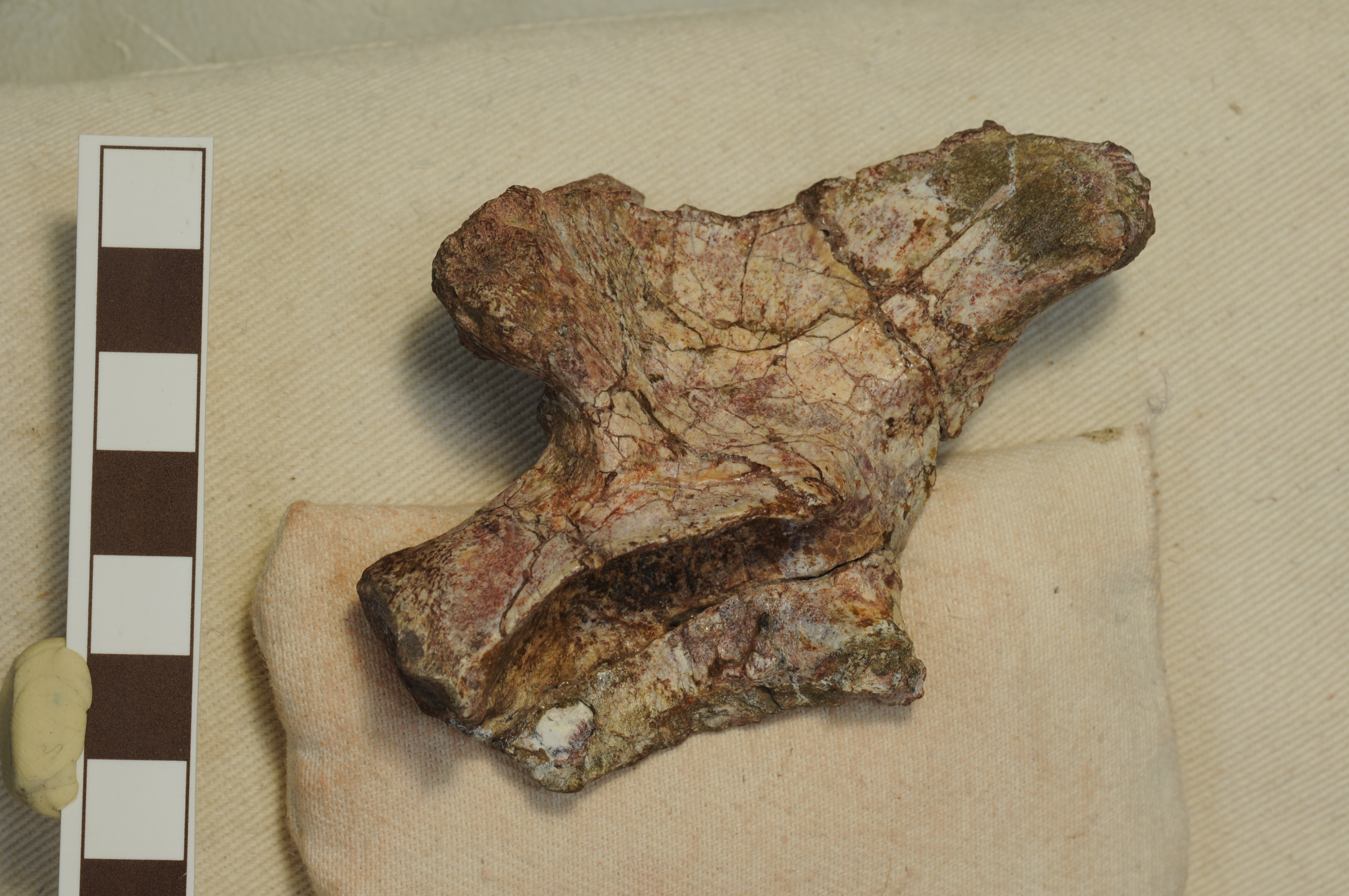
- Holotype ilium with a scale bar

Scientific classification
- Kingdom: Animalia
- Phylum: Chordata
- Class: Reptilia
- Clade: Dinosauria (?)
- Clade: †Ornithischia (?)
- Family: †Silesauridae
- Clade: †Sulcimentisauria
- Genus: †Lutungutali; Peecook et al., 2013

Type species
- †Lutungutali sitwensis Peecook et al., 2013

= Lutungutali =

Lutungutali Temporal range: ?Middle Triassic, ?Anisian

Extinct genus of reptiles

Lutungutali (meaning "high hip" in the Bemba language) is an extinct genus of silesaurid dinosauriform from the Middle Triassic of Zambia. The single type species of the genus is Lutungutali sitwensis. Lutungutali was named in 2013 and described from a fossil specimen, holotype NHCC LB32, including hip bones and tail vertebrae. The specimen was collected in 2009 from the upper Ntawere Formation, which dates to the Anisian stage of the Middle Triassic. Lutungutali is the first known silesaurid from Zambia and, along with the Tanzanian silesaurid Asilisaurus and dinosauriform Nyasasaurus, the oldest bird-line archosaur known from body fossils (i.e. parts of the skeleton).

== Description ==
Lutungutali is known from parts of its pelvis and from four caudal vertebrae that make up the base of the tail. These bones represent one individual, although bones that may belong to Lutungutali representing eight other individuals were collected from the same fossil site in 2011. Lutungutali shares the following three features (synapomorphies) with other early dinosauriforms:

- A small area over which the pubis and ischium bones of the hip connect.
- A depression or fossa on the ischium where it connects with the pubis and ilium.
- The length of the ischium exceeding the length of the iliac blade across the top of the hip.

Lutungutali also shares two synapomorphies with the clade or evolutionary grouping containing silesaurids and dinosaurs:

- A crest of bone extending upward from the supraacetabular crest (a bony ridge above the acetabulum or hip socket) that joins with the preacetabular process, the forward-most projection of the iliac blade.
- A lengthy connection between the two pairs of ischia, except for a division of the two bones near their connection with the rest of the hip.

In addition, it shares two synapomorphies with other silesaurids:

- A straight lower margin of the hip socket on the ilium (more basal dinosauriforms have a convex margin, and dinosaurs have a concave margin).
- The lack of a ridge of bone behind the hip socket called the antitrochanter.

Lutungutali has one unique feature or autapomorphy that distinguishes it from all other dinosauriforms: an iliac blade that is taller than the portion of the ilium that forms the hip socket. This feature is references in its name, which means "high hip" in the Bemba Language.

== Phylogeny and evolutionary significance ==
Lutungutali belongs to Silesauridae, a family of archosaurs that is very closely related to Dinosauria. Silesaurids are known from southern Africa, Poland, the southwestern United States, and South America. When Lutungutali was named in 2013, a phylogenetic analysis (an analysis of evolutionary relationships) grouped it with the most derived silesaurids from the Late Triassic. The closest silesaurid in both space and time to Lutungutali is Asilisaurus from the Anisian-age Manda Beds of Tanzania, yet it was found to be a more basal silesaurid. Below is a cladogram from the analysis:

- Archosauria
  - Pseudosuchia
  - Avemetatarsalia
    - Pterosauromorpha
    - - Lagerpetidae
      - - Marasuchus
        - - Silesauridae
            - Pseudolagosuchus/Lewisuchus
            - - Asilisaurus
              - - Lutungutali
                - Silesaurus
                - Sacisaurus
                - Eucoelophysis
          - Dinosauria

Lutungutali and Asilisaurus are the two oldest known members of Avemetatarsalia, the line of archosaurs that includes birds. The oldest known member of the other line of archosaurs, Pseudosuchia (crocodile-line archosaurs), is from the Olenekian stage of the Early Triassic, meaning that the first members of Avemetatarsalia must have appeared by this time. However, before the discovery of Asilisaurus (which was named in 2010), the oldest known avemetatarsalians were from the Ladinian stage of the Middle Triassic. Because Asilisaurus and Lutungutali are relatively derived members of Avemetatarsalia, their presence in the Anisian stage of the Middle Triassic suggests that avemetatarsalians underwent a rapid diversification at a time in their evolutionary history that was earlier than previously thought.
