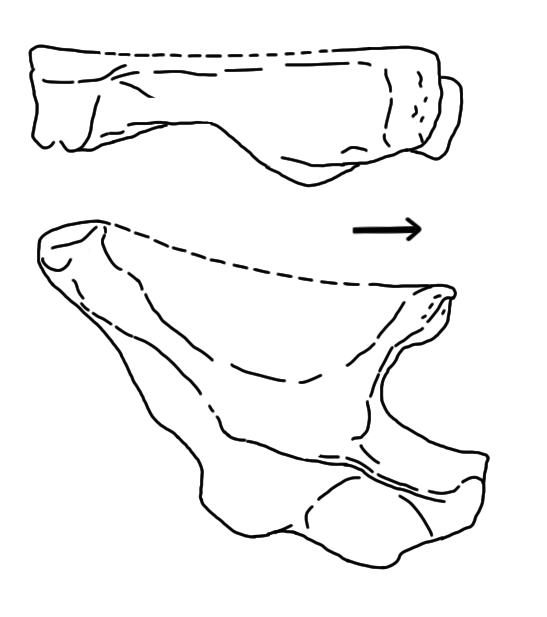
- The holotype ilium, seen in dorsal and lateral view

Scientific classification
- Kingdom: Animalia
- Phylum: Chordata
- Clade: Dinosauria (?)
- Clade: †Ornithischia (?)
- Family: †Silesauridae
- Genus: †Ignotosaurus; Martínez et al. 2013

Type species
- †Ignotosaurus fragilis Martínez et al. 2013

= Ignotosaurus =

Ignotosaurus Temporal range: Carnian ~231.7–231.1 Ma

Extinct genus of reptiles

Ignotosaurus is an extinct genus of silesaurid dinosauriform known from the Late Triassic (Carnian) Cancha de Bochas Member of the Ischigualasto Formation in the Ischigualasto-Villa Unión Basin in northwestern Argentina. It was therefore contemporary with early dinosaurs such as Herrerasaurus, and lived in the same place.

== Etymology ==
The name, meaning 'unknown lizard' from the Latin 'ignotus' 'unknown' and the Greek 'σαυρος' 'lizard', is quite apt as there is only one specimen known and this specimen is only known from the right ilium. This ilium is approximately 70 millimetres (2.8 in) long, but it is difficult to say accurately how large Ignotosaurus was.

== Description ==
The ilium is slender, and its blade has an extremely thin central portion (only 1 millimetre (0.039 in) thick), hence the specific name 'fragilis'. It has the saddle-shaped lateral profile of most silesaurids, and is longer than it is deep. The acetabulum has a back wall created by a ventral flange and this closes a socket as it is in contact with the ischium and pubis. The supraacetabular crest is laterally oriented and forms part of the articulation for the femur. A ridge rises from the dorsal edge of this crest and joins the preacetabular process, as in the close relative Silesaurus. The preacteabular process is flattened anteroposteriorly and is angled at 90° to the iliac blade, pointing anterolaterally - these are the diagnostic features of this species. The end of the process has a rugose growth, but it is less extensive than that of Silesaurus. The postacetabular process is long and has a brevis fossa present on the ventral side. It has a thick rectangular cross-section and a rugose area at the end. The pubic peduncle is long and stout, with a prominent dorsal margin.

Ignotosaurus is thought to be most closely related to Silesaurus, Sacisaurus and Eucoelophysis, but as only one of the three characteristic features for silesaurids is preserved this is not certain (the other features are on the femur and tibia, which are not preserved).

It is thought that the Ischigualasto Formation at this time was a river basin habitat with abundant vegetation. As Ignotosaurus was probably a herbivore, like other silesaurids, it would probably have flourished here, competing for food with rhynchosaurs, cynodonts and possibly some early dinosaurs.
