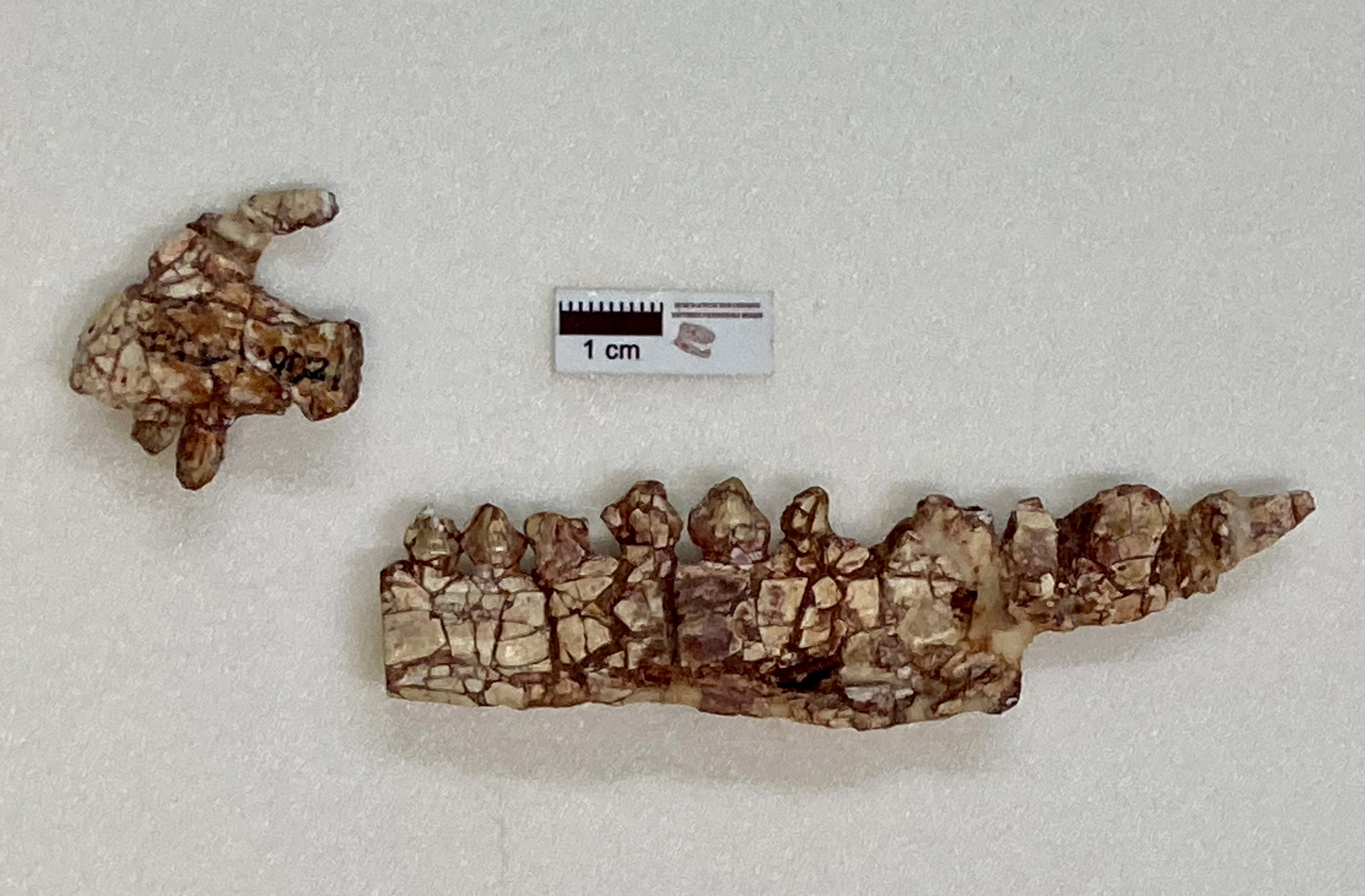
- Premaxilla and dentary of Technosaurus smalli in the collection of the Museum of Texas Tech University.

Scientific classification
- Kingdom: Animalia
- Phylum: Chordata
- Clade: Dinosauria (?)
- Clade: †Ornithischia (?)
- Family: †Silesauridae
- Clade: †Sulcimentisauria
- Genus: †Technosaurus; Chatterjee, 1984

Type species
- †Technosaurus smalli Chatterjee, 1984

= Technosaurus =

Technosaurus Temporal range: Late Triassic, 210 Ma

Extinct genus of reptiles

Technosaurus (meaning "Tech lizard", for Texas Tech University) is an extinct genus of silesaurid dinosauriforms, from the Late Triassic Cooper Canyon Formation (Dockum Group) of Texas, United States.

For about 20 years after its description, it was thought to be a basal ornithischian dinosaur, but better remains of other Triassic archosaurs have cast doubt on this interpretation. As named, it was a chimera of different animals.

== Description and history ==
Technosaurus is based on TTUP P9021, which initially consisted of a premaxilla (tip of the upper jaw), two lower jaw pieces, a back vertebra, and an astragalus. Technosaurus and its type species, T. smalli, were named by Sankar Chatterjee in 1984. He described it as a fabrosaurid, a clade of small, early ornithischians now considered to have been an artificial grouping. Material from the quarry where P9021 was found is disassociated and comes from a variety of Late Triassic animals, which would prove problematic.

The genus was reviewed in 1991 by Paul Sereno, who interpreted the premaxilla and a fragment from the front of the lower jaw as pertaining to a hatchling prosauropod, and found the vertebra to be indeterminate and the astragalus an unidentifiable fragment. Thus, he restricted the remains to be considered Technosaurus to the second lower jaw piece, a posterior fragment. Further review in the light of new remains spurred re-evaluation of purported Triassic dinosaurs, particularly ornithischians named from tooth or jaw material. Irmis et al. (2007) agreed with the removal of the vertebra and astragalus, but found no characteristics that were unambiguously dinosaurian in the skull fragments. They noted similarities to Silesaurus in the jaw fragments Sereno had excluded, and themselves excluded the posterior fragment as actually belonging to the unusual rauisuchian Shuvosaurus. These authors would later restate their case, concluding that Technosaurus, defined only by the premaxilla and non-Shuvosaurus lower jaw fragment, was a valid, diagnostic genus, but could not be definitely classified beyond Archosauriformes incertae sedis, and was unlikely to be either an ornithischian or sauropodomorph dinosaur.
