= Eucoelophysis =

Eucoelophysis Temporal range: Late Triassic, mid-Norian (~212 Ma)

Scientific classification
- Kingdom: Animalia
- Phylum: Chordata
- Class: Reptilia
- Clade: Dinosauria (?)
- Clade: †Ornithischia (?)
- Family: †Silesauridae
- Clade: †Sulcimentisauria
- Genus: †Eucoelophysis
- Species: †E. baldwini

Binomial name
- †Eucoelophysis baldwini Sullivan & Lucas, 1999

Extinct genus of reptiles

Eucoelophysis (meaning "true hollow form") is a genus of silesaurid dinosauriform from the Late Triassic (Norian) period Chinle Formation of New Mexico. It was assumed to be a coelophysid upon description, but a study by Nesbitt et al. found that it was actually a close relative of Silesaurus, which was independently supported by Ezcurra (2016), who found it to be the sister group to Dinosauria, and Silesaurus as the next most basal taxon.

== History ==
=== Orphan Mesa fossils ===
In the 1880s, David Baldwin collected vertebrate fossils from the Late Triassic of north-central New Mexico for American paleontologist Edward Drinker Cope. In 1887, Cope classified Baldwin's specimens as two new species of Coelurus: Coelurus bauri and Coelurus longicollis. Later that year, Cope recognized the fossils as a separate genus from Coelurus, so he moved C. bauri and C. longicollis to Tanystropheus while adding a third new species, Tanystrophaeus willistoni. In 1889, he again revisited their classification, creating the new genus Coelophysis for the three species, all from the same area of New Mexico.

In the intervening century, New Mexico's Late Triassic stratigraphy became more well-defined. This allowed for a precise understanding of Baldwin's collection efforts. Baldwin's type locality, which he referred to as Arroyo Seco, is now understood as the area of Orphan Mesa in the Petrified Forest Formation (or Petrified Forest Member of the Chinle Formation). Another dinosaur-like specimen was found in the Orphan Mesa area in 1983, at Cross Quarry (a site named after its discoverer, Robert Cross). Cross's specimen, NMMNH P-22298, became known as the "Orphan Mesa theropod". It is an incomplete skeleton of an immature dinosauriform, preserving several vertebrae, the scapulacoracoid, parts of the pelvis and most of the hindlimb.

By the late 20th century, paleontologists agreed that the Orphan Mesa fossils which inspired Cope to name Coelophysis were too incomplete to be distinguishable from other fragmentary dinosaur remains. Yet the name Coelophysis bauri was already widely used for a massive assemblage of coelophysoid theropod remains discovered in 1947 at the Whitaker Quarry of Ghost Ranch, near Abiquiu, New Mexico. In 1996, the International Commission on Zoological Nomenclature designated a complete skeleton and skull from the Whitaker Quarry as the holotype of Coelophysis bauri. This decision salvaged Coelophysis bauri, but it also left Baldwin and Cope's original Orphan Mesa fossils (C. longicollis, C. willistoni, and the specimens named C. bauri by Cope) without a genus and species.

In response, American paleontologists Robert M. Sullivan and Spencer G. Lucas naming a new taxon for the NMMNH P-22298 specimen, to which they also referred a specimen previously included within C. longicollis that Baldwin had collected. Sullivan and Lucas named this taxon Eucoelophysis baldwini in 1999. The species name honors David Baldwin, while the genus name was a reference to the status of the material as the original Coelophysis, derived from the Ancient Greek words eu ("true"), and coelo and physi meaning "hollow" and "nature". There was also additional material found around Orphan Mesa that may belong to Eucoelophysis, but that lacked overlap or diagnostic traits to make such a referral confident.

=== Ghost Ranch fossils ===
The Whitaker Quarry at Ghost Ranch has long been renowned for its concentration of Coelophysis fossils, but it is not the only fossil-rich location within the boundaries of Ghost Ranch. In 1998, Mark Snyder discovered another fossil site at the ranch. This site, now known as the Snyder Quarry, is from the Petrified Forest Member of the Chinle Formation, dated to around 212 million years ago during the Revueltian faunachron of the mid-Norian stage. In other words, it was slightly older than the Coelophysis quarry and around the same age as the strata exposed at Orphan Mesa. In 2000, American paleontologists Andrew Heckert and colleagues identified Eucoelophysis-like fossils from the Snyder Quarry. They suggested that these fossils may belong to a new species, and reiterated this perspective in 2003.

Additional isolated material potentially referable to Eucoelophysis was identified from the nearby Hayden Quarry by Irmis and colleagues in 2007, including a dentary, ilium, and a femur. This material was not found together, but each individual bone shows similarities to Silesaurus, and they are from the same age and region as Eucoelophysis. The referrals of the Hayden Quarry material was supported by American paleontologists Benjamin Breeden and colleagues in 2017, as well as Jeffrey Martz and Bryan Small in 2019, who identified additional skull and postcranial fossils. Though there is not clear overlap between the skull bones and the diagnostic elements of Eucoelophysis, the hindlimb material can be confidently referred. Only a single silesaurid is presumed to have been present at the locality. The Hayden Quarry specimens were described in detail by Breeden et al. (2025).

An articulated skeleton (TMP 1986.63.33) from the Coelophysis quarry, previously considered a specimen of Coelophysis, was moved to Eucoelophysis by American paleontologist Larry Rinehart and colleagues in 2009, but it was returned to Coelophysis by American paleontologist Chris Griffin in 2018.

== Classification ==
Sullivan and Lucas originally placed Eucoelophysis within Ceratosauria, as a close relative of Coelophysis, Syntarsus rhodesiensis, and Syntarsus kayentakatae.

The identify of Eucoelophysis was reevaluated in 2006 by Argentine paleontologist Martín Ezcurra, who identified that many of the features used by Sullivan and Lucas to support the identity of Eucoelophysis were instead shared amongst all early dinosaurs, with Eucoelophysis instead appearing more similar to the non-dinosaur Silesaurus. Neither the Snyder Quarry specimens nor the material originally assigned to C. longicollis were found to share features with Eucoelophysis by Ezcurra, who identified them instead as indeterminate coelophysoids.

Independent of Ezcurra, American paleontologists Sterling Nesbitt, Randall Irmis and William Parker reviewed purported Late Triassic theropods of North America in 2007, including Eucoelophysis. They found that Eucoelophysis was not a theropod or even a dinosaur, instead related to Silesaurus and Pseudolagosuchus (Lewisuchus). They also reconsidered what material belonged to Eucoelophysis, as only the hindlimb was found articulated. The bonebed locality included other reptiles such as Typothorax. The lack of clear features in the vertebrae, and differences between the pelvis of Eucoelophysis and Silesaurus, led Nesbitt and colleagues to only retain the hindlimb as Eucoelophysis, with the rest of the material as uncertain identity.
