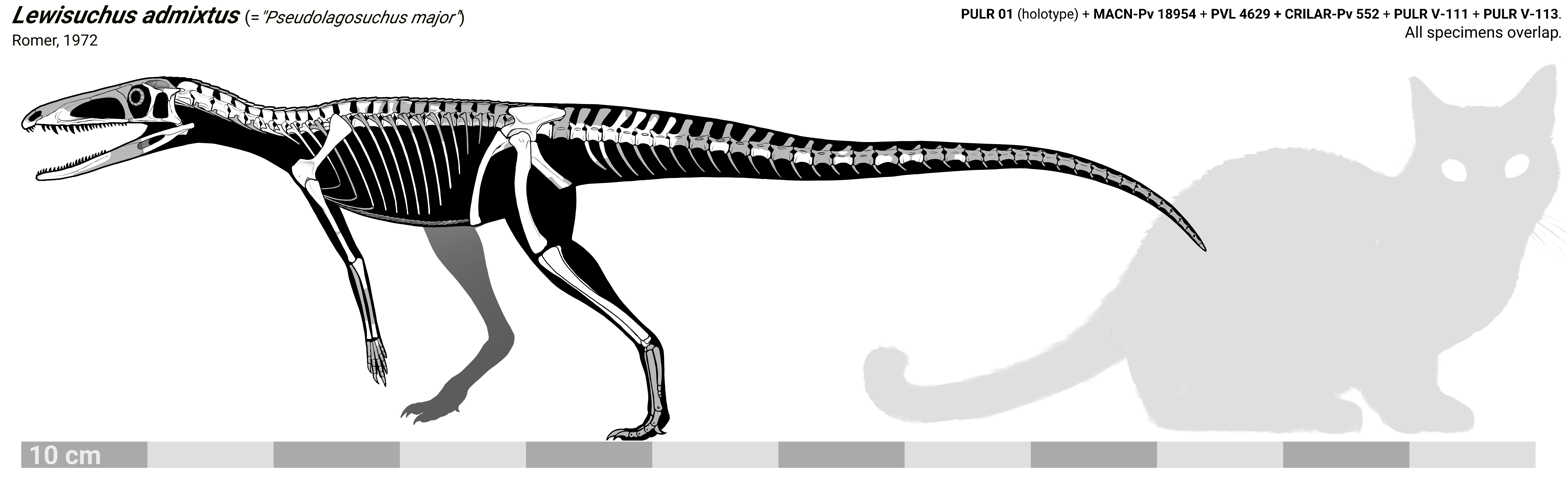
- Skeletal reconstruction of Lewisuchus admixtus

Scientific classification
- Kingdom: Animalia
- Phylum: Chordata
- Clade: Dinosauria (?)
- Clade: †Ornithischia (?)
- Family: †Silesauridae
- Genus: †Lewisuchus; Romer, 1972
- Species: †L. admixtus

Binomial name
- †Lewisuchus admixtus Romer, 1972

Synonyms
- Pseudolagosuchus major Arcucci, 1987

= Lewisuchus =

Lewisuchus Temporal range: Carnian ~236–234 Ma

Extinct genus of reptiles

Lewisuchus is a genus of archosaur that lived during the Late Triassic (early Carnian). As a silesaurid dinosauriform, it was a member of the group of reptiles most commonly considered to be the closest relatives of dinosaurs (possibly true dinosaurs themselves). Lewisuchus was about 1 metre (3.3 ft) long. Fossils have been found in the Chañares Formation of Argentina. It exhibited osteoderms along its back.

== History ==
The first remains of Lewisuchus were discovered in a 1964-1965 joint expedition by the Museo de La Plata and Harvard's Museum of Comparative Zoology. These remains were preserved in a carbonate nodule recovered from the Chañares Formation of Argentina. It contained a partial skeleton of Lewisuchus, including parts of the skull, braincase, many vertebrae, scapulocoracoids, humeri, and tibiae. A gomphodont and bones from several other species of archosaurs were also preserved in the same nodule. An isolated lower jaw and foot bones were also initially referred to Lewisuchus, but these were later identified as belong to proterochampsids. This is also likely true of an astragalus found alongside the skeleton.

Alfred Romer named Lewisuchus as a new genus in 1972, based on the partial skeleton which at that point was stored at the Museo de La Plata with catalogue number 64-XI-14-14. The generic name honored Arnold D. Lewis, the chief preparator who discovered the skeleton while working on the recovered nodule. Like many other early archosaurs and crocodilian relatives, it also references Soûkhos, the Greek name for the Egyptian crocodile god Sobek. The species name "admixtus" refers to the mixture of different species preserved along with the holotype. The holotype is now housed at the Paleontology Museum at the National University of La Rioja (PULR) with catalogue number PULR 01.

=== Pseudolagosuchus ===
Another Chañares archosaur was described by Andrea Arcucci in 1987. This archosaur encompassed four specimens stored at the Miguel Lillo Institute (PVL) of the University of Tucuman, the PULR, and the Museo Argentino de Ciencias Naturales (MACN). Arcucci named a new archosaur genus based on these specimens: Pseudolagosuchus major. It was originally considered a close relative of its namesake, the small dinosauriform Lagosuchus. The holotype of Pseudolagosuchus, PVL 4629, included most of a left hindlimb and pelvis as well as a fragmentary ankle, vertebrae, and ribs. Other specimens included PVL 3454 (fragments of the hip and hindlimb), MACN 18954 (vertebrae and portions of the hindlimb and ankle), and PULR 53 (tail vertebrae and bones from the ankle region). A 1996 study on dinosaur origins by Fernando Novas also placed a well-preserved femur and tibia (erroneously labelled UPLR 53) within the genus, and this may also be the case with PVL 3455, an indeterminate partial skeleton with some similarities to Arcucci's original material.

Despite not sharing much overlapping material, some paleontologists have proposed that Pseudolagosuchus major represented the same species of animal as Lewisuchus admixtus. If this is demonstrated to be the case, the name Lewisuchus would have priority over Pseudolagosuchus due to having been named earlier. Arcucci argued towards synonymizing the two as early as 1997. A 2010 study in the Journal Nature by Nesbitt et al. also made a case for their synonymy, as they were approximately the same size, came from the same locality and strata, and both were found to be basal members of the recently named family Silesauridae. Many other studies supported these arguments, sometimes even scoring the two as a single taxon in their phylogenetic analyses. Several hindlimb, hip, and vertebral fossils (PVL 3456, PULR-V 112 and PULR-V 113) have additionally been referred to Lewisuchus based on their similarity to Pseudolagosuchus remains. However, Bittencourt et al.'s 2014 redescription of the Lewisuchus holotype refrained from synonymizing the two due to a lack of data, with the only overlapping material being the tibia and a few cervical (neck) vertebrae. No unambiguous characteristics were shared between these scraps, and one tibia referred to Pseudolagosuchus (Novas's 'UPLR 53') seemed to have a curvature different from that of Lewisuchus's holotype.

A new specimen of Lewisuchus discovered in 2013 was described by Martin Ezcurra et al. in 2019, helping to settle the synonymy debate. This new specimen, CRILAR-Pv 552, was a partial skeleton incorporating parts of the skeleton previously only known in either Lewisuchus (such as the skull) or in Pseudolagosuchus (such as the hip and hindlimbs). It also provided details of the premaxilla, inner ear, and lower forelimbs, which were not preserved in any previous remains. The individual bones of CRILAR-Pv 552 were basically identical to their counterparts in Lewisuchus and Pseudolagosuchus specimens, providing irrefutable evidence that Pseudolagosuchus referred to the same species of reptile as Lewisuchus, and establishing Lewisuchus admixtus as the valid name for all fossils previously referenced with either name.
