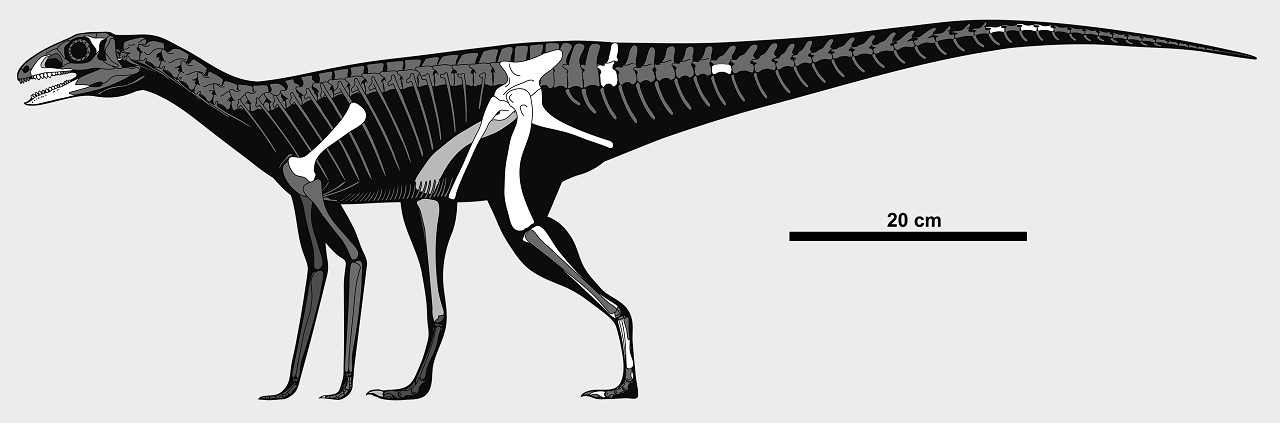
- Skeletal reconstruction of Sacisaurus agudoensis. Known elements are in white.

Scientific classification
- Kingdom: Animalia
- Phylum: Chordata
- Class: Reptilia
- Clade: Dinosauria (?)
- Clade: †Ornithischia (?)
- Family: †Silesauridae
- Clade: †Sulcimentisauria
- Genus: †Sacisaurus; Ferigolo & Langer 2006

Species
- S. agudoensis Ferigolo & Langer 2006 (type)

= Sacisaurus =

Sacisaurus Temporal range: Late Triassic ~225 Ma

Extinct genus of reptiles

Sacisaurus ("Saci lizard") is a silesaurid dinosauriform from the Late Triassic (Norian) Caturrita Formation of southern Brazil. The scientific name, Sacisaurus agudoensis, refers to the city where the species was found, Agudo in the Rio Grande do Sul state, whereas Sacisaurus refers to Saci, a one-legged creature from Brazilian mythology, because among the dozens of fossil material unearthed, 35 right femora were collected whereas only 1 left femur was found.

== Characteristics ==
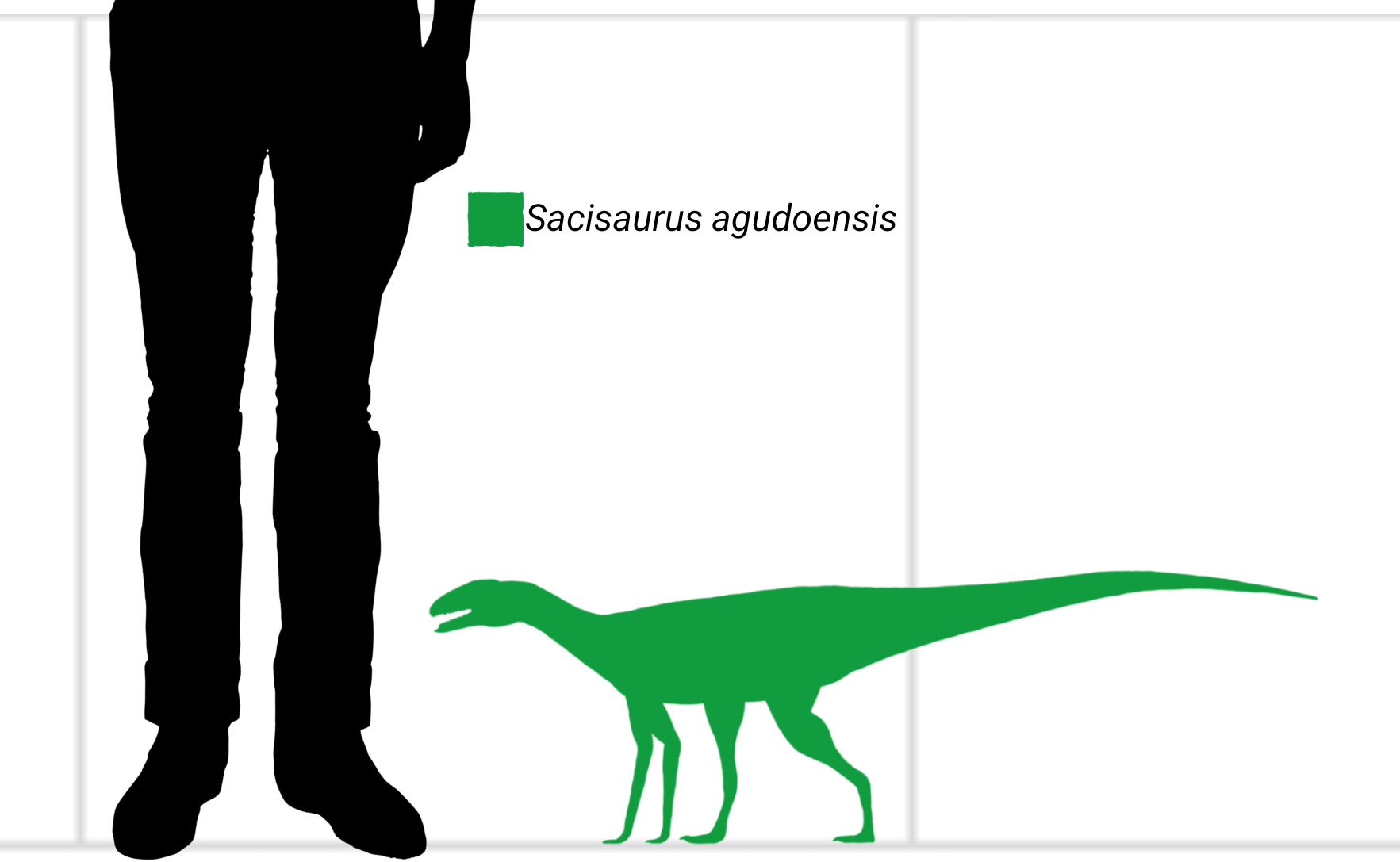
Size comparison of S. agudoensis

Sacisaurus was approximately 1.1 metres (3.6 ft) long and 35 centimetres (1.15 ft) high, based on the largest femoral specimen. Some elements that were originally mentioned in the description study were reassigned to other taxa afterwards. Its long and strong legs indicate that it was a fast animal. The biggest teeth of the genus were just 3 millimetres (0.12 in) long.

Life reconstruction of Sacisaurus agudoensis.

The well-preserved jaw indicates that Sacisaurus was an herbivore, and there is a process at the tip that resembles the ornithischian predentary bone. Further research attempted to define if Sacisaurus was the oldest ornithischian dinosaur. In 2011, a cladistic analysis of some of its morphological particularities found that its closest relative was the silesaurid Diodorus, from Morocco.

== History ==
Sacisaurus was discovered in 2001 in the small municipality of Agudo, in the countryside of Rio Grande do Sul state. With 50 bones, scientists led by paleontologist Jorge Ferigolo assembled the skeleton and speculated on how the animal might have lived. The fossil was presented for the first time in the 2nd Latin American Congress of Vertebrate Paleontology in 2005. .

After the work of Brazilian scientists, the announcement of the discovery of the new species was made on November 1, 2006 at the University of São Paulo, Ribeirão Preto, where the bones were identified and the paper was published in the British scientific journal Historical Biology: A Journal of Paleobiology on October 30, 2006.

The discovery helped scientists to study the feeding habits of dinosaurs and their close relatives, since it is one of the oldest ever found.
