= Sphaeriusoidea =

Scientific classification
- Kingdom: Animalia
- Phylum: Arthropoda
- Clade: Pancrustacea
- Class: Insecta
- Order: Coleoptera
- Suborder: Myxophaga
- Superfamily: Sphaeriusoidea; Erichson, 1845

Superfamily of beetles

Sphaeriusoidea is a superfamily of beetles in the suborder Myxophaga. It was first described 1845 by Erichson. There are 42 accepted species split between families.

== Families, subfamilies, and genera ==
Family: Hydroscaphidae

- Hydroscaphinae
  - Hydroscapha
- Leehermaniinae
  - Leehermania
- Triamyxinae
  - Triamyxa
- Not assigned to a subfamily
  - Scaphydra
  - Yara

Family: Sphaeriusidae

- Bezesporum
- Burmasporum
- Crowsonaerius
- Sphaerius

Family: Torridincolidae

- Deleveinae
  - Delevea
- Torridincolinae
  - Lapir
  - Torridincola
- Not assigned to a subfamily
  - Claudiella
  - Incoltorrida
  - Satonius
  - Ytu
