= List of species occurring in Britain at a single location =

The following is a list of native plant and animal species which are found in Britain, but only at a single location.

== Key ==
Key to conservation designations for species:

- RDB - Red Data Book with three subdivisions
  - (cr) - critically endangered
  - (en) - endangered
  - (vu) - vulnerable
- W&CA 8 - Schedule 8 of the Wildlife and Countryside Act 1981

Key to conservation designations for sites:

- NNR - national nature reserve
- SSSI - Site of Special Scientific Interest

== Currently found at just a single location ==
=== Non-vascular plants ===
Species	Conservation designation(s) of species	Location at which found	Conservation designation(s) of location	Date of discovery at this location	Formerly found elsewhere
Thamnobryum angustifolium, Derbyshire feathermoss	RDB (CR)	Derbyshire	SSSI	1886	No

=== Vascular plants ===
This section currently lists non-critical species and critical species in the smaller apomictic genera; many microspecies in the apomictic genera Hieracium (hawkweeds), Rubus (brambles) and Taraxacum (dandelions) are also found at just a single site each.

Species	Conservation designation(s) of species	Location at which found	Conservation designation(s) of location	Date of discovery at this location	Formerly found elsewhere
Diapensia Diapensia lapponica	RDB (vu), W&CA 8	Glenfinnan	None	1951	No
Rannoch-rush Scheuchzeria palustris	RDB (vu)	Rannoch Moor	SSSI, NNR	1910	Yes
Least adder's-tongue Ophioglossum lusitanicum	RDB (vu)	St Agnes, Isles of Scilly	SSSI	1950	No
Lundy cabbage Coincya wrightii	RDB (vu), W&CA 8	Lundy, Devon			No
Alpine rock-cress Arabis alpina	RDB (vu)	Isle of Skye			No
Bristol rock-cress Arabis scabra	RDB (vu), W&CA 8	Avon Gorge, Bristol			No
Lady's-slipper Cypripedium calceolus	RDB (cr), W&CA 8	Wharfedale			Yes
Shetland mouse-ear Cerastium nigrescens	RDB (vu)	Unst, Shetland		1837	No
Teesdale sandwort Minuartia stricta		Widdybank Fell, Teesdale			No
Wild cotoneaster Cotoneaster cambricus		Great Orme Head			No
Arran whitebeam Sorbus arranensis		Isle of Arran			No
Arran service-tree Sorbus pseudofennica		Isle of Arran			No
Catacol whitebeam Sorbus pseudomeinichii		Isle of Arran			No
Wilmott's whitebeam Sorbus willmottiana		Avon Gorge			No
Bristol whitebeam Sorbus bristoliensis		Avon Gorge			No
The sea-lavender Limonium paradoxum		St David's Head, Pembrokeshire			No
The sea-lavender Limonium transwallianum		Giltar Point, Pembrokeshire			No
The sea-lavender Limonium loganicum		Logan Rock to Carn Les Boel, Cornwall			No
The eyebright Euphrasia campbelliae		Isle of Lewis			No
Wall germander Teucrium chamaedrys		Beachy Head, Sussex			No
Leafless hawk's-beard Crepis praemorsa		Cumbria			No
Wood calamint Clinopodium menthifolium		Isle of Wight			No
Radnor lily Gagea bohemica		Radnorshire			No
Sand crocus Romulea columnae		Dawlish Warren			No
Strapwort Corrigiola litoralis		Slapton Ley, Devon			Yes
Creeping marshwort Apium repens		Port Meadow, Oxford			Yes
Fen ragwort Senecio paludosus		Ely			Yes
Holly-leaved Naiad Najas marina	RDB (vu)	Norfolk Broads		1883	Yes (fossil record)
Triangular club-rush Scirpus triqueter		Tamar Estuary, Devon			Yes

=== Invertebrates ===
Species	Conservation designation(s) of species	Location at which found	Conservation designation(s) of location	Date of discovery at this location	Formerly found elsewhere
Geotomus punctulatus – a shield bug	RDB1	Whitesand Bay, Sennen, Cornwall	none	1864	Yes
Syncopacma suecicella – a micro moth		Kynance Cove, Cornwall	SSSI	1984	No
Common forest looper (Pseudocoremia suavis)		Great Work, near Tregonning Hill, Breage, Cornwall	none	2007	No
Fisher’s estuarine moth (Gortyna borelii lunata)		Hamford Water, northeast Essex	SSSI		
Morris's wainscot (Chortodes morrisii morrisii)		west Dorset coast	SSSI		
Sphaerius acaroides – a sphaeriusid beetle		Eype Mouth, Dorset			No
Sitona gemellatus – a weevil		Eype Mouth, Dorset			Yes
Prostoma jenningsi – a ribbon worm		A lake between Croston and Bretherton, Lancashire		1967	No
Trembling sea mat (Victorella pavida)	Schedule 5 of the Wildlife and Countryside Act 1981 and Species Action Plan	Swanpool, Falmouth	SSSI and LNR	1968	Yes
Megathiris detruncata – a lamp shell		35 fathom mark off Men-a-vaur, Isles of Scilly		1888	No
Ivell's sea anemone (Edwardsia ivelli)	Schedule 5 of the Wildlife and Countryside Act 1981	Widewater Lagoon, West Sussex		1975	No

=== Vertebrates ===
==== Birds ====
Species	Conservation designation(s) of species	Location at which found	Conservation designation(s) of location	Date of discovery at this location	Formerly found elsewhere
Common crane (Grus grus) (see note 1)	RDB	The Norfolk Broads		1979	Yes

===== Notes =====
1. Common crane, although occurring in fluctuating numbers as a scarce spring and autumn migrant through Britain, with occasional individuals or pairs wintering or summering, has only established a single breeding population, in the Norfolk Broads (see Cranes in Britain for more details); the species was thought to be quite widespread in the Middle Ages, but the term 'crane' was also often applied to grey heron, making a reliable determination of historical status difficult.
