= Ytu cleideae =

Scientific classification
- Domain: Eukaryota
- Kingdom: Animalia
- Phylum: Arthropoda
- Class: Insecta
- Order: Coleoptera
- Family: Torridincolidae
- Genus: Ytu
- Species: Y. cleideae

Binomial name
- Ytu cleideae Vanin, 1991

Species of beetle

Ytu cleideae is a species of myxophagan beetle in the genus Ytu. It was discovered in 1991.
