= Ytu brutus =

Scientific classification
- Domain: Eukaryota
- Kingdom: Animalia
- Phylum: Arthropoda
- Class: Insecta
- Order: Coleoptera
- Family: Torridincolidae
- Genus: Ytu
- Species: Y. brutus

Binomial name
- Ytu brutus Spangler, 1980

Species of beetle

Ytu brutus is a species of myxophagan beetle in the genus Ytu. It was described by Paul J. Spangler in 1980 and is endemic to Mato Grosso, Brazil. The specific name refers to a line from Julius Caesar by William Shakespeare ("et tu, Brute?").
