= Delevea bertrandi =

Scientific classification
- Kingdom: Animalia
- Phylum: Arthropoda
- Class: Insecta
- Order: Coleoptera
- Family: Torridincolidae
- Genus: Delevea
- Species: D. bertrandi

Binomial name
- Delevea bertrandi Reichardt, 1976

Species of beetle

Delevea bertrandi is a species of myxophagan beetles in the genus Delevea belonging to the family Torridincolidae It is known from Southern Africa and was originally described by Reichardt in 1976. The genus Delevea comprises aquatic beetles typically found in mossy, humid environments. These beetles are considered rare and understudied. Species in this genus have been included in biodiversity surveys and checklists across Southern Africa. Additional taxonomic features are listed on the Encyclopedia of Life.
