= Ytu mirandus =

Scientific classification
- Domain: Eukaryota
- Kingdom: Animalia
- Phylum: Arthropoda
- Class: Insecta
- Order: Coleoptera
- Family: Torridincolidae
- Genus: Ytu
- Species: Y. mirandus

Binomial name
- Ytu mirandus Reichardt & Vanin, 1977

Species of beetle

Ytu mirandus is a species of myxophagan beetle in the genus Ytu. It was discovered in 1977.
