= Sphaerius africanus =

Scientific classification
- Domain: Eukaryota
- Kingdom: Animalia
- Phylum: Arthropoda
- Class: Insecta
- Order: Coleoptera
- Family: Sphaeriusidae
- Genus: Sphaerius
- Species: S. africanus

Binomial name
- Sphaerius africanus Endrödy-Younga

Species of beetle

Sphaerius africanus is a species of beetle in the family Sphaeriusidae, discovered in 1997 by Sebastian Endrödy-Younga, being native to South America and having one synonym, Microsporus africanus.
