= Natans =

Natans may refer to:

- Aponogeton natans, species of aquatic plant in the family Aponogetonaceae
- Atractus natans, species of snake in the family Colubridae
- Bigelowiella natans, species of alga in the family Chlorarachniaceae
- Bryaninops natans, species of marine fish in the family Gobiidae
- Caltha natans, species of flowering plant in the family Ranunculaceae
- Crassula natans, commonly known as floating pigmyweed, is a herb in the family Crassulaceae
- Haloplanus natans, halophilic Archaeon in the family Halobacteriaceae
- Hydroscapha natans, species of skiff beetle in the family Hydroscaphidae
- Potamogeton natans, aquatic species in the family Potamogetonaceae
- Sagittaria natans, species of flowering aquatic plant in the family Alismataceae
- Salvinia natans, species of annual floating aquatic fern in the family Salviniaceae
- Sargassum natans, species of brown algae in the family Sargassaceae
- Sparganium natans, species of bur-reed in the family Typhaceae
- Sphaerotilus natans, aquatic periphyton bacterial organism in the family Comamonadaceae
- Typhlonectes natans, species of caecilian in the family Typhlonectidae
