= Ytu artemis =

Scientific classification
- Domain: Eukaryota
- Kingdom: Animalia
- Phylum: Arthropoda
- Class: Insecta
- Order: Coleoptera
- Family: Torridincolidae
- Genus: Ytu
- Species: Y. artemis

Binomial name
- Ytu artemis Reichardt, 1973

Species of beetle

Ytu artemis is a species of myxophagan beetle in the genus Ytu. It was discovered in 1973 and named after the Greek goddess Artemis.
