= Ytu cuyaba =

Scientific classification
- Domain: Eukaryota
- Kingdom: Animalia
- Phylum: Arthropoda
- Class: Insecta
- Order: Coleoptera
- Family: Torridincolidae
- Genus: Ytu
- Species: Y. cuyaba

Binomial name
- Ytu cuyaba Reichardt & Vanin, 1977

Species of beetle

Ytu cuyaba is a species of myxophagan beetle in the genus Ytu. It was discovered in 1977.
