= Eype Mouth =

Sea cliff beak in Dorset, England

Coordinates: 50.7156°N 2.7832°W

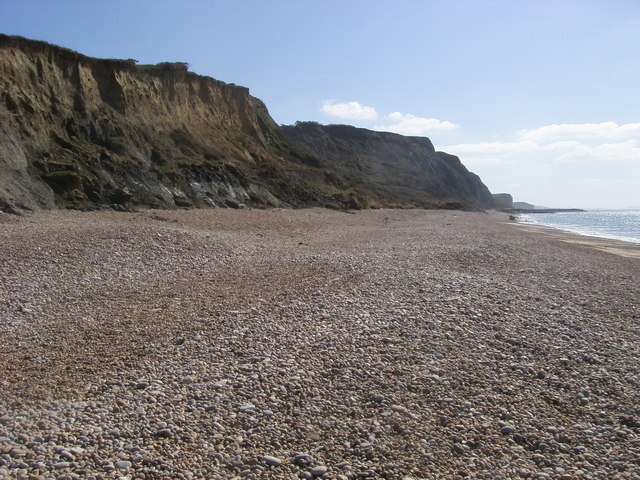
Eype Mouth

Eype Mouth is a natural break in a line of sea cliffs on the Jurassic Coast World Heritage Site in west Dorset on the south coast of England. The small River Eype drains into the sea at this point. Eype means 'a steep place' in Old English. The village of Eype (divided into the settlements Lower and Higher Eype) lies just upstream of the rivermouth, which is reached by a single narrow lane which runs down through Lower Eype to a shingle beach with car park.

The coast to the west of the rivermouth is a noted site for rare beetles. Two species found here are unknown elsewhere in Great Britain:

- Sphaerius acaroides lives in mud and around plant roots at the edge of standing freshwater pools on the site; this species is particularly noteworthy in that it is the only British representative of the suborder Myxophaga.
- the weevil Sitona gemellatus occurs on the site, being found at the roots of leguminous plants (although this species has been recorded in similar habitat at Sidmouth, Devon, it has not been recorded from there recently).

Other rare beetles found at this site include the tiger beetle Cicindela germanica, the ground beetle Drypta dentata and the weevil Baris analis.
