= YTU =

YTU may refer to:

- Yıldız Technical University in Istanbul, Turkey
- Yangon Technological University in Yangon, Myanmar
- Ytu (beetle), a genus of beetles
