= Sphaerius martini =

Sphaerius martini Temporal range: Cenomanian

Scientific classification
- Kingdom: Animalia
- Phylum: Arthropoda
- Class: Insecta
- Order: Coleoptera
- Family: Sphaeriusidae
- Genus: Sphaerius
- Species: †S. martini

Binomial name
- †Sphaerius martini Li and Cai, 2023

Extinct species of beetle

Sphaerius martini is an extinct species of beetle in the family Sphaeriusidae that lived during the Cenomanian stage of the Late Cretaceous epoch. The holotype measures about 0.6 mm (0.024 in) in length and 0.44 mm (0.017 in) in width.

== Distribution ==
Sphaerius martini is known from fossilised specimens found in Burmese amber.
