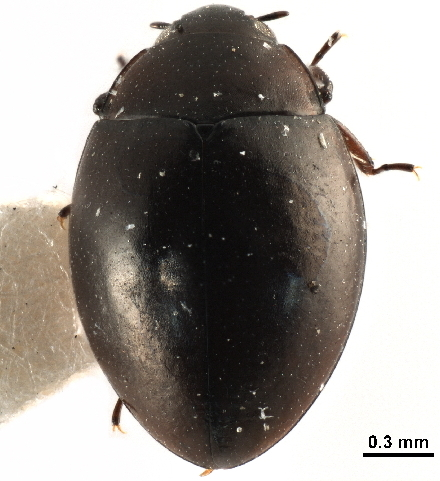
- Specimen of S. kurosawai

Scientific classification
- Kingdom: Animalia
- Phylum: Arthropoda
- Clade: Pancrustacea
- Class: Insecta
- Order: Coleoptera
- Superfamily: Sphaeriusoidea
- Family: Torridincolidae
- Genus: Satonius; Endrödy-Younga, 1997

Type species
- Satonius kurosawai (Sato, 1982)

= Satonius =

Satonius kurosawai

Genus of beetles

Satonius is a genus of beetles in the family Torridincolidae. It is native to East Asia. The type species, S. kurosawai, was originally described as a species of Delevea. Several other species have been described since.

== Species ==
- Satonius cheni Liang, Jiang, Bergsten, Jia, Ge, 2024
- Satonius fui Hájek, Yoshitomi, Fikáček, Hayashi & Jia, 2011
- Satonius jaechi Hájek, Yoshitomi, Fikáček, Hayashi & Jia, 2011
- Satonius kurosawai Satô, 1982
- Satonius nigriventralis Liang, Jiang, Bergsten, Jia, Ge, 2024
- Satonius panghongae Liang, Jiang, Bergsten, Jia, Ge, 2024
- Satonius quzhouensis Liang, Jiang, Bergsten, Jia, Ge, 2024
- Satonius schoenmanni Hájek & Fikáček, 2008
- Satonius stysi Hájek & Fikáček, 2008
- Satonius wangi Hájek & Fikáček, 2008
- Satonius xinhuiensis Liang, Jiang, Bergsten, Jia, Ge, 2024
- Satonius zhangi Liang, Jiang, Bergsten, Jia, Ge, 2024
- Satonius zhenhuai Liang, Jiang, Bergsten, Jia, Ge, 2024
