= Delevea namibensis =

Scientific classification
- Domain: Eukaryota
- Kingdom: Animalia
- Phylum: Arthropoda
- Class: Insecta
- Order: Coleoptera
- Family: Torridincolidae
- Genus: Delevea
- Species: D. namibensis

Binomial name
- Delevea namibensis Endrödy-Younga, 1997

Species of beetle

Delevea namibensis is a species of beetles in the genus Delevea.
