= Hephaestus (disambiguation) =

Hephaestus is a Greek god.

Hephaestus may also refer to:

== Arts and entertainment ==
- Hephaestus (album), a 1993 album by Iceburn
- Hephaestus (DC Comics), a cosmic entity
- Hephaestus (Marvel Comics)
- Hephaestus, the eighth level of the video game BioShock

== Other uses ==
- Hephaestus, Egypt, a town in Roman Egypt known only from ecclesiastical sources
- MT Hephaestus, an oil tanker that ran aground in Malta
- Hephaestus (fish) a genus of fish
- Ytu hephaestus, a species of myxophagan beetle in the genus Ytu
- 2212 Hephaistos, an asteroid and near-Earth object
