= Hydroscapha monticola =

Scientific classification
- Kingdom: Animalia
- Phylum: Arthropoda
- Class: Insecta
- Order: Coleoptera
- Family: Hydroscaphidae
- Genus: Hydroscapha
- Species: H. monticola

Binomial name
- Hydroscapha monticola Löbl, 1996

Species of beetle

Hydroscapha monticola is a species of skiff beetle native to India and Sri Lanka.
