= Ytu hephaestus =

Scientific classification
- Domain: Eukaryota
- Kingdom: Animalia
- Phylum: Arthropoda
- Class: Insecta
- Order: Coleoptera
- Family: Torridincolidae
- Genus: Ytu
- Species: Y. hephaestus

Binomial name
- Ytu hephaestus Reichardt, 1973

Species of beetle

Ytu hephaestus is a species of myxophagan beetle belonging to the genus Ytu. It was first described in 1973.
