= Hydroscapha jaechi =

Scientific classification
- Kingdom: Animalia
- Phylum: Arthropoda
- Class: Insecta
- Order: Coleoptera
- Family: Hydroscaphidae
- Genus: Hydroscapha
- Species: H. jaechi

Binomial name
- Hydroscapha jaechi Löbl, 1994

Species of beetle

Hydroscapha jaechi is a species of skiff beetle endemic to Sri Lanka.

== Description ==
This tiny species has a length of fore body about 0.66 to 0.72 mm. Postero-median projection of the sternite VII is irregular, long and very narrow. Chaetotaxy with two tufts in Sternite V. Posterior margin of the Sternite V is weakly sinuate. In female, Sternite VI is trilobate in shape apically and the lateral margin of lateral lobes is convex. In male, aedeagus is angulate at dorsal face and laterally straight but not gradually narrowing apically.
