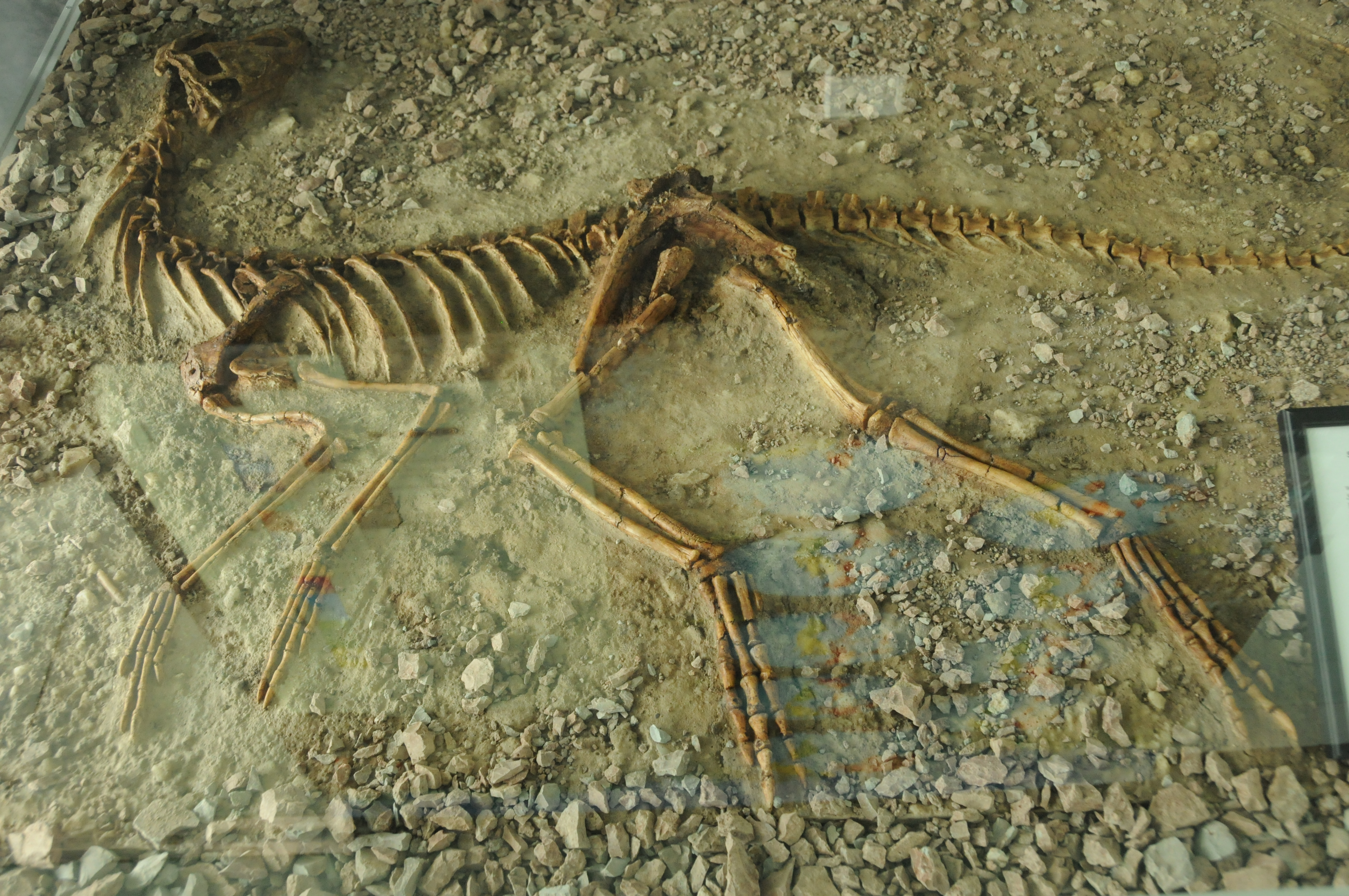
- Reconstructed skeleton

Scientific classification
- Kingdom: Animalia
- Phylum: Chordata
- Class: Reptilia
- Clade: Dinosauria (?)
- Clade: †Ornithischia (?)
- Family: †Silesauridae
- Clade: †Sulcimentisauria
- Genus: †Silesaurus; Dzik, 2003

Species
- S. opolensis Dzik, 2003 (type)

= Silesaurus =

Silesaurus Temporal range: Late Triassic, Carnian

Extinct genus of reptiles

Silesaurus is a genus of silesaurid dinosauriform from the Late Triassic, of what is now Poland.

== Discovery and naming ==
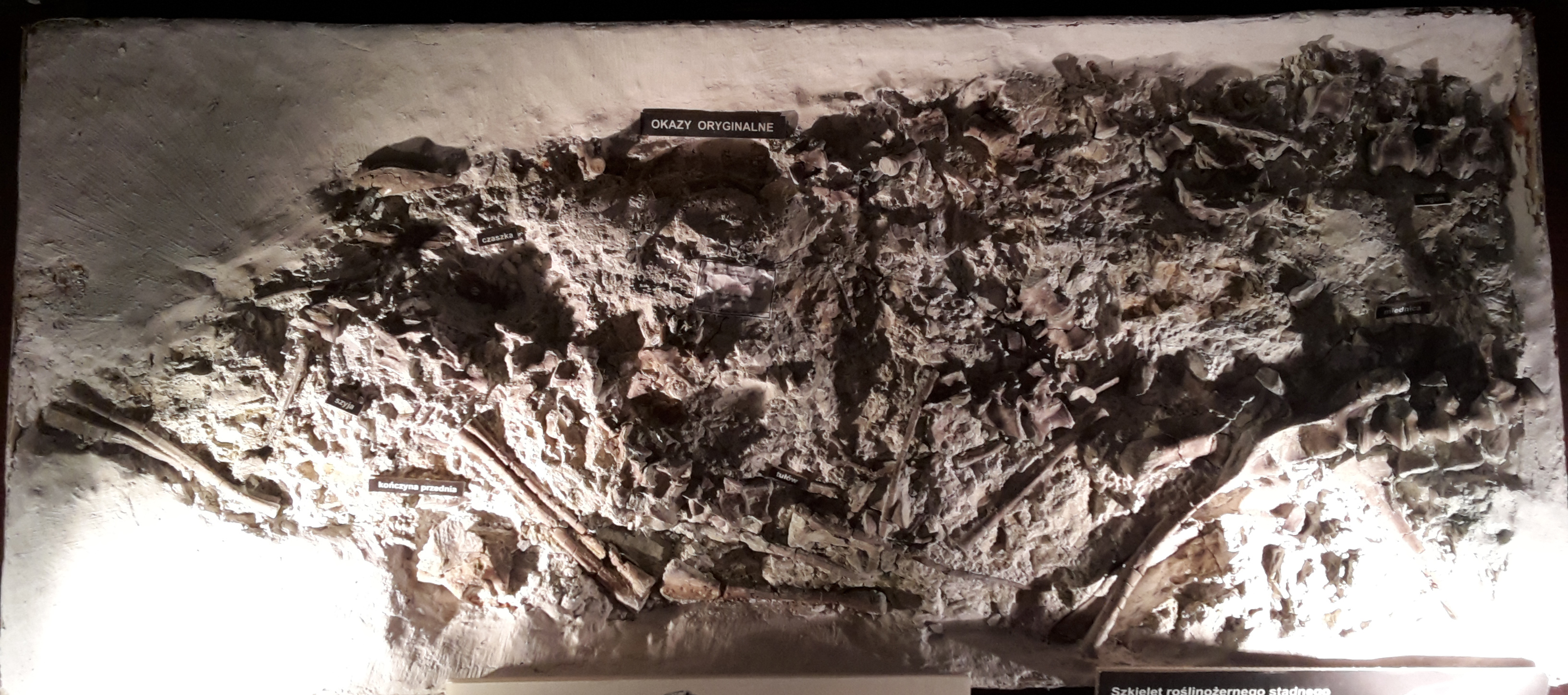
Holotype ZPAL Ab III/361, Museum of Evolution of Polish Academy of Sciences

The Krasiejów claypit near Opole, Poland, was first discovered as a fossil locality in the 1980s after quarrying for a nearby cement plant reached the fossil layer, though scientific excavations began in 1993 with the discovery of an almost complete phytosaur skull by Polish paleontologist Jerzy Dzik. Preliminary investigations identified Krasiejów as a diverse vertebrate assemblage, named the "Paleorhinus fauna", preserving partially articulated skeletons of amphibians and reptiles, including possible early dinosaurs from the middle to late Carnian. Following these preliminary reports, extensive excavations of Krasiejów were undertaken from 2000 to 2002, collecting numerous skulls, partially articulated skeletons, and isolated remains. An area with dense skeletons was left intact to construct a museum exhibit of the University of Opole around, allowing viewing of the preparation and excavations of material. From the upper of the fossil layers, nearly 400 bones of a single taxon originally identified as an early dinosaur were collected, including four partially articulated skeletons of individuals. One of these, ZPAL Ab III/361, including a partial skull and most of the skeleton, was chosen by Dzik to be the holotype of the new taxon he named Silesaurus opolensis. While some specimens had at first been thought to have belonged to a herrerasaurid or relative, Dzik revised his classification believing Silesaurus to be close to the origins of dinosaurs, either as an early ornithischian, an early member close to Ornithischia and Sauropodomorpha, or a closely related non-dinosaur showing similar adaptations for herbivory.

== Description ==
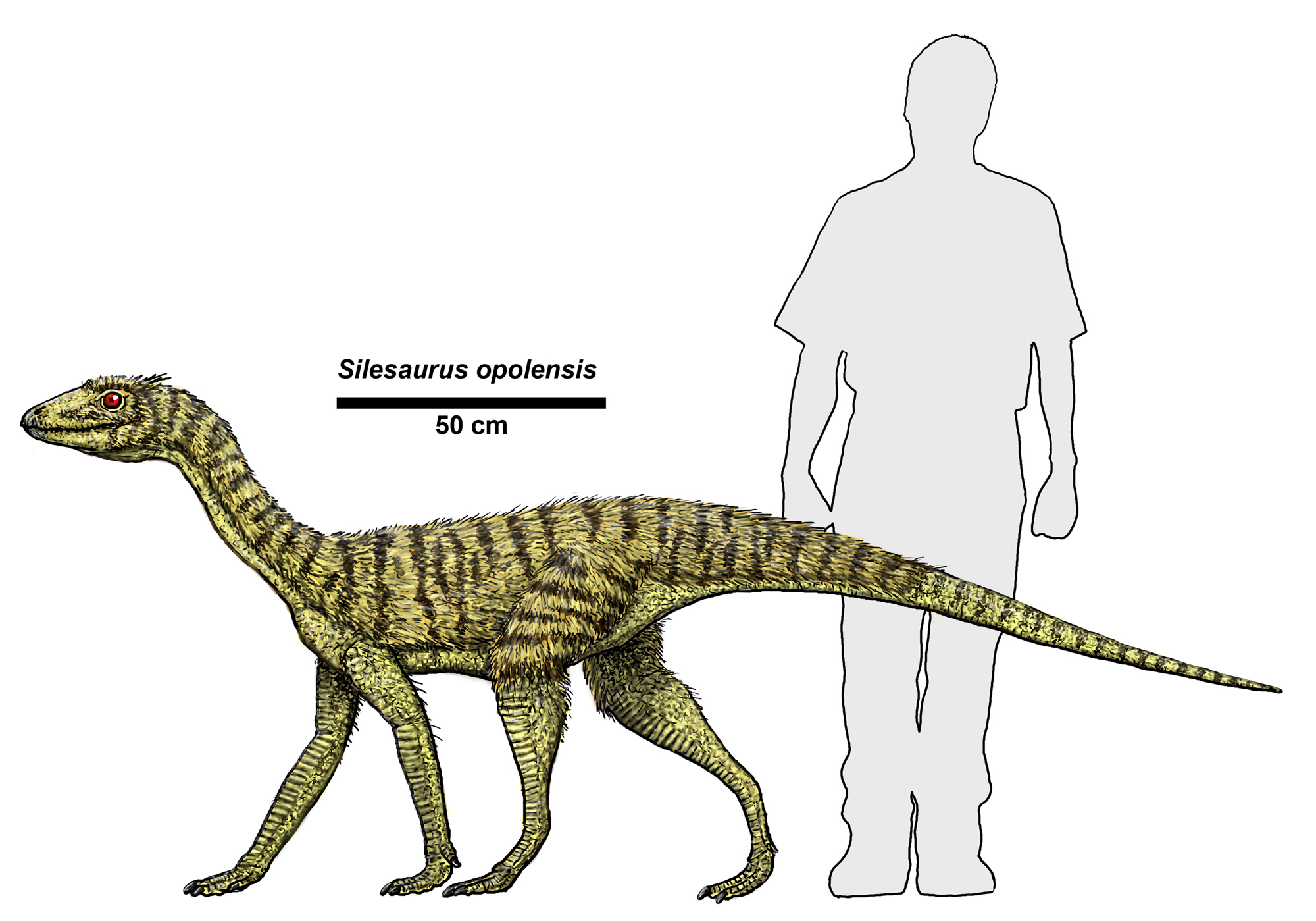
Life restoration with protofeathers and a human for scale

Silesaurus measured approximately 2.3 meters (7.5 feet) in length. Lightly built, it was probably a fast and agile animal with an active lifestyle. The snout was narrow with forward-pointing nostrils, and the large orbits likely provided Silesaurus with acute vision.

Initially, Silesaurus was thought to be strictly herbivorous, but later research on coprolite contents indicates that it may have been insectivorous, feeding on insects such as the beetle Triamyxa. The teeth of the animal were small, conical, and serrated, and were distributed irregularly in its jaws. The tip of the dentary had no teeth, and evidence suggests that it was covered by a keratinous beak.

== Classification ==
One hypothesis argues that Silesaurus was not a true dinosaur, but rather a dinosauriform. Dinosaurian features lacking in Silesaurus include an enlarged deltopectoral crest (a muscle attachment on the humerus), and epipophyses (enlarged tendon attachment above the postzygapophysis) on the cervical vertebrae.

However, Silesaurus has some dinosaurian characteristics as well:

- a brevis shelf (a bone surface on the ilium that functions as an attachment site for tail muscles)
- ischium with a slender shaft
- femur with a reduced tuberosity that borders the ligament of the femoral head
- a prominent lesser trochanter
- an overlap of the ascending process of the astragalus with the tibia
- a concave proximal articular surface for the reception of the distal end of the fibula on the calcaneum

As a result, alternative hypotheses place Silesaurus at or near the base of the ornithischian dinosaurs. Other scientists propose a basal link between the basal sauropodomorphs and ornithischians.

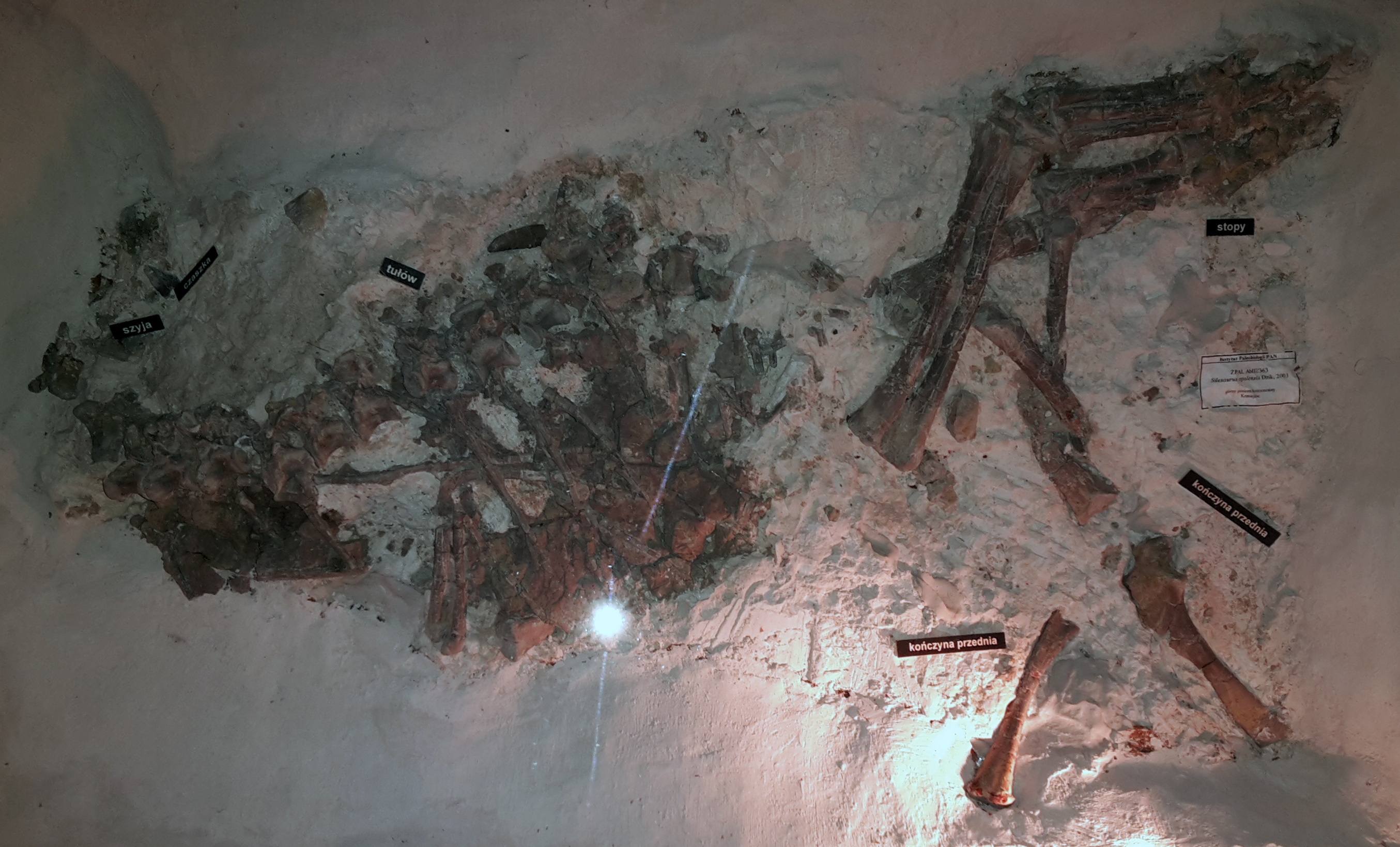
Referred specimen ZPAL Ab III/364

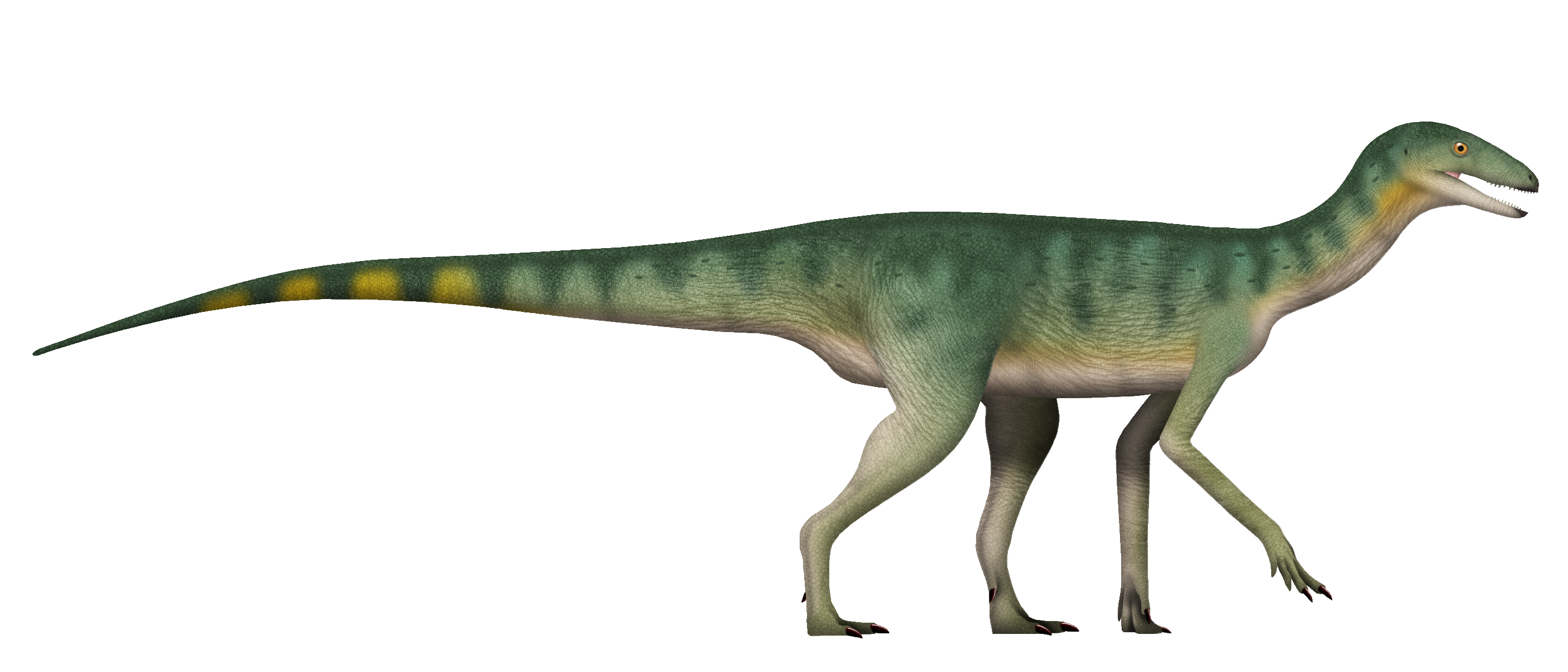
Life restoration with scales

Systematic position after Nesbitt (2011):

- Ornithodira
  - Pterosauromorpha
    - Scleromochlus
    - Pterosauria
  - Dinosauromorpha
    - Lagerpetidae
      - Lagerpeton
      - Dromomeron
    - Dinosauriformes
      - Marasuchus
      - - Silesauridae
          - Lewisuchus/Pseudolagosuchus
          - - Asilisaurus
            - - Eucoelophysis
              - - Sacisaurus
                - Silesaurus
        - Dinosauria
          - Saurischia
            - Theropoda
            - Sauropodomorpha
          - Ornithischia

== Palaeobiology ==
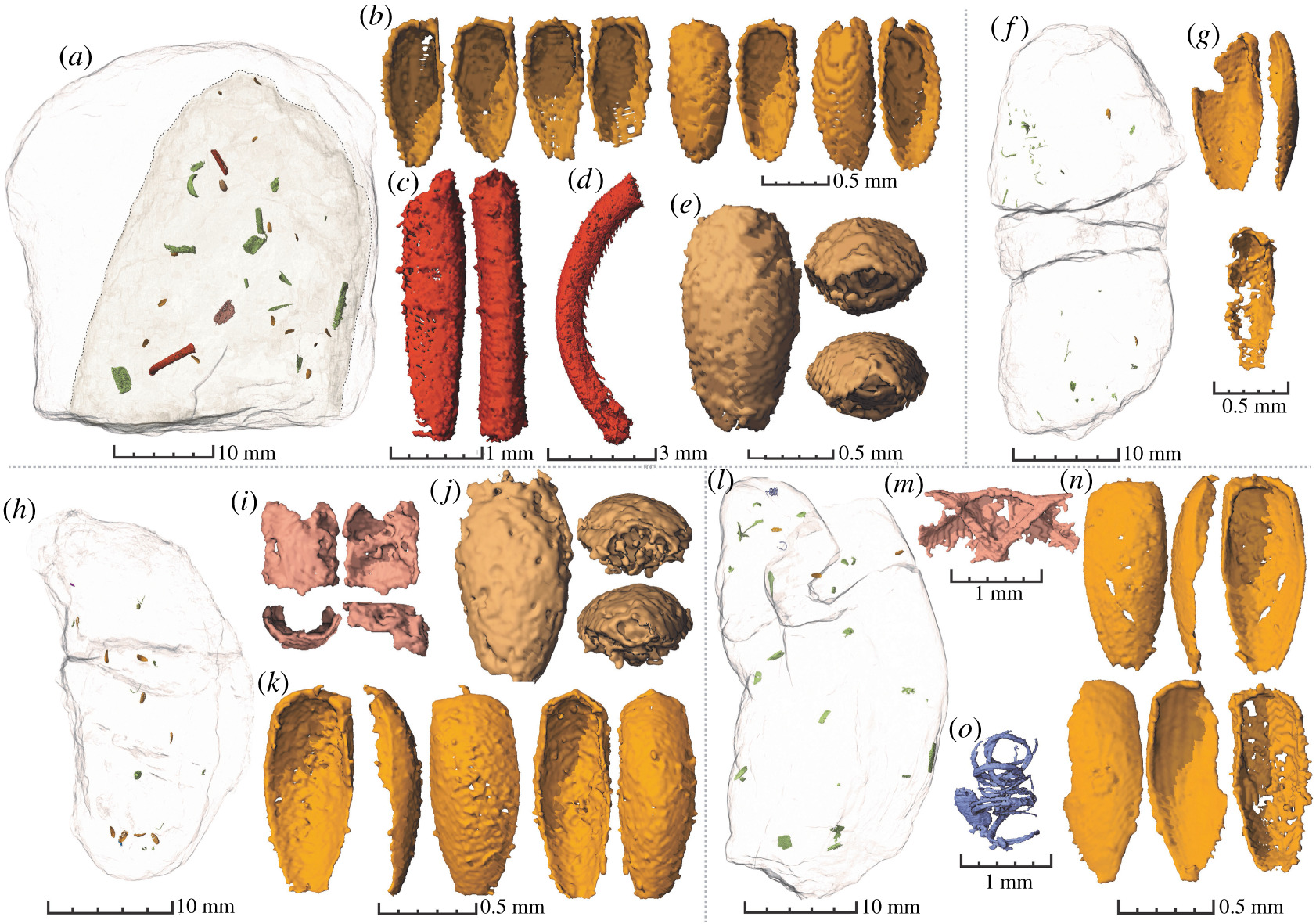
Coprolites assigned to Silesaurus which contain beetle remains

=== Diet ===
Herbivory has been suggested for silesaurids in general and Silesaurus in particular based on tooth shape, and a 2014 study by the paleontologists Tai Kubo and Mugino O. Kubo of microwear on its teeth found it consistent with herbivory on soft objects, by comparing with wear on the teeth of extant mammals, though omnivory could not be ruled out.

A 2019 study by paleontologist Martin Qvarnström and colleagues examining coprolites (fossil dung) that contained beetles attributed them to Silesaurus based on size and other factors. These researchers suggested that while Silesaurus could exploit plant resources, it was not strictly a plant-eater. They pointed out that the teeth of Silesaurus were not numerous or regularly spaced, and lacked the coarse serrations typical in herbivores. They hypothesized that the beak-like jaws were adapted for pecking small insects off the ground like modern birds. They cautioned that there could have been other food sources that were not preserved in the coprolites, such as soft prey, plant fragments, and larger, more resistant items that were regurgitated, and that beetles could have been a seasonal food item. If so, this would represent the earliest known occurrence of this highly derived mode of feeding and have implications for the understanding of the evolutionary adaptations that would eventually lead up to the origin of dinosaurs.

=== Locomotion ===
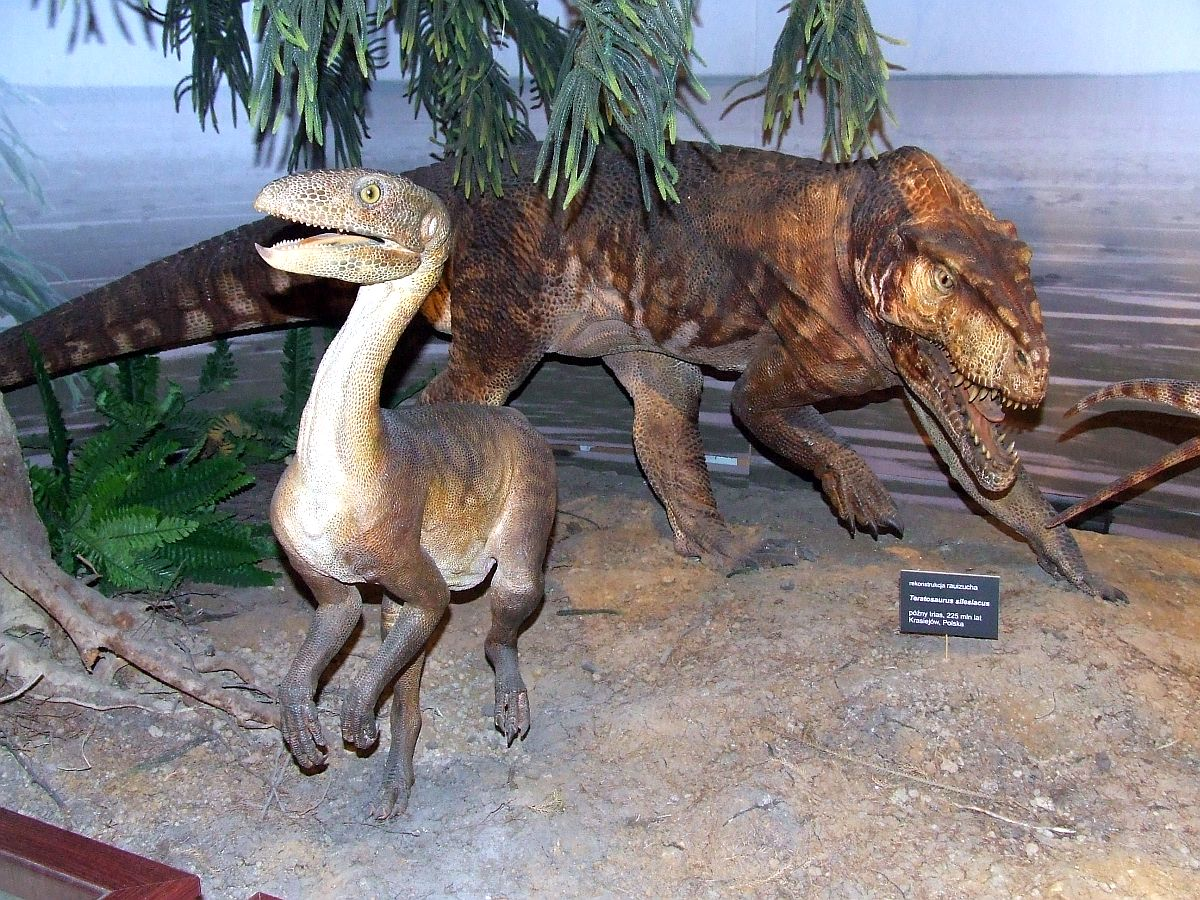
A diorama at the Museum of Evolution of Polish Academy of Sciences, showing Silesaurus in a bipedal stance, running away from Polonosuchus

Silesaurus and silesaurids in general are often considered quadrupeds, walking on all four legs thanks to their long, gracile forelimbs. There is debate over whether they were capable of bipedalism (walking on only the hindlimbs) in some circumstances.

In 2010, the paleontologists Rafał Piechowski and Jerzy Dzik considered such lengthy forelimbs typical of fast-running, quadrupedal animals. They also argued that Silesaurus retained the ability for fast bipedal running, since the forelimbs were lightweight and the long tail may have acted as a counterweight to the body. Conversely, Kubo & Kubo (2012) estimated that Silesaurus had a low top speed, akin to large Triassic sauropodomorphs, based on its relatively short metatarsal III. They also identified it as the most quadrupedal avemetatarsalian in their sample, based on its long forelimbs.

Piechowski and the paleontologist Mateusz Tałanda concluded in 2020 that the short hindlimbs combined with the elongated forelimbs supported the idea that it was an obligate (permanent) quadruped. The forelimbs had reduced musculature but were capable of a sturdy erect posture with the hands fully pronated (palm down, fingers forwards). They were similar to the forelimbs of early sauropods, though with greater relative stride length due to a longer ulna and radius. The hindlimbs have a narrow gait, a pillar-erect hip joint similar to "rauisuchians", and strong, efficient muscles which may have been adapted to support its weight or flee from predators. Silesaurid trackmakers may be a good fit for Atreipus footprints.

Grinham et al. (2019) estimated that Silesaurus was a facultative (occasional) biped based on its position on the archosaur family tree. Pintore et al. (2021) found that the femur shape of Silesaurus overlapped with fully bipedal archosaurs rather than with quadrupeds. The same analysis classified Asilisaurus as a quadruped. The authors acknowledged that their study does not differentiate facultative from obligate bipeds, and that a larger set of anatomical factors may be necessary to understand its preferred method of locomotion.

== Palaeoenvironment ==
Silesaurus lived in a subtropical environment similar to the modern Mediterranean basin with alternating summer monsoons and dry winters. The animal shared its environment of extensive swamplands and fern vegetation with a wealth of invertebrates as well as dipnoan and ganoid fishes, temnospondyls, phytosaurs and early pterosaurs.
