= Museum of Evolution of Polish Academy of Sciences =

Science Museum in Warsaw, Poland

Coordinates: 52°13′54″N 21°00′23″E

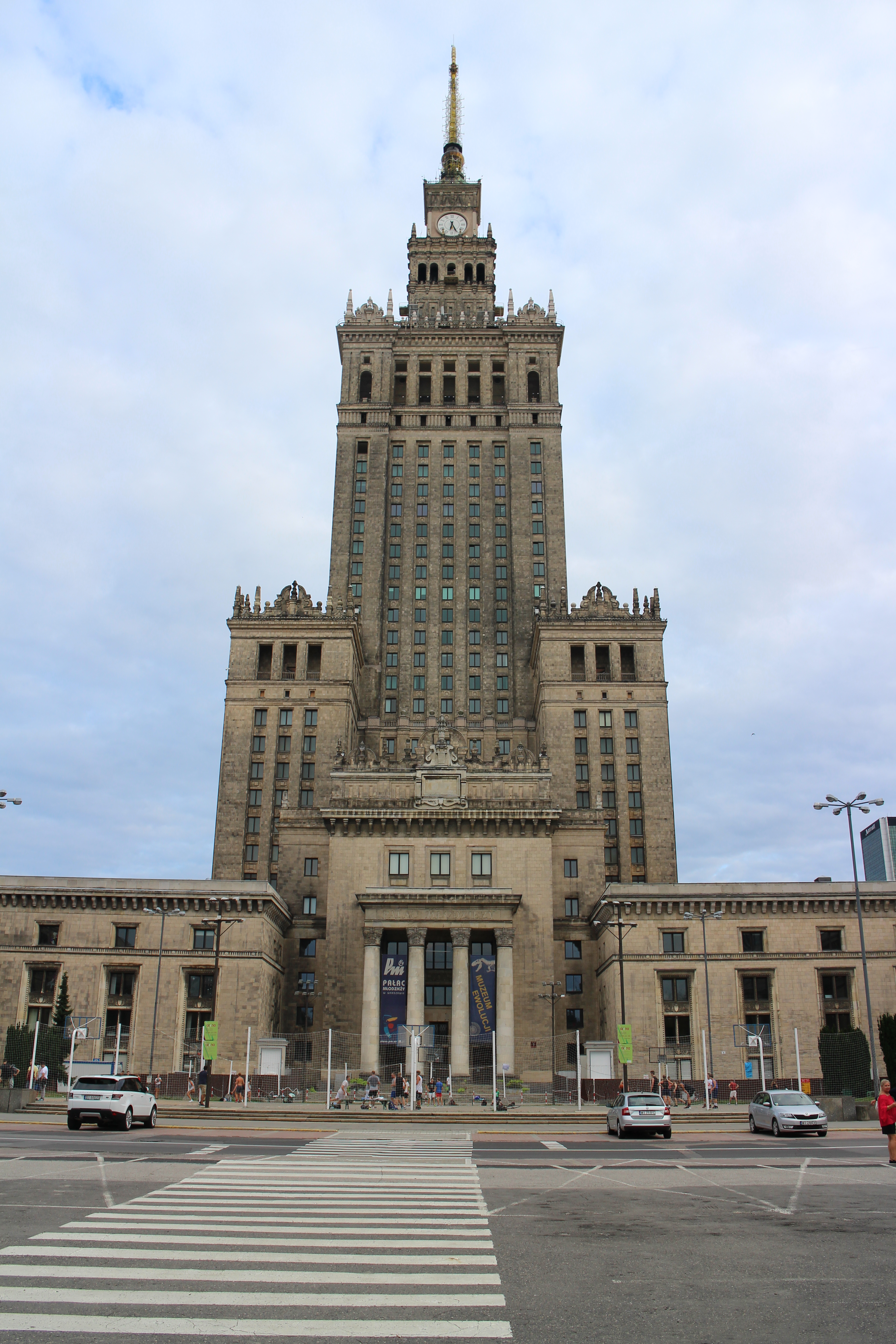
Entrance

The Museum of Evolution of Polish Academy of Sciences (Polish: Muzeum Ewolucji Instytutu Paleobiologii Polskiej Akademii Nauk) is the display area of the natural history museum in Warsaw, Poland. It is the public front of the Muzeum i Instytut Zoologii or Zoology Museum and the Instytut Paleobiologii or Paleobiology Institute. It is based at the Palace of Culture and Science.

== History ==
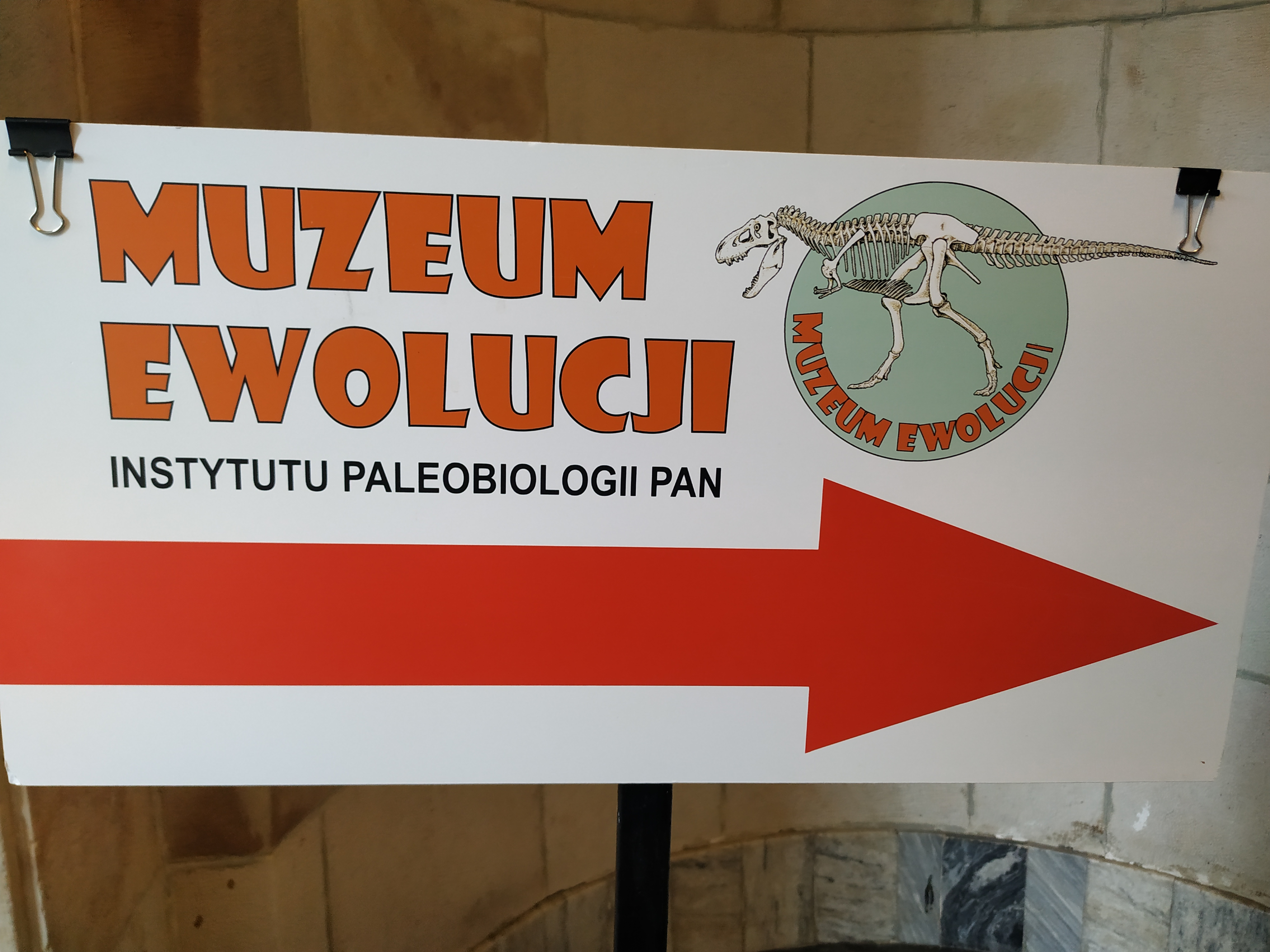
Entrance of the Museum of Evolution

In the halls of the Palace of Culture and Science in Warsaw, professor Zofia Kielan-Jaworowska organised an exhibition named "Dinosaurs of the Gobi Desert" in 1968. It was open until 1984 and featured the discoveries of Polish-Mongolian palaeontological missions to the Gobi Desert.

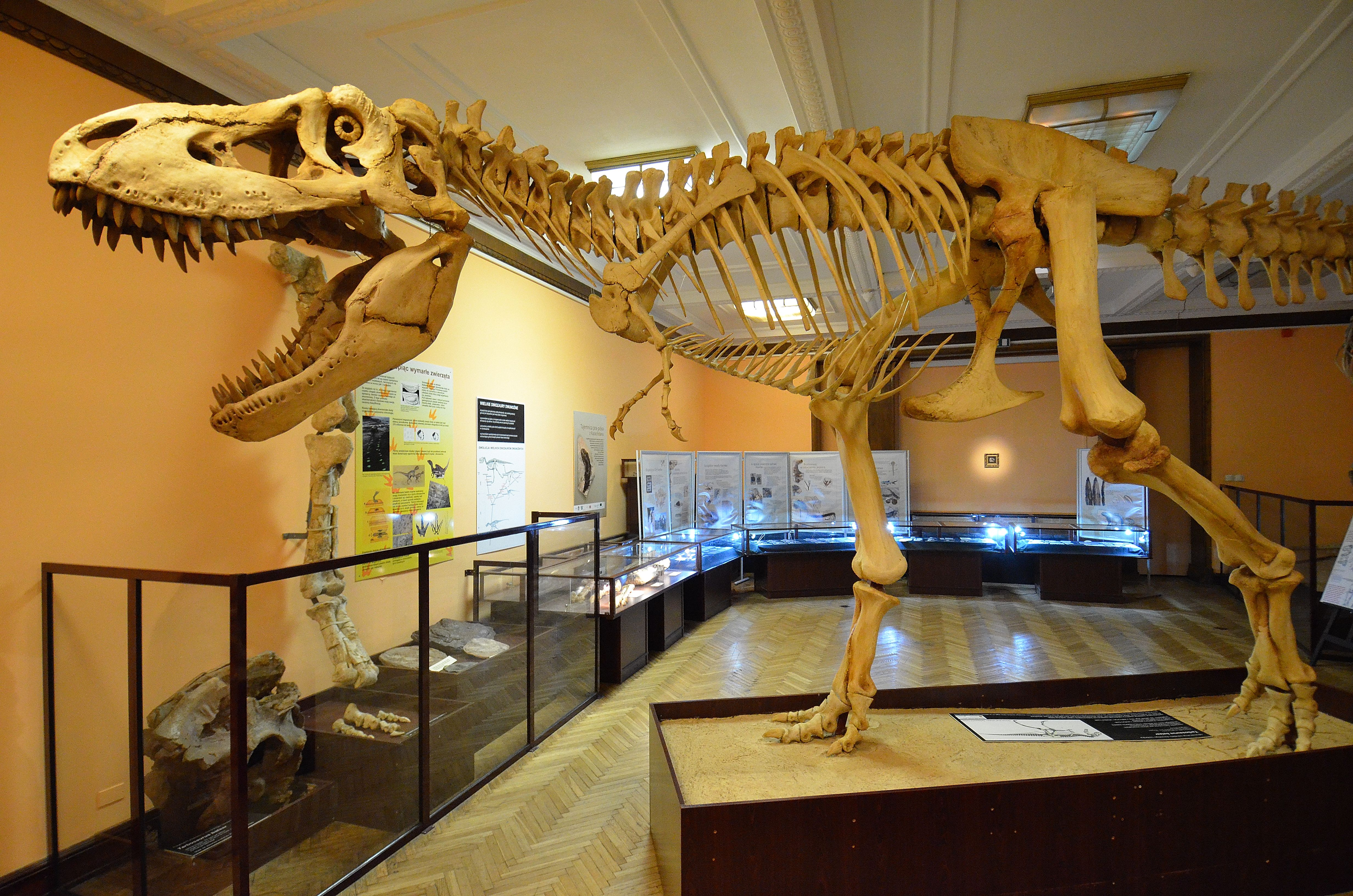
Tarbosaurus bataar skeletal reconstruction

The Museum of Evolution was founded in 1984 when the Institute of Paleobiology took over the exhibition halls that the Institute of Zoology, Polish Academy of Sciences, had been using in the Youth Palace (a section of the Palace of Culture of Science). The public was first given access to the "Evolution on Land" permanent exhibition in 1985, which was created by Zofia Kielan-Jaworowska with support from Andrzej Sulimski and a group from the Institute of Paleobiology. Many specimens gathered during the excursions to Mongolia were on display in the show. A section of the exhibit was also devoted to contemporary creatures, especially insects and birds, with specimens from the Institute and Museum of Zoology's collections on display.

A new display showcasing the Late Triassic amphibians and reptiles found in Krasiejów close to Opole opened in 2001. Both actual fossil material from the Krasiejów site and life-size replicas of both terrestrial and aquatic species discovered there are included in the display.

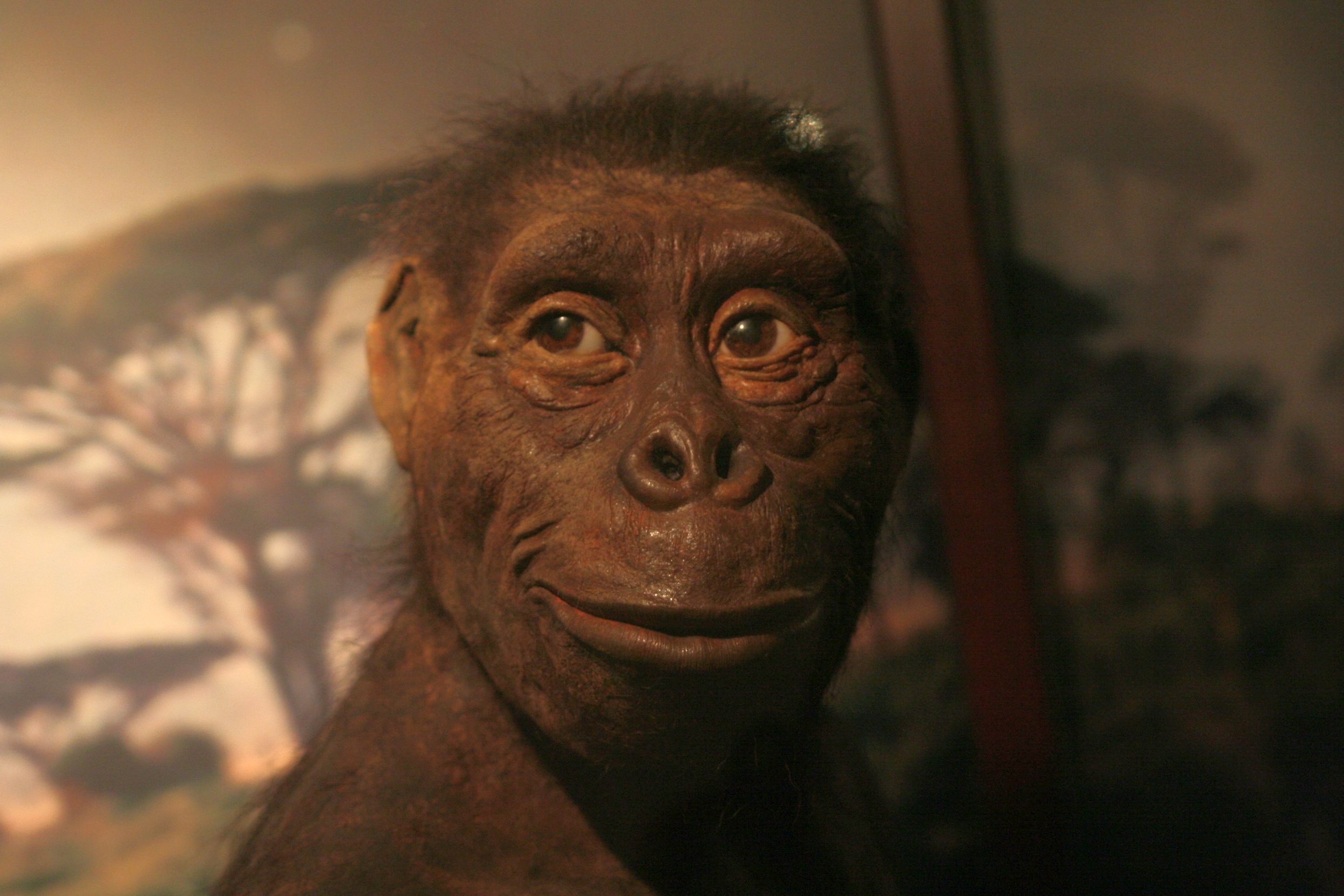
"Lucy" Australopithecus life reconstruction

A life reconstruction of the Australopithecus specimen "Lucy" was added to the museum's anthropology section in 2003.

The Museum of Evolution's gallery underwent additional development in 2005. The two new skeletal reconstructions of the Mongolian dinosaurs Tarbosaurus bataar and Opisthocoelicaudia skarzynskii, based on the most recent scientific knowledge of their anatomy, were among the notable contributions.

In 2009, to commemorate the 150th anniversary of the publication of Charles Darwin's On the Origin of Species, the permanent exhibition of the Museum of Evolution was substantially expanded.

== Permanent Exhibition ==
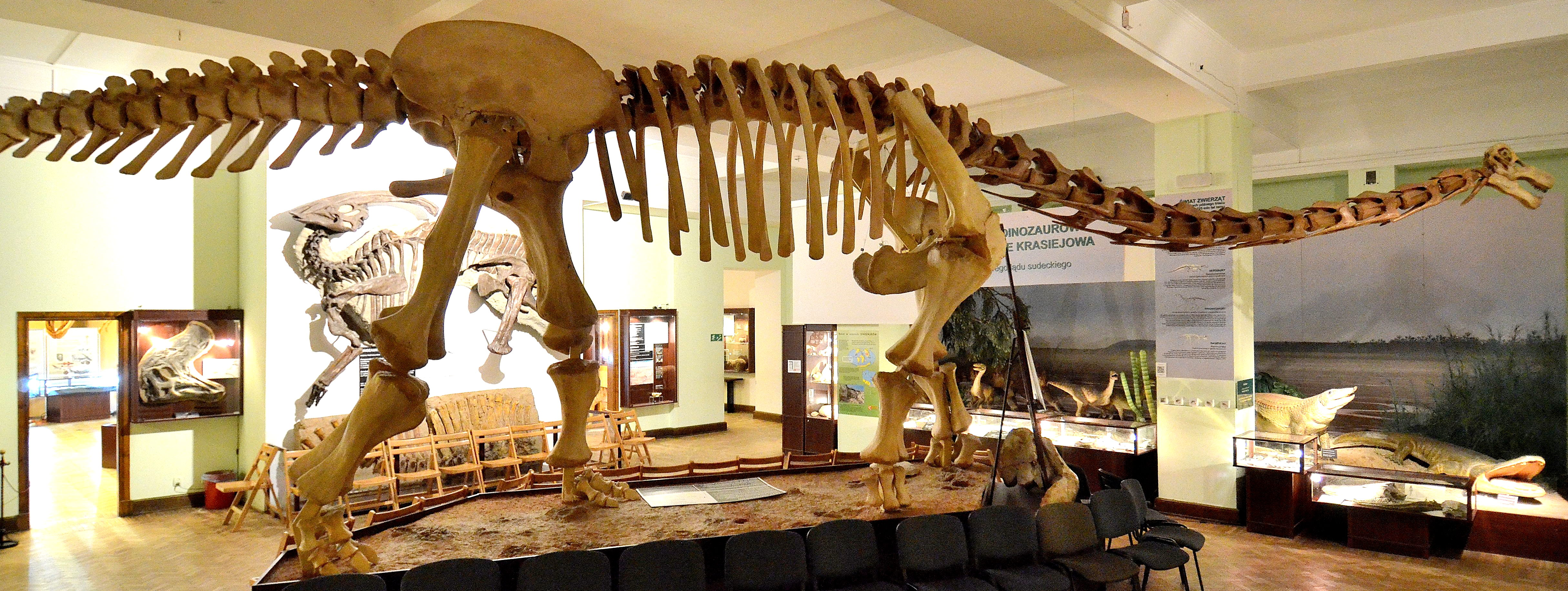
Opisthocoelicaudia skarzynskii skeletal reconstruction in the main exhibition hall

The majority of the exhibit's dinosaur skeletons were discovered during Polish-Mongolian expeditions to the Gobi Desert in the 1960s and 1970s under the direction of Zofia Kielan-Jaworowska. The gigantic skeletal replica of the sauropod dinosaur Opisthocoelicaudia fills practically the whole main exhibition hall at the Museum of Evolution. Nemegtosaurus, a separate sauropod dinosaur from the Gobi, whose skull was put on this skeletal reconstruction, was discovered a few kilometres from Opisthocoelicaudia skeleton. However, other palaeontologists claim that the skull and the skeleton belong to the same species. Other specimens from the Gobi, besides Opisthocoelicaudia, can be found in the museum's largest exhibition hall, including fossilised dinosaur eggs, the remains of early ceratopsian and ankylosaurian dinosaurs, as well as the tiny skulls of Cretaceous mammals that coexisted with the giant dinosaurs and lived in their shadow.

The skulls and skeletons of enormous carnivorous dinosaurs found in the Cretaceous rocks of the Gobi Desert are also among the exhibits at the museum, and they are on show in a separate exhibition hall. The main attraction is two skeletal mounts of the Tarbosaurus bataar, an Asian relative of the well-known Tyrannosaurus rex. The present understanding of the anatomy of this dinosaur is reflected in the first mount, which depicts the animal with its backbone parallel to the ground. The second historical mount depicts Tarbosaurus in a stance reminiscent of a kangaroo, in line with past theories of dinosaur mobility. These two dissimilar mounts serve as a great illustration of how far dinosaur knowledge has come in the last 50 years. The massive forelimbs of Deinocheirus mirificus were discovered in the Gobi Desert in 1965, and its identity was unknown until more complete skeletons were discovered in 2014, proving that Deinocheirus was a large ostrich-like dinosaur.

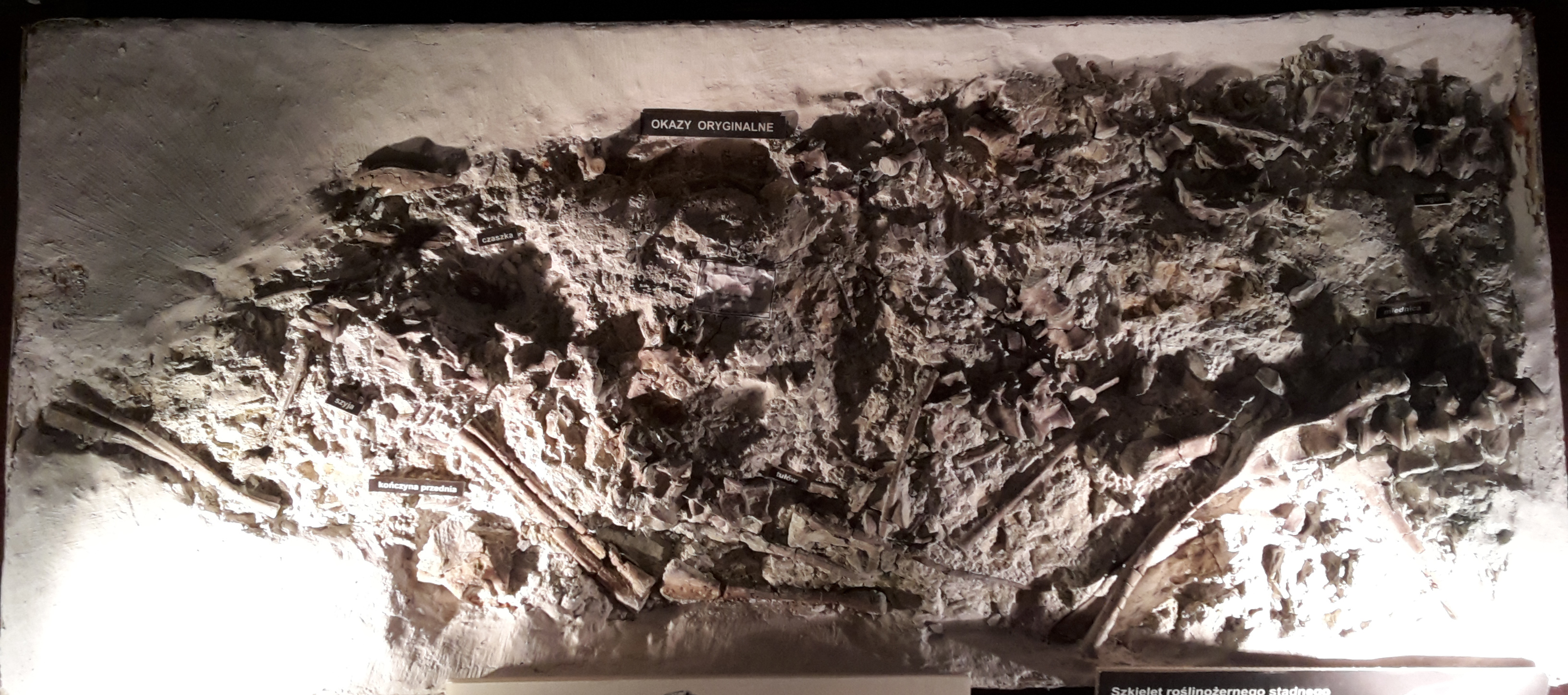
Silesaurus opolensis holotype specimen ZPAL Ab III/361

A group of young scientists led by professor Jerzy Dzik made some of Poland's main palaeontological discoveries in Krasiejów, close to Opole, where they uncovered a cemetery of Late Triassic reptiles and amphibians in 1993. The Krasiejów locality's actual "gemstone" turned revealed to be Silesaurus opolensis, a relative of dinosaurs. The second major focus of the Museums' exhibition is on the skeletons of various terrestrial and aquatic species, as well as live reconstructions of such animals.

The Museum also has other Polish fossils on exhibit, including the oldest frog skeleton ever discovered, which was revealed in Triassic rocks from the area of Cracow.

The casts of pterosaurs and early birds from the renowned German Jurassic Solnhofen limestone, which are some of the best fossil specimens confirming Darwin's theory of evolution, are among the other displays. The Mammal Evolution Hall has a realistic reconstruction of the Australopithecus 'Lucy', which was made by sculptor Marta Szubert under the direction of Karol Sabath, a Polish evolutionary popularizer.
