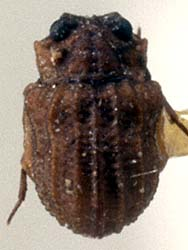
- Lepicerus inaequalis

Scientific classification
- Domain: Eukaryota
- Kingdom: Animalia
- Phylum: Arthropoda
- Class: Insecta
- Order: Coleoptera
- Suborder: Myxophaga
- Superfamily: Lepiceroidea; Hinton, 1936
- Family: Lepiceridae; Hinton, 1936
- Genus: Lepicerus; Motschulsky, 1855

Synonyms
- Family synonymy: Cyathoceridae Sharp, 1882; Haplochelidae Kirejtshuk and Poinar, 2006; Genus synonymy: Cyathocerus Sharp, 1882; Haplochelus Kirejtshuk and Poinar, 2006; Lepiceroides Kirejtshuk and Poinar, 2013; Lepichelus Kirejtshuk and Poinar, 2017

= Lepicerus =

Lepicerus Temporal range: Cenomanian–Recent

Genus of beetles

Lepicerus is a genus of myxophagan beetles containing three described species in the family Lepiceridae; it is the only extant genus in the family, with another genus, Lepiceratus only known from fossils. Extant species occur in the Neotropics, from Mexico south to Venezuela and Ecuador. Fossils referrable to the genus are known from the early Late Cretaceous of Southeast Asia.

== Species ==
- Lepicerus bufo (Hinton, 1936)
- Lepicerus inaequalis Motschulsky, 1855
- Lepicerus pichilingue Flowers, Shepard & Troya, 2010

Three additional species are known from the Late Cretaceous (Cenomanian) as inclusions in Burmese amber from Myanmar.

- †Lepicerus georissoides (Kirejtshuk and Poinar, 2006)
- †Lepicerus mumia Jałoszyński & Yamamoto, 2017
- †Lepicerus pretiosus (Kirejtshuk and Poinar, 2013)

=== Extinct Lepiceridae genera ===
- †Lepiceratus Jałoszyński et al. 2020 Cenomanian, Burmese amber, Myanmar
