= Haloplanus =

Scientific classification
- Domain: Archaea
- Kingdom: Methanobacteriati
- Phylum: Methanobacteriota
- Class: Halobacteria
- Order: Haloferacales
- Family: Haloferacaceae
- Genus: Haloplanus; Elevi Bardavid et al. 2007

Type species
- Haloplanus natans Elevi Bardavid et al. 2007

Species
- See text

Genus of archaea

Haloplanus is a genus of archaeans in the family Halobacteriaceae.

== Phylogeny ==
The currently accepted taxonomy is based on the List of Prokaryotic names with Standing in Nomenclature (LPSN) and National Center for Biotechnology Information (NCBI).

16S rRNA based LTP_07_2026

- Haloplanus
  - - H. litoreus Han & Cui 2014
    - - H. halophilus Zhang et al. 2025
      - - H. pelagicus Zhang et al. 2025
        - - H. ruber Han & Cui 2014
          - - H. rallus Cho et al. 2018
            - H. salinarium Hwang et al. 2017
  - - H. salilacus Zhang et al. 2025
    - - H. halobius Zhang et al. 2025
      - - H. vescus Cui et al. 2010
        - - H. rubicundus Kim et al. 2020
          - - H. aerogenes Cui et al. 2011
            - - H. natans Elevi Bardavid et al. 2007
              - H. salinus Qiu et al. 2014

53 marker proteins based GTDB 11-RS232

- Haloplanus
  - - H. halobius
    - H. salilacus
  - - - H. halophilus
      - - H. litoreus
        - - H. pelagicus
          - - H. ruber
            - H. salinarium [incl. H. rallus]
    - - H. vescus
      - - H. aerogenes
        - - H. natans
          - - H. rubicundus
            - H. salinus

== See also ==
- List of Archaea genera
