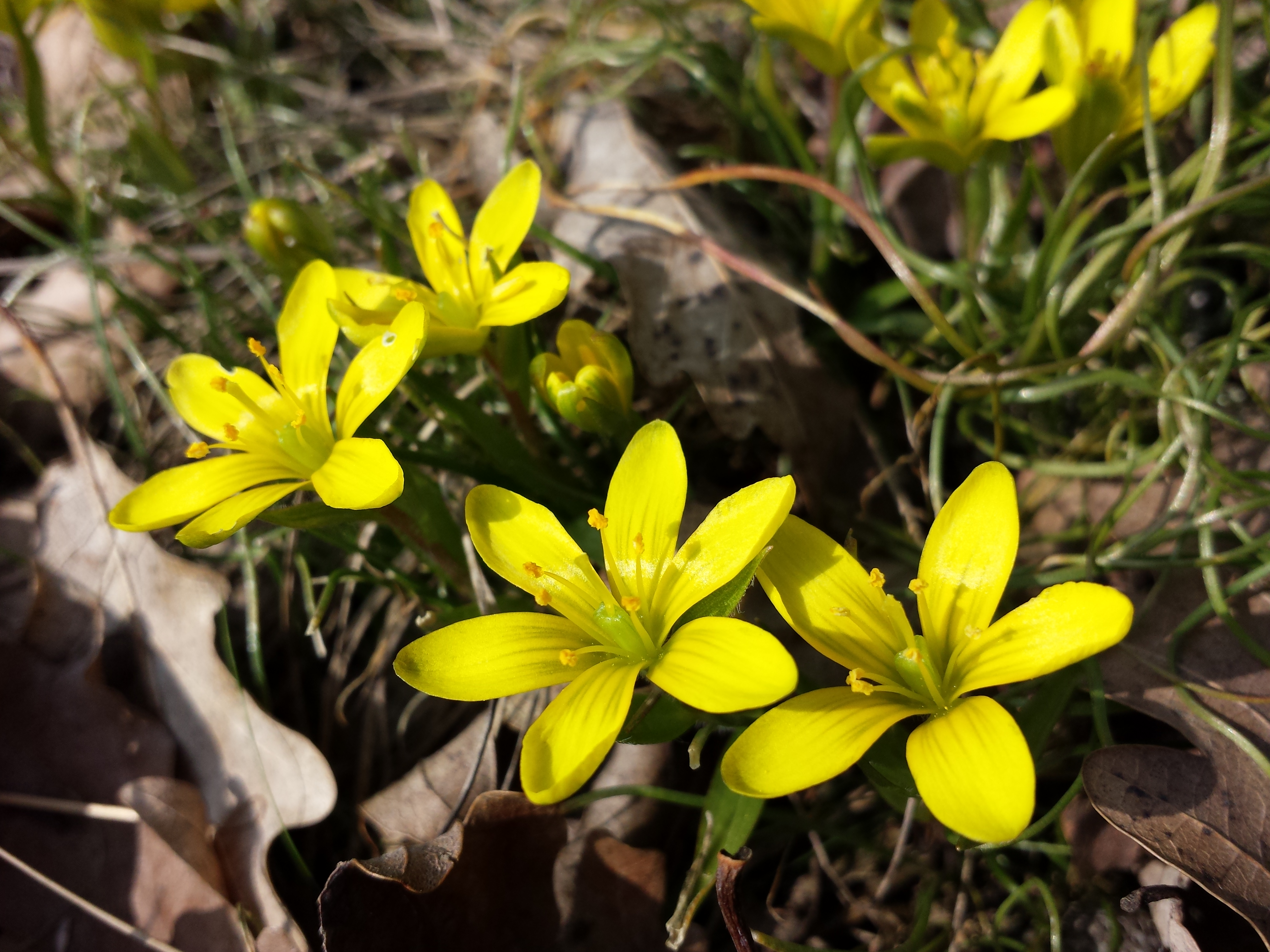
- Early star-of-Bethlehem

Scientific classification
- Kingdom: Plantae
- Clade: Embryophytes
- Clade: Tracheophytes
- Clade: Spermatophytes
- Clade: Angiosperms
- Clade: Monocots
- Order: Liliales
- Family: Liliaceae
- Subfamily: Lilioideae
- Genus: Gagea
- Species: G. bohemica

Binomial name
- Gagea bohemica (Zauschn.) Schult. & Schult.f.

Synonyms
- Synonymy: Ornithogalum bohemicum Zauschn. 1776 not Ten. 1811 nor Lag. ex Willk. & Lange 1862 nor Gaudin 1811 nor Loisel. 1828; Ornithogalum fistulosum Ramond ex DC.; Gagea pygmaea Salisb.; Gagea fistulosa (Ramond ex DC.) Ker Gawl.; Ornithoxanthum bohemicum (Zauschn.) Link; Ornithoxanthum fistulosum (Ramond ex DC.) Link; Reggeria bohemica (Zauschn.) Raf.; Solenarium fistulosum (Ramond ex DC.) Dulac; Stellaster bohemicus (Zauschn.) Kuntze; Stellaris bohemica (Zauschn.) Samp; Anthericum villosum Labill.; Ornithogalum zauschneri Pohl.; Phalangium villosum (Labill.) Poir.; Ornithogalum szovitsii Láng; Gagea saxatilis (Mert. & W.D.J.Koch) Schult. & Schult.f.; Gagea szovitsii (Láng) Besser ex Schult. & Schult.f.; Ornithoxanthum zauschneri (Pohl) Link; Gagea billardieri Kunth; Gagea busambarensis (Tineo) Parl.; Ornithogalum busambarense Tineo; Ornithogalum nebrodense Tod. ex Guss.; Gagea nebrodensis (Tod. ex Guss.) Nyman; Gagea andegavensis F.W.Schultz; Gagea corsica Jord. & Fourr.; Stellaster nebrodensis (Tod. ex Guss.) Kuntze; Stellaster saxatilis (Mert. & W.D.J.Koch) Kuntze; Gagea zauschneri (Pohl) Pascher; Gagea aleppoana Pascher; Gagea callieri Pascher; Gagea lanosa Pascher; Gagea velenovskyana Pascher; Gagea minaae Lojac.; plus many more names at the varietal and subspecific levels

= Gagea bohemica =

Species of flowering plant

Gagea bohemica, the early star-of-Bethlehem or Radnor lily, is a European and Mediterranean species of flowering plant in the lily family. It is sometimes referred to as the Welsh Star-of-Bethlehem.

Gagea bohemica is widespread across central and southern Europe as well as in northern Africa and the Middle East. Its range stretches from the United Kingdom to Morocco to Lebanon to Ukraine. Within the UK, specimens have been discovered at a single site in the Welsh county of Radnorshire, the only location in the United Kingdom from which it has been reported, and the plant has been adopted as the county flower.

As its name suggests, the early star-of-Bethlehem blooms earlier than most other species of Gagea, and is usually found in flower from January to March or April. Its flowers are very similar to those of the yellow star-of-Bethlehem. This belongs to the same genus but it is a less vigorous plant, growing to a height of 2–6 cm and normally having just a single pair of twisting, thread-like basal leaves, with one or two pairs of lanceolate leaves, perhaps 1 cm wide, just below the flowers. The flowers, of which there are usually no more than four on each plant, are yellow and have six petals; they are about 1½ cm in diameter. It grows mainly on dry grassland.
