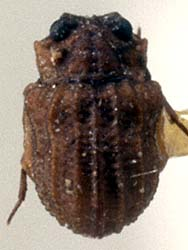

Scientific classification
- Domain: Eukaryota
- Kingdom: Animalia
- Phylum: Arthropoda
- Class: Insecta
- Order: Coleoptera
- Family: Lepiceridae
- Genus: Lepicerus
- Species: L. inaequalis

Binomial name
- Lepicerus inaequalis Motschulsky, 1855

Synonyms
- Cyathocerus horni Sharp, 1882

= Lepicerus inaequalis =

Species of beetle

Lepicerus inaequalis is a species of beetle belonging to the Lepiceridae family; It has sometimes been described as Lepicerus horni. It occurs in Central America as well as in Venezuela.
