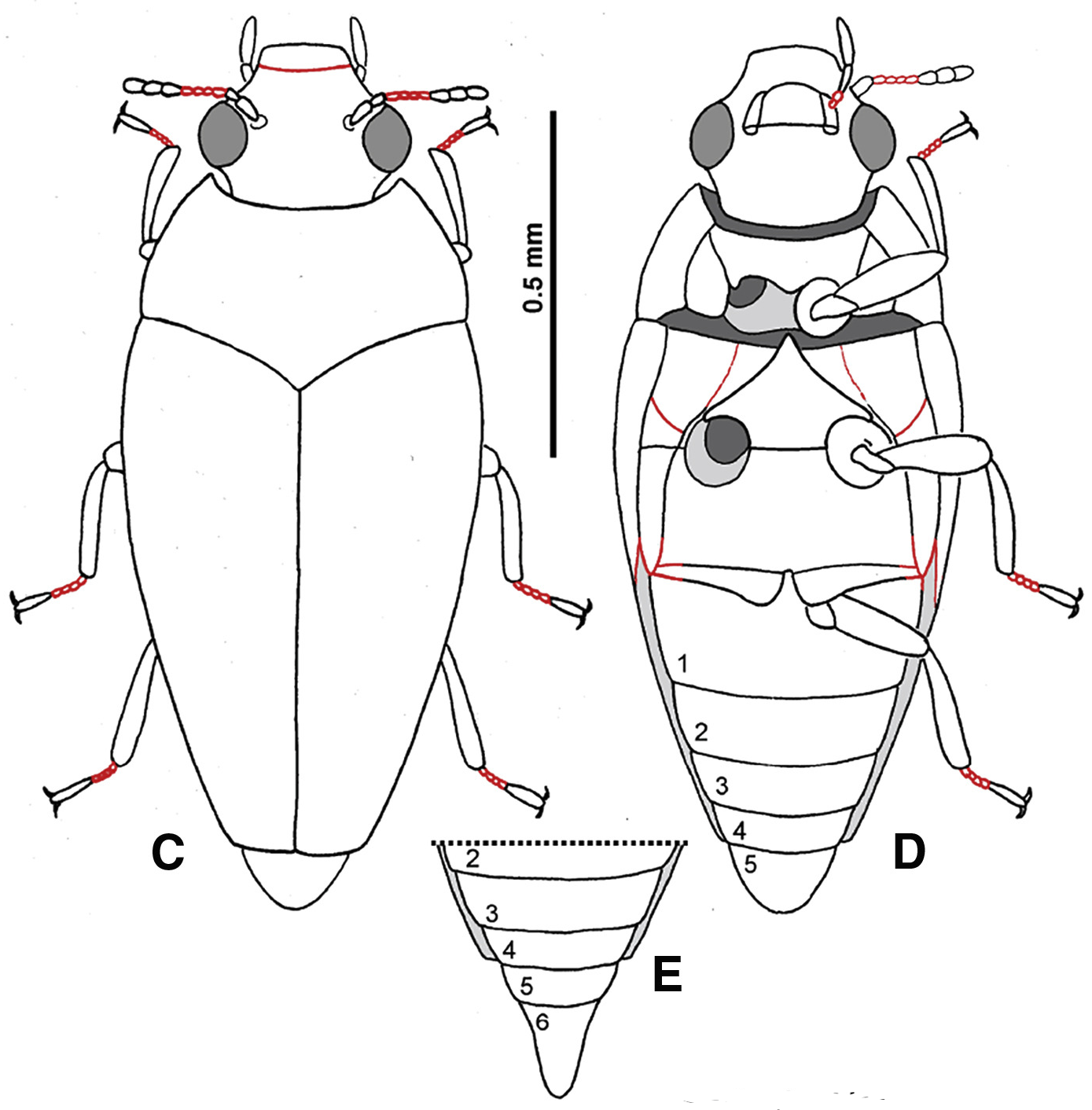
- Interpretive diagram, including variant with 6 abdominal ventrites
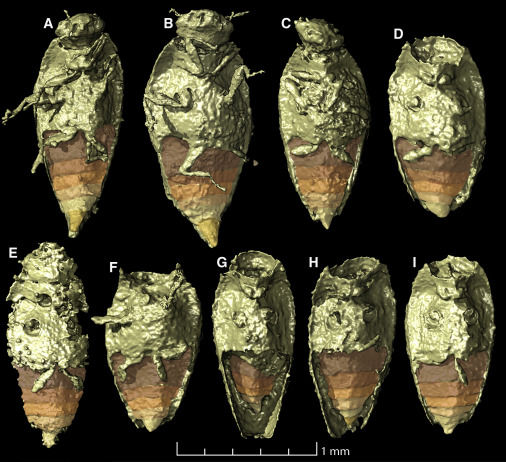
- Several specimens of T. coprolithica seen from the underside

Scientific classification
- Kingdom: Animalia
- Phylum: Arthropoda
- Class: Insecta
- Order: Coleoptera
- Family: †Triamyxidae; Qvarnström et al., 2021
- Genus: †Triamyxa; Qvarnström et al., 2021
- Species: †T. coprolithica

Binomial name
- †Triamyxa coprolithica Qvarnström et al., 2021

= Triamyxa =

Triamyxa Temporal range: Late Triassic, 230 Ma

Extinct genus of beetle

Triamyxa is an extinct genus of myxophagan beetle in the monotypic family Triamyxidae from the Carnian stage of Late Triassic, approximately 230 million years ago. It was found in the Keuper Claystone of Poland. The type species is Triamyxa coprolithica and it was identified from specimens found in the coprolite ZPAL AbIII/3520, likely belonging to the dinosauriform Silesaurus opolensis. Because Triamyxa specimens were found inside coprolites, this may offer a new method of finding insect fossils aside from amber. It is currently the oldest known member of Myxophaga. It was interpreted as either the most basal member of Myxophaga, or a sister group to Hydroscaphidae.

The specimens were preserved in 3D, with their legs and antennae intact and Triamyxa was likely consumed on by accident by Silesaurus while eating other animals, likely larger insects, and the specimens were likely not chewed much, which explains why one Triamyxa specimen was intact and the rest were fragmentary and Triamyxa was also probably present in the environment in large numbers, likely feeding on algal mats in freshwater bodies, similar to modern myxophagans.
