= Jerzy Dzik =

Polish Paleontologist

Jerzy Dzik (born 25 February 1950) is a Polish paleontologist.

He has described many species, genera, and families of conodonts, including the order Ozarkodinida (in 1976).

In 2003, he described the dinosauriform Silesaurus, from the Triassic of Poland.

== Tributes ==
The conodont genus name Dzikodus Zhang 1998 is a tribute to J. Dzik.
