= Haloplanus salinarium =

Scientific classification
- Domain: Archaea
- Kingdom: Methanobacteriati
- Phylum: Methanobacteriota
- Class: Halobacteria
- Order: Haloferacales
- Family: Haloferacaceae
- Genus: Haloplanus
- Species: H. salinarum

Binomial name
- Haloplanus salinarum Hwang et al. 2017

Type strain
- SP28T, JCM 31424T, KCCM 43210T

Species of archaeon

Haloplanus salinarum is a halophilic Archaeon in the family of Halobacteriaceae. It was isolated from the Gomso solar saltern in Buan County, South Korea.
