= Iapir =

Scientific classification
- Domain: Eukaryota
- Kingdom: Animalia
- Phylum: Arthropoda
- Class: Insecta
- Order: Coleoptera
- Family: Torridincolidae
- Genus: Iapir; Py-Daniel, da Fonseca & Barbosa, 1993

Genus of beetles

Iapir is a genus of beetles in the family Torridincolidae, containing these species:

- Iapir borgmeieri (Reichardt & Costa, 1961)
- Iapir britskii (Reichardt & Costa, 1967)
- Iapir castalia Reichardt, 1973
- Iapir trombetensis (Fonseca, Py-Daniel & Barbosa, 1991)
