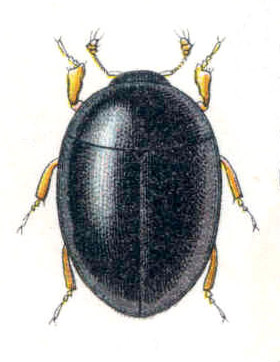

Scientific classification
- Kingdom: Animalia
- Phylum: Arthropoda
- Clade: Pancrustacea
- Class: Insecta
- Order: Coleoptera
- Family: Sphaeriusidae
- Genus: Sphaerius
- Species: S. acaroides

Binomial name
- Sphaerius acaroides Waltl, 1838

= Sphaerius acaroides =

Species of beetle

Sphaerius acaroides is a species of beetle belonging to the family Sphaeriusidae.

It is native to Europe and recorded also in Siberia.
