= Haloplanus natans =

Scientific classification
- Domain: Archaea
- Kingdom: Methanobacteriati
- Phylum: Methanobacteriota
- Class: Halobacteria
- Order: Haloferacales
- Family: Haloferacaceae
- Genus: Haloplanus
- Species: H. natans

Binomial name
- Haloplanus natans Elevi Bardavid et al. 2007

Type strain
- RE-101, JCM 25092, DSM 17983

Species of archaeon

Haloplanus natans is a halophilic Archaeon in the family of Halobacteriaceae and the type species of the genus Haloplanus. It was isolated from controlled mesocosms with a mixture of water from the Dead Sea and the Red Sea.
