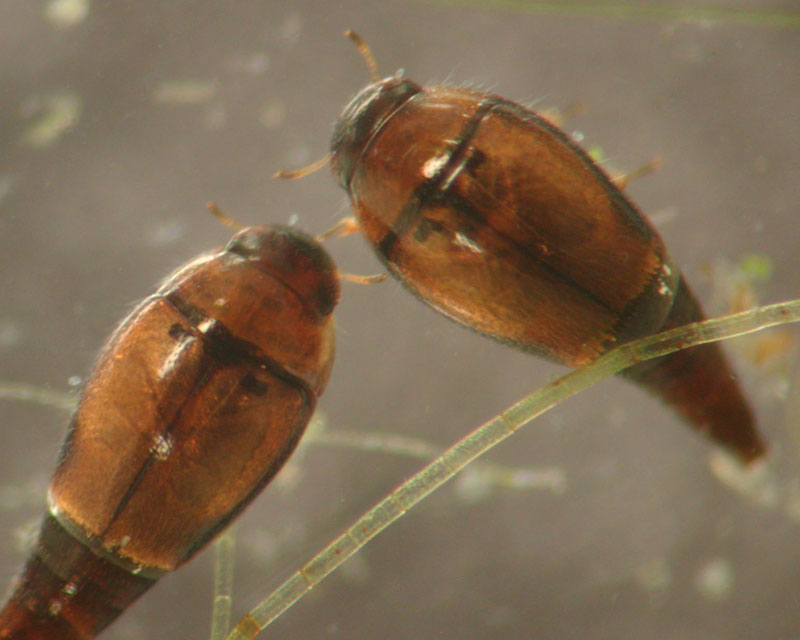

Scientific classification
- Kingdom: Animalia
- Phylum: Arthropoda
- Class: Insecta
- Order: Coleoptera
- Family: Hydroscaphidae
- Genus: Hydroscapha
- Species: H. natans

Binomial name
- Hydroscapha natans LeConte, 1874

= Hydroscapha natans =

Species of beetle

Hydroscapha natans is a species of skiff beetle in the family of Hydroscaphidae. It is found in North America.They have been mainly found in Mexico, California, Arizona, Nevada and Idaho, occurring in both cool streams and hot springs. It has been observed feeding on mats of filamentous green algae.
