= Confossa =

Scientific classification
- Domain: Eukaryota
- Kingdom: Animalia
- Phylum: Arthropoda
- Class: Insecta
- Order: Coleoptera
- Family: Hydroscaphidae
- Genus: Confossa; Joly, Garcia & Maddison, 2015

Genus of beetle

Confossa is a genus of water beetle in the family Hydroscaphidae, discovered in 2015 and endemic to South America.

== Taxonomy ==
The genus Confossa contains the following three species:

- Confossa falcata
- Confossa minima
- Confossa sculptura
