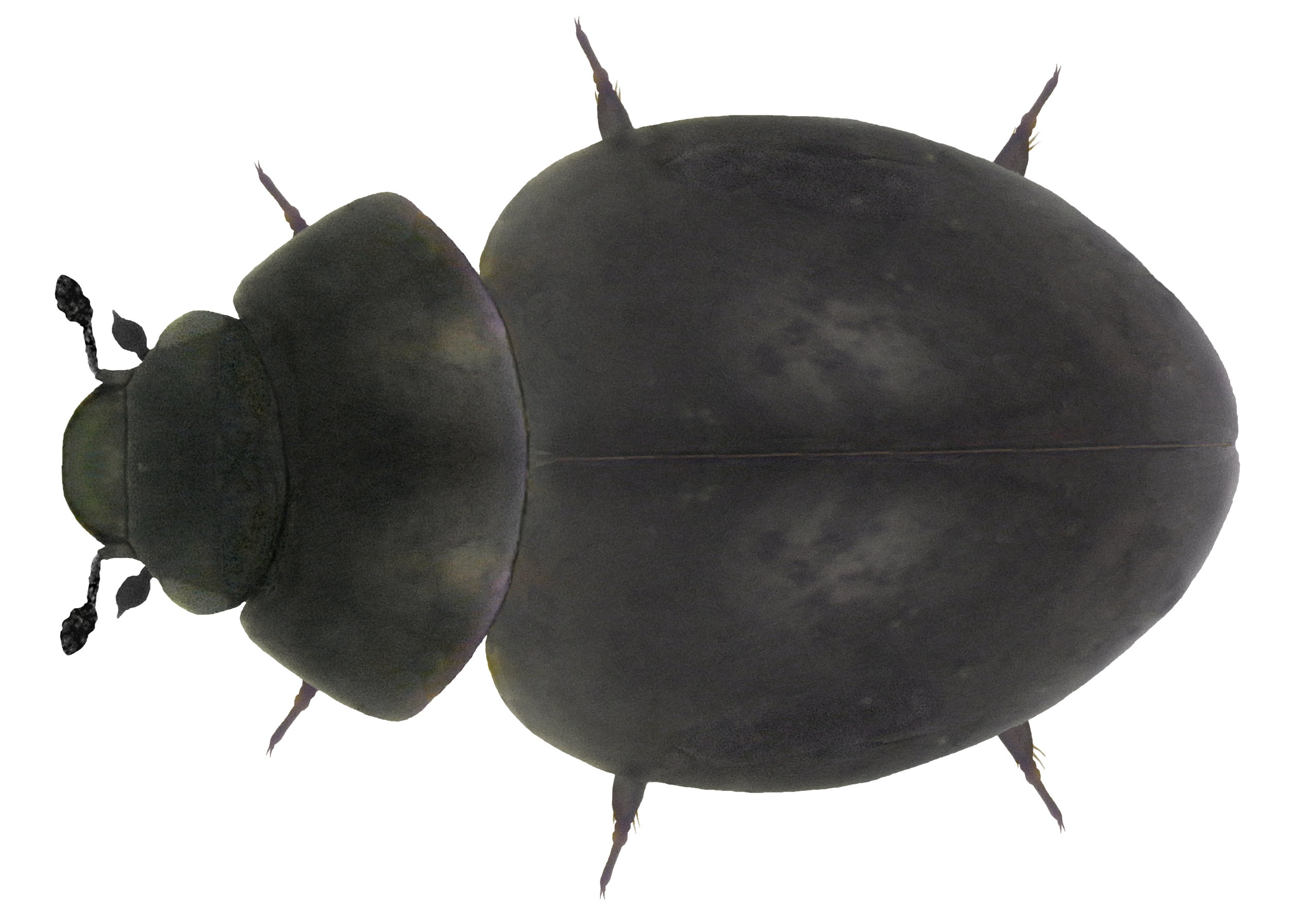
- Sphaerius acaroides

Scientific classification
- Kingdom: Animalia
- Phylum: Arthropoda
- Class: Insecta
- Order: Coleoptera
- Family: Sphaeriusidae
- Genus: Sphaerius; Waltl, 1838

Species
- See text

Synonyms
- Microsporus Kolenati, 1846; Neosphaerius Oke, 1954

= Sphaerius =

Sphaerius Temporal range: Cenomanian–recent

Genus of beetles

Sphaerius is a genus of beetles in the family Sphaeriusidae, comprising 18 extant species. It is one of the two extant genera in the family, the other being Bezesporum. They are typically found along the edges of streams and rivers, where they feed on algae; they occur on all continents except Antarctica. Three species occur in the United States.

The overall form of the beetle is convex, glossy, dark brown or black with some markings possible. The head is prominent, with relatively large eyes set far apart, and capitate antennae. Total length ranges from 0.5–1.2 mm (0.020–0.047 in).

The beetles occur in a variety of damp environments, including mud, under stones, among plant roots and leaf litter, and in mosses in bogs. They store some air underneath their elytra.

Females produce a single large egg at a time.

The family used to be known as "Sphaeriidae", but the name was preoccupied by a family of freshwater clams. The name was inappropriately replaced with "Microsporidae" (by changing the genus name to Microsporus), but this act has been superseded by a return to the use of Sphaerius and a reformation of the family name as Sphaeriusidae. The position of the family within Coleoptera has also changed a number of times.

== Species ==
The genus includes the following 18 extant species, as of 2022:

- Sphaerius acaroides Waltl, 1838 – Europe
- Sphaerius africanus (Endrödy-Younga, 1997) – South Africa
- Sphaerius alticola (Löbl, 1995) – Nepal
- Sphaerius coomani Lesne, 1936 – Vietnam
- Sphaerius gustavlohsei (Löbl, 1995) – Nepal, India: Darjeeling
- Sphaerius hispanicus Matthews, 1899 – France, Spain, Algeria, Tunisia
- Sphaerius humicola (Löbl, 1995) – Nepal
- Sphaerius laeviventris Champion, 1923 – India: Uttarakhand
- Sphaerius madecassus Paulian, 1949 – Madagascar
- Sphaerius obsoletus Lesne, 1936 – Vietnam
- Sphaerius ovensensis (Oke, 1954) – Australia
- Sphaerius perlaevis Lesne, 1936 – Vietnam
- Sphaerius politus Horn, 1868 – USA: California
- Sphaerius silvicola (Löbl, 1995) – Nepal
- Sphaerius spississimus Lesne, 1935 – France: Corsica, Italy: Sardinia, Israel
- Sphaerius tesselatus Lesne, 1936 – Vietnam
- Sphaerius texanus Matthews, 1899 – USA: Texas
- Sphaerius tropicus Matthews, 1888 – Guatemala

Species transferred to Bezesporum:

- Sphaerius minutus Liang & Jia, 2018 – China: Jiangxi
- Sphaerius papulosus Lesne, 1940 – Myanmar

Species of unclear assignment:

- Sphaerius cribratus Lesne, 1936 – Vietnam
- Sphaerius favosus Lesne, 1936 – Vietnam

Species excluded from Sphaeriusidae (actually representatives of Corylophidae):

- "Sphaerius" coenensis Oke, 1954 – Australia
- "Sphaerius" scutellaris (LeConte, 1878) – USA

== Fossil species ==
- †Sphaerius martini Li and Cai, 2023 – Burmese amber, Myanmar, Cenomanian
