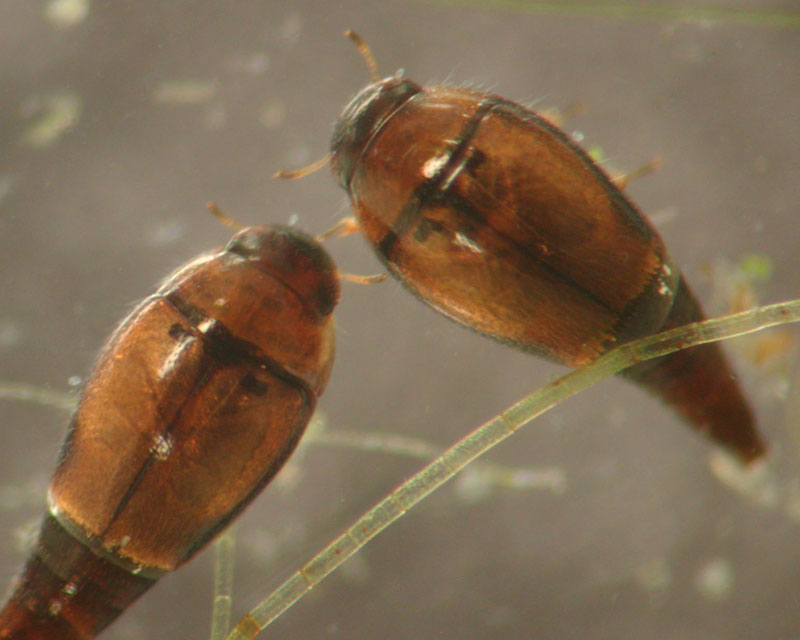
- Hydroscapha natans

Scientific classification
- Domain: Eukaryota
- Kingdom: Animalia
- Phylum: Arthropoda
- Class: Insecta
- Order: Coleoptera
- Family: Hydroscaphidae
- Genus: Hydroscapha; LeConte, 1874

= Hydroscapha =

Genus of beetles

Hydroscapha is a genus of beetles endemic to Europe and the United States. It contains these species:

- Hydroscapha coomani Löbl, 1994
- Hydroscapha crotchi Sharp, 1874
- Hydroscapha granulum (Motschulsky, 1855)
- Hydroscapha gyrinoides Aube
- Hydroscapha hunanensis
- Hydroscapha jaechi Löbl, 1994
- Hydroscapha jumaloni Sato, 1972
- Hydroscapha mauretanica Peyerimhoff, 1922
- Hydroscapha monticola Löbl, 1994
- Hydroscapha natans LeConte, 1874
- Hydroscapha nepalensis Löbl, 1994
- Hydroscapha reichardti Löbl, 1994
- Hydroscapha saboureaui Paulian, 1949
- Hydroscapha satoi Löbl, 1994
- Hydroscapha sharpi Reitter, 1887
- Hydroscapha substrigosa Champion, 1920
- Hydroscapha takahashii Miwa, 1934
- Hydroscapha turbinata Champion, 1925
