= Delevea =

Scientific classification
- Kingdom: Animalia
- Phylum: Arthropoda
- Clade: Pancrustacea
- Class: Insecta
- Order: Coleoptera
- Family: Torridincolidae
- Subfamily: Deleveinae; Endrödy-Younga, 1997
- Genus: Delevea; Reichardt, 1976

Genus of beetles

Delevea is a genus of Southern African beetles in the family Torridincolidae, containing:

- Delevea bertrandi Reichardt, 1976
- Delevea madiba Bilton and Mlambo, 2023
- Delevea namaqua Bilton and Mlambo, 2023
- Delevea namibensis Endrödy-Younga, 1997

At 2.85 mm of adult body length, Delevea namaqua is the largest species in all of the beetle suborder Myxophaga.
