= Yara (beetle) =

Scientific classification
- Domain: Eukaryota
- Kingdom: Animalia
- Phylum: Arthropoda
- Class: Insecta
- Order: Coleoptera
- Family: Hydroscaphidae
- Genus: Yara; Reichardt & Hinton, 1976

Genus of beetles

Yara is a genus of beetles in the family Hydroscaphidae, from South America and Central America. Containing five species:

- Yara dybasi (Reichardt & Hinton, 1976) – Panama
- Yara vanini (Reichardt & Hinton, 1976) – Brazil
- Yara maculata (Short, Joly & Garcia, 2010) – Venezuela
- Yara marmontsedu (Reyes, Espinoza & Girón, 2019) – Nicaragua
- Yara oyaguei (Trujillo & Cañote, 2023) – Peru
