= Claudiella =

Claudiella ingens

Scientific classification
- Domain: Eukaryota
- Kingdom: Animalia
- Phylum: Arthropoda
- Class: Insecta
- Order: Coleoptera
- Family: Torridincolidae
- Genus: Claudiella; Reichardt & Vanin, 1976
- Species: C. ingens

Binomial name
- Claudiella ingens Reichardt & Vanin, 1976

Genus of beetles

Claudiella ingens is a species of beetle in the family Torridincolidae, is one of four species of Claudiella. All species are native to Brazil.
