= Sitona gemellatus =

Scientific classification
- Kingdom: Animalia
- Phylum: Arthropoda
- Class: Insecta
- Order: Coleoptera
- Suborder: Polyphaga
- Infraorder: Cucujiformia
- Family: Curculionidae
- Genus: Sitona
- Species: S. gemellatus

Binomial name
- Sitona gemellatus Gyllenhal, 1834

Species of beetle

Sitona gemellatus is a species of beetle belonging to the family Curculionidae.

It is native to Europe.
