= Scaphydra =

Scientific classification
- Domain: Eukaryota
- Kingdom: Animalia
- Phylum: Arthropoda
- Class: Insecta
- Order: Coleoptera
- Family: Hydroscaphidae
- Genus: Scaphydra; Reichardt, 1973

Genus of beetles

Scaphydra is a genus of beetles in the family Hydroscaphidae, containing the following species:

- Scaphydra angra (Reichardt, 1971) - Brazil.
- Scaphydra hintoni (Reichardt, 1971) - Brazil.
- Scaphydra pygmaea (Reichardt, 1971) - Brazil.
