= Torridincola =

Scientific classification
- Domain: Eukaryota
- Kingdom: Animalia
- Phylum: Arthropoda
- Class: Insecta
- Order: Coleoptera
- Family: Torridincolidae
- Genus: Torridincola; Steffan, 1964

Genus of beetles

Torridincola is a genus of beetles in the family Torridincolidae, containing these species:

- Torridincola congolesica Steffan, 1973
- Torridincola natalesica Steffan, 1973
- Torridincola rhodesica
