= Incoltorrida =

Incoltorrida madagassica

Scientific classification
- Kingdom: Animalia
- Phylum: Arthropoda
- Clade: Pancrustacea
- Class: Insecta
- Order: Coleoptera
- Family: Torridincolidae
- Genus: Incoltorrida; Steffan, 1973

Genus of beetles

Incoltorrida is a genus of myxophagan water beetles from Madagascar in the family Torridincolidae.

The species I. madagassica has been found to host ciliates of the genus Platycola on their body surface. The meaning of this relationship is unknown.

== Species ==
- I. benesculpta Perkins & Bergsten, 2019
- I. galoko Perkins & Bergsten, 2019
- I. madagassica Steffan, 1973
- I. magna Perkins & Bergsten, 2019
- I. merojejy Perkins & Bergsten, 2019
- I. quintacostata Perkins & Bergsten, 2019
- I. zahamena Perkins & Bergsten, 2019
