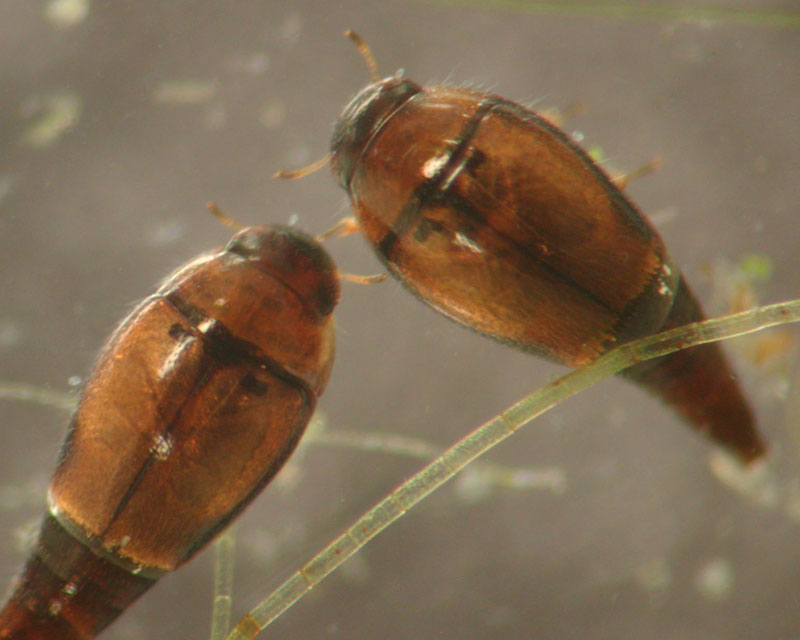
- Hydroscapha natans

Scientific classification
- Kingdom: Animalia
- Phylum: Arthropoda
- Clade: Pancrustacea
- Class: Insecta
- Order: Coleoptera
- Suborder: Myxophaga
- Superfamily: Sphaeriusoidea
- Family: Hydroscaphidae; LeConte, 1874

Genera
- Hydroscapha LeConte, 1874; Scaphydra Reichardt, 1973; Yara Reichardt & Hinton, 1976; Confossa Short, Joly, García & Maddison, 2015

= Hydroscaphidae =

Hydroscaphidae Temporal range: Aptian–Recent

Family of beetles

The Hydroscaphidae are a small family of water beetles known commonly as skiff beetles. As of 2010, there are 23 species in the family. Several are recently described.

These beetles are small, most under 2 mm (0.079 in) in length. They are tan to brown in color and the elytra are abbreviated, leaving several tapering tergites of the abdomen exposed. The wings are fringed with long setae. The larvae are fusiform, with a wide thorax and a narrowing abdomen.

Hydroscaphidae live on mats of algae with a thin layer of running water. This may be the accumulated algae lining the very edge of a stream of water. They tolerate a wide range of temperatures; they have been observed in hot springs and in icy snowmelt. Algae are their food source.

The reproductive cycle is not well known. In at least one species, the female lays a single large egg on algal mats.

Hydroscaphid species have been reported from every continent except Antarctica.

Genera:

- Hydroscapha LeConte, 1874 – United States and Europe.
- Scaphydra Reichardt, 1973 – Brazil.
- Yara Reichardt & Hinton, 1976 – South America and Central America.
- Confossa Short, Joly, García & Maddison, 2015 – South America
