= Ytu (beetle) =

Scientific classification
- Domain: Eukaryota
- Kingdom: Animalia
- Phylum: Arthropoda
- Class: Insecta
- Order: Coleoptera
- Family: Torridincolidae
- Genus: Ytu; Reichardt, 1973

Genus of beetles

Ytu is a genus of beetles in the family Torridincolidae, containing these species:

- Ytu angra Reichardt & Vanin, 1977
- Ytu artemis Reichardt, 1973
- Ytu athena Reichardt, 1973
- Ytu brutus Spangler, 1980
- Ytu cleideae Vanin, 1991
- Ytu cupidus Reichardt, 1973
- Ytu cuyaba Reichardt & Vanin, 1977
- Ytu demeter Reichardt, 1973
- Ytu godayi Reichardt & Vanin, 1977
- Ytu hephaestus Reichardt, 1973
- Ytu itati Reichardt & Vanin, 1977
- Ytu mirandus Reichardt & Vanin, 1977
- Ytu mirim Reichardt & Vanin, 1977
- Ytu morpheus Reichardt, 1973
- Ytu phebo Reichardt, 1973
- Ytu reichardti Vanin, 1978
- Ytu yaguar Reichardt & Vanin, 1977
- Ytu ysypo Reichardt & Vanin, 1977
- Ytu zeus Reichardt, 1973
