= Sebastian Endrödy-Younga =

Hungarian entomologist (1934–1999)

Sebastian Endrödy-Younga (26 June 1934 – 26 February 1999) was a Hungarian-born entomologist who specialized in the beetles particularly of the African region, working for many years in the Transvaal Museum.

Endrödy-Younga was the son of the Hungarian entomologist Sebö Endrödi. His family name was changed, with a spelling change and the addition of the mother's family name, so that the father and son could be distinguished in the authorship of zoological names. After receiving a Ph.D. from the Roland Eötvös University in 1959 he worked with Zoltán Kaszab at the Természettudomânyi Mûzeum in Budapest. He collected in Africa as part of a UNESCO expedition and later spent eight years in Ghana working for the UN FAO. He moved to South Africa in 1973 working with Dr. Charles Koch at the Transvaal Museum. He built up a collection of the African beetles.
