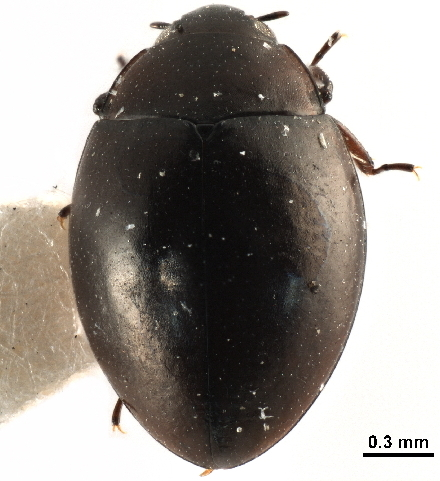
- Satonius kurosawai (Torridincolidae)

Scientific classification
- Kingdom: Animalia
- Phylum: Arthropoda
- Clade: Pancrustacea
- Class: Insecta
- Order: Coleoptera
- Suborder: Myxophaga; Crowson, 1955

Families
- Hydroscaphidae; Lepiceridae; Sphaeriusidae; Torridincolidae †Triamyxidae

= Myxophaga =

Myxophaga Temporal range: Carnian–Recent

Suborder of beetles

Myxophaga is the second-smallest suborder of the Coleoptera after Archostemata, consisting of roughly 112 species of small to minute beetles in four families. The members of this suborder are aquatic and semiaquatic, and feed on algae.

== Description ==
Myxophaga are minute beetles; the largest known species, Delevea namaqua, is only 2.85 mm long. They have several diagnostic features: the antennae are more or less distinctly clubbed with usually fewer than nine segments, mesocoxal cavities are open laterally and bordered by a mesepimeron and metanepisternum, the hind wings are rolled apically in the resting positions. Internally, they are characterised by the presence of six malpighian tubules and the testes are tube-like and coiled.

Beetles of this suborder are adapted to feed on algae. Their mouthparts are characteristic in lacking galeae and having a mobile tooth on their left mandible.

== Phylogeny ==
A 2019 phylogenetic study of Coleoptera recovered Myxophaga and Archostemata as two branches of a clade sister to Adephaga. According to the study, Myxophaga originated between the late Carboniferous and the early Triassic.

== Taxonomy ==
There are four extant families in the suborder Myxophaga divided between two superfamilies, containing about 112 described species, and at least one extinct family. (Note: † Denotes that the group is extinct)

Superfamily Lepiceroidea Hinton, 1936

- Family Lepiceridae Hinton, 1936
  - Lepicerus Motschulsky, 1855
  - †Lepiceratus Jałoszyński et al. 2020

Superfamily Sphaeriusoidea Erichson, 1845

- Family Hydroscaphidae LeConte, 1874
  - Hydroscapha LeConte, 1874
  - Scaphydra Reichardt, 1973
  - Yara Reichardt & Hinton, 1976
  - Confossa Short, Joly, García & Maddison, 2015
- Family Sphaeriusidae Erichson, 1845
  - Sphaerius Waltl, 1838
  - Bezesporum Fikáček et al. 2022
  - †Burmasporum Kirejtshuk 2009
  - †Crowsonaerius Li & Cai in Li et al. 2023
- Family Torridincolidae Steffan, 1964
  - Claudiella Reichardt & Vanin, 1976
  - Delevea Reichardt, 1976
  - Iapir Py-Daniel, da Fonseca & Barbosa, 1993
  - Incoltorrida Steffan, 1973
  - Satonius Endrödy-Younga, 1997
  - Torridincola Steffan, 1964
  - Ytu Reichardt, 1973

Family †Triamyxidae Qvarnström et al. 2021

- †Triamyxa Qvarnström et al. 2021

Unplaced in family

- †Leehermania Chatzimanolis et al. 2012

== Distribution ==
Living members of Lepiceridae are confined to northern South America and Central America. Members of Sphaeriusidae occur on all continents except Antarctica, while Hydroscaphidae occurs on all continents except Australia and Antarctica. Torridincolidae occurs in Africa, Asia, and South America.

== Fossil record ==
The fossil record of myxophagan beetles is sparse, likely due to their small size limiting preservation potential. The currently oldest myxophagan is Triamyxa, described in 2021 from numerous specimens of found in a coprolite found in Late Triassic (late Carnian, around 232-227 million years ago) aged sediments in Poland. It was placed in its own monotypic family Triamyxidae, and was resolved as either the most basal myxophagan or sister to Hydroscaphidae. The next oldest is Leehermania from the Late Triassic (Norian) Cow Branch Formation of North Carolina, which had previously been interpreted as the oldest known rove beetle but in 2019 was reinterpreted as an early diverging relative of the family Hydroscaphidae. A fossil impression assigned to the living genus Hydroscapha in Hydroscaphidae is known from the Yixian Formation in the Jehol Biota, dating from the Early Cretaceous (Aptian). Fossils from the early Late Cretaceous (Cenomanian) aged Burmese amber from Myanmar, have been assigned to the extant genus Lepicerus and extinct genus Lepiceratus within Lepiceridae, as well as the extant Sphaerius and Bezesporum and the extinct Burmasporum and Crowsonaerius, belonging to Sphaerusidae.

== Gallery ==
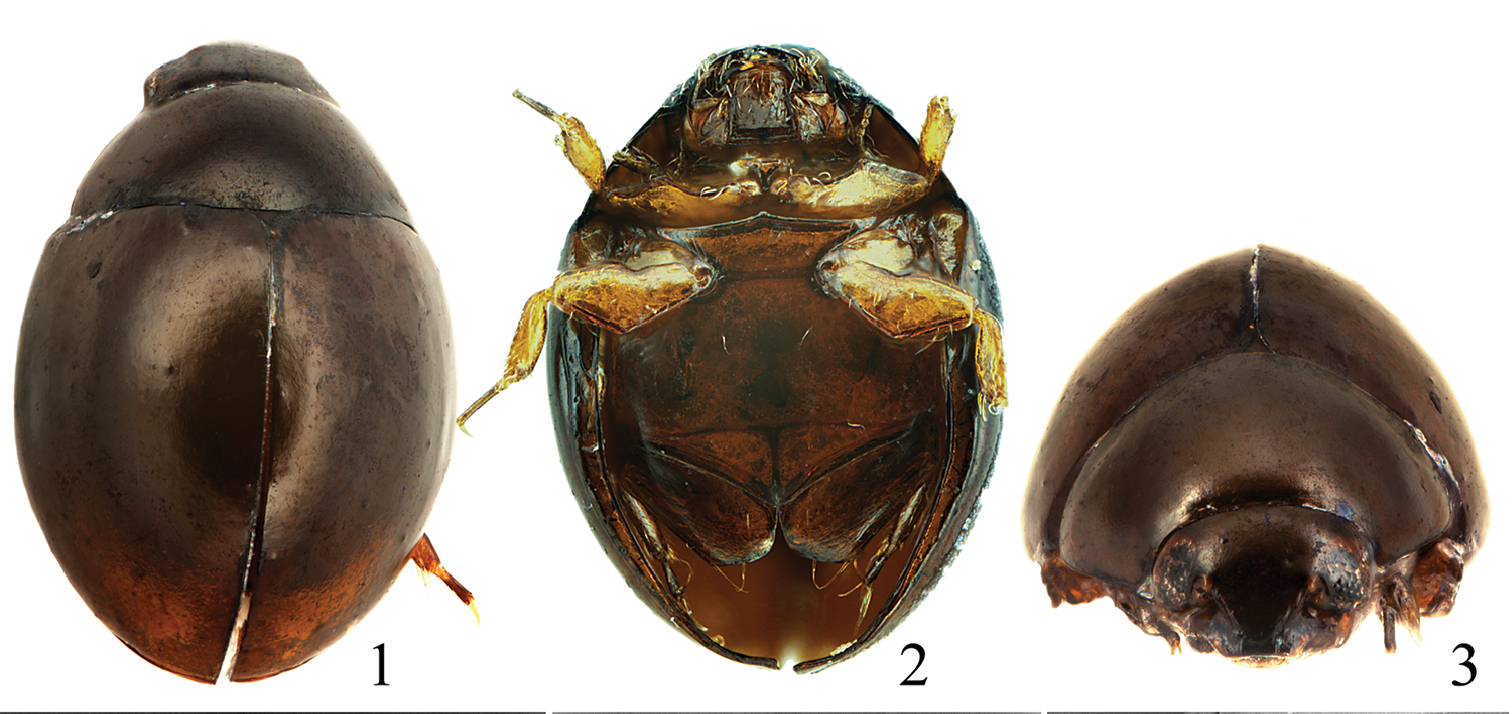
Specimen of Sphaerius minutus (Sphaeriusidae) in various views

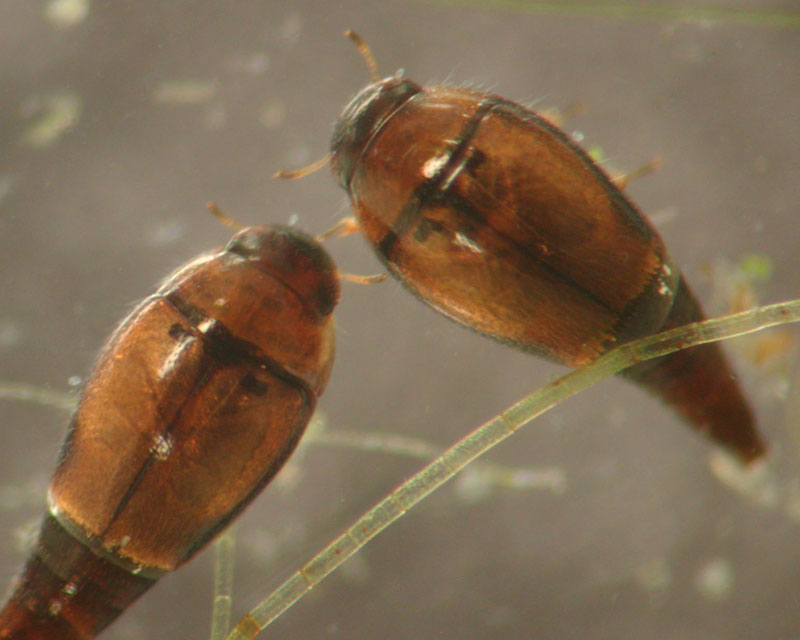
Specimens of Hydroscapha natans (Hydroscaphidae)

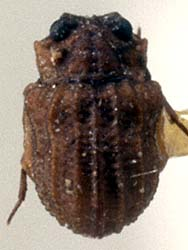
Specimen of Lepicerus inaequalis (Lepiceridae)

== See also ==
- List of subgroups of the order Coleoptera
