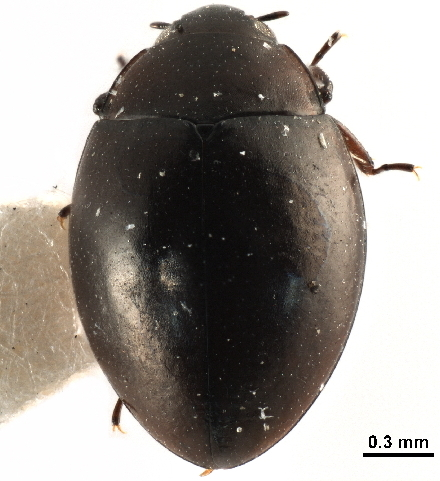
- Satonius kurosawai

Scientific classification
- Domain: Eukaryota
- Kingdom: Animalia
- Phylum: Arthropoda
- Class: Insecta
- Order: Coleoptera
- Suborder: Myxophaga
- Superfamily: Sphaeriusoidea
- Family: Torridincolidae; Steffan, 1964

= Torridincolidae =

Family of beetles

The Torridincolidae are a small family of beetles in the suborder Myxophaga. It contains these genera:

- Claudiella Reichardt & Vanin, 1976 – Brazil
- Delevea Reichardt, 1976 – Southern Africa
- Iapir Py-Daniel, da Fonseca & Barbosa, 1993 – South America
- Incoltorrida Steffan, 1973
- Satonius Endrödy-Younga, 1997
- Torridincola Steffan, 1964
- Ytu Reichardt, 1973
