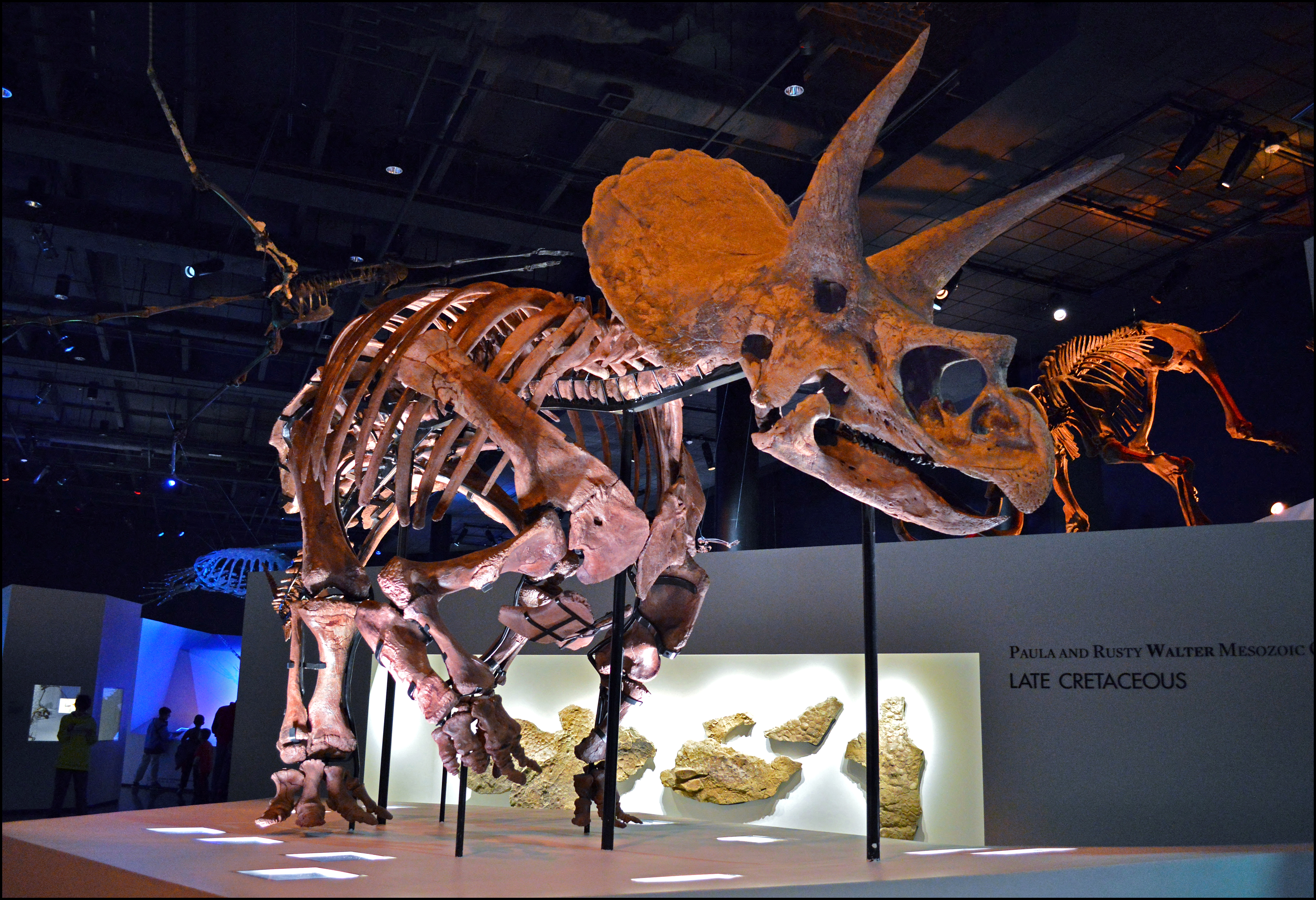
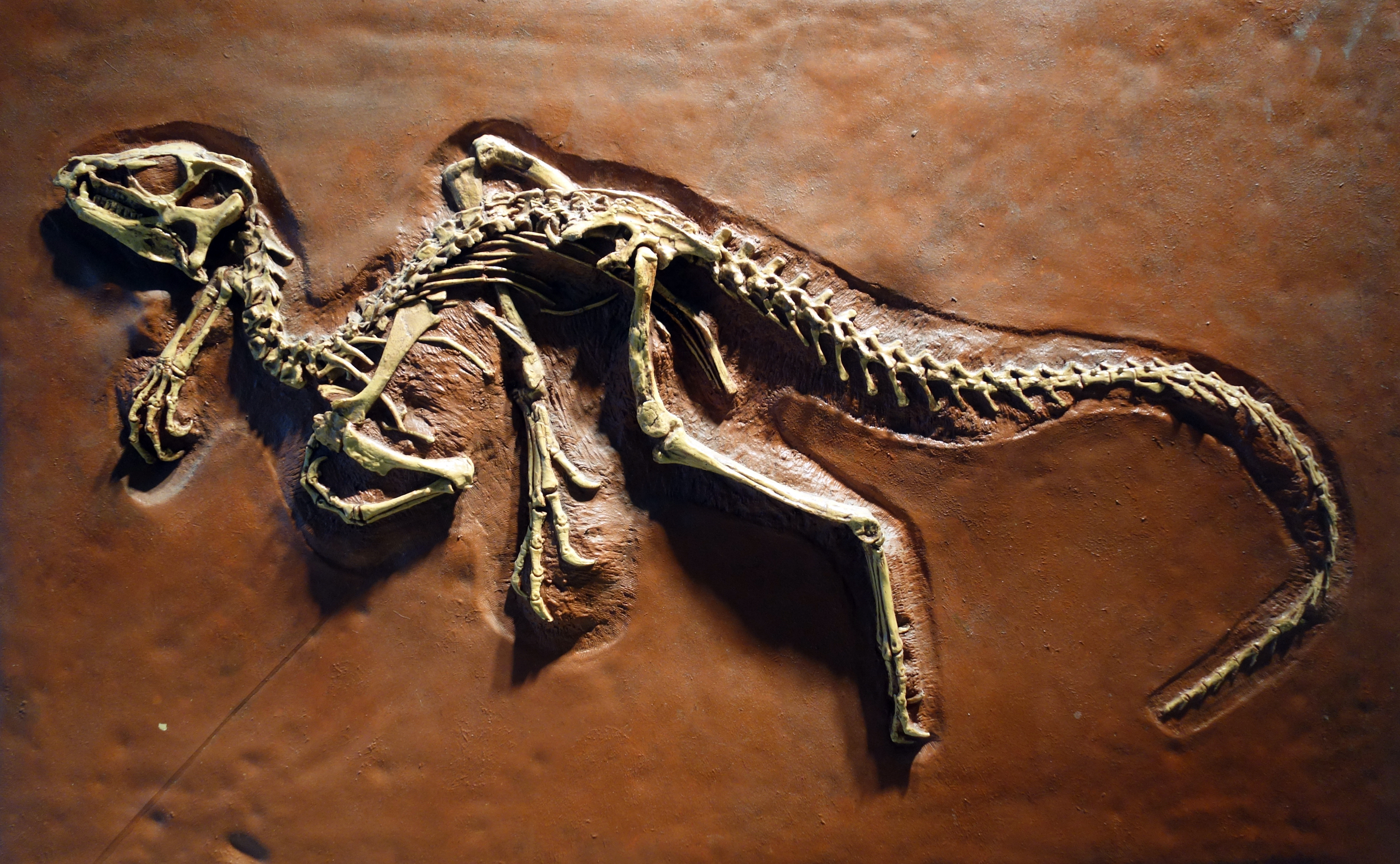
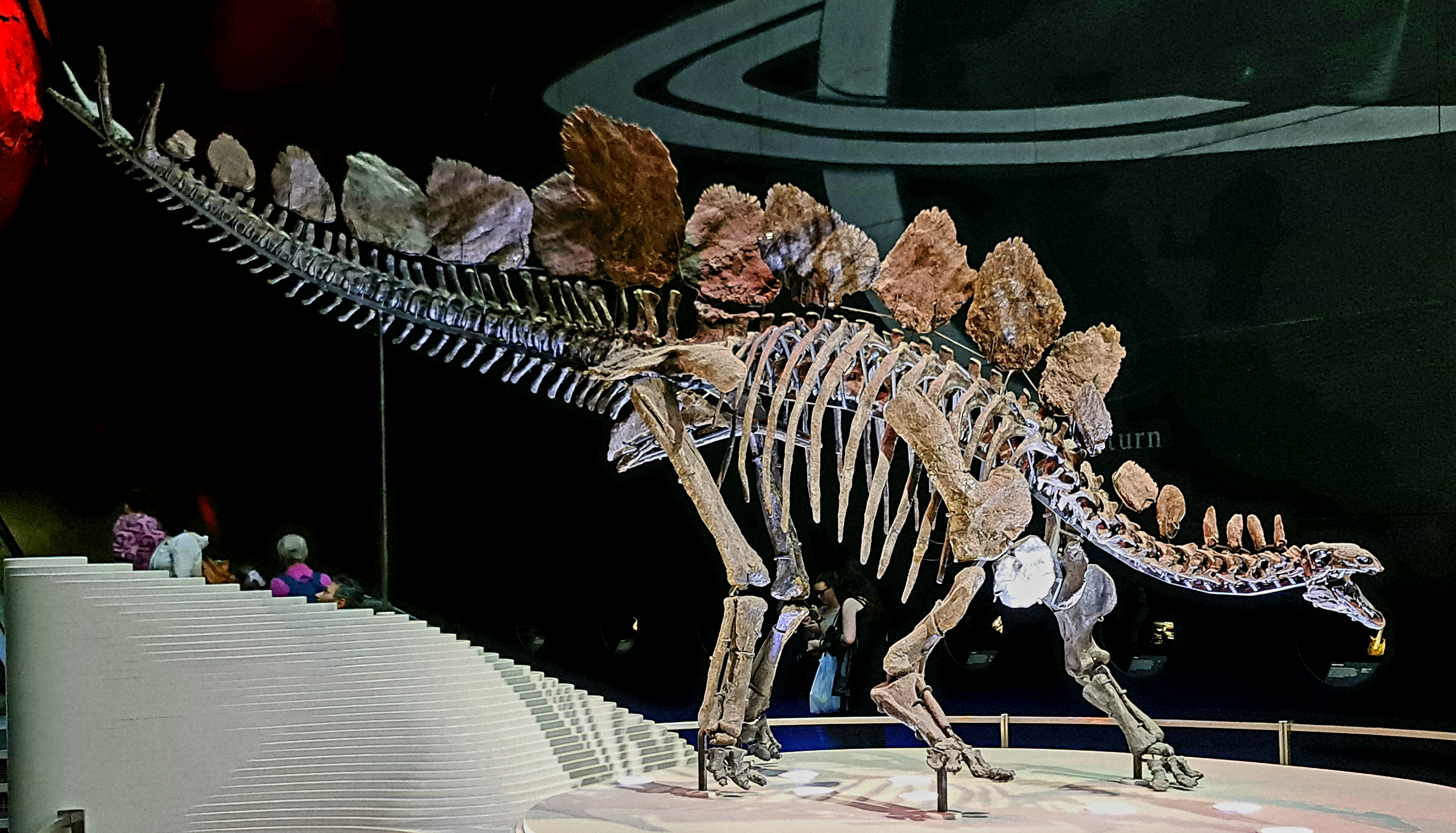
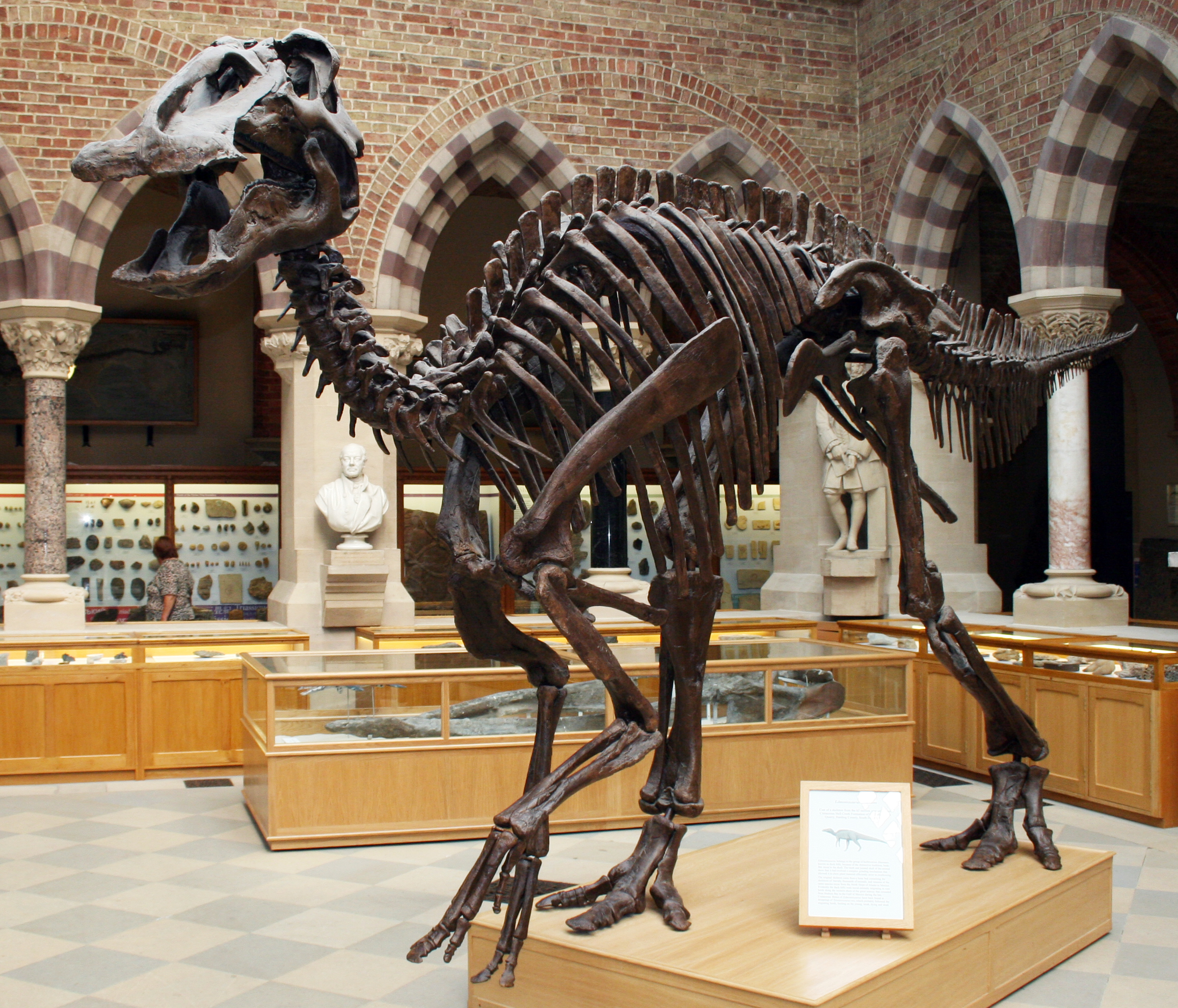
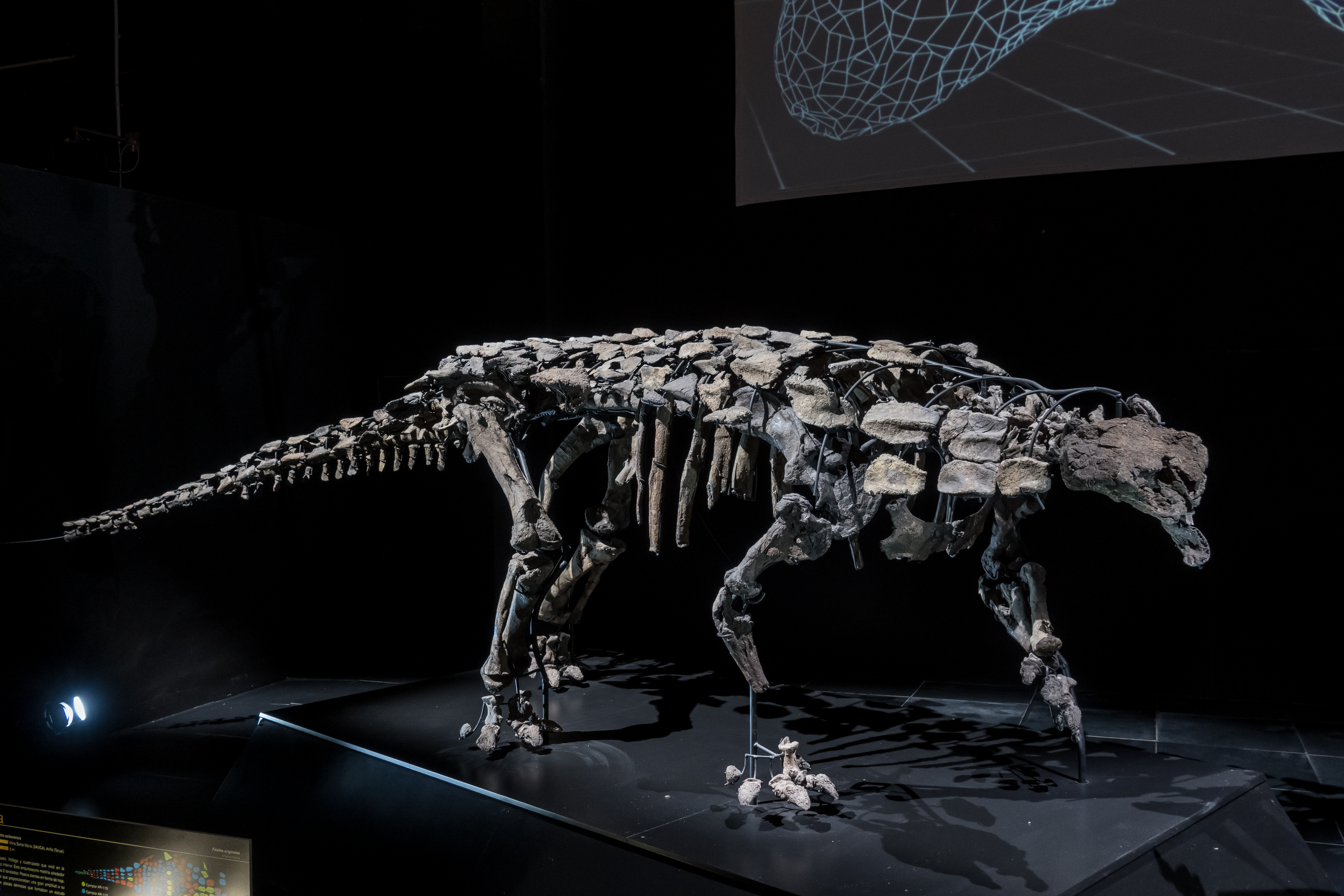
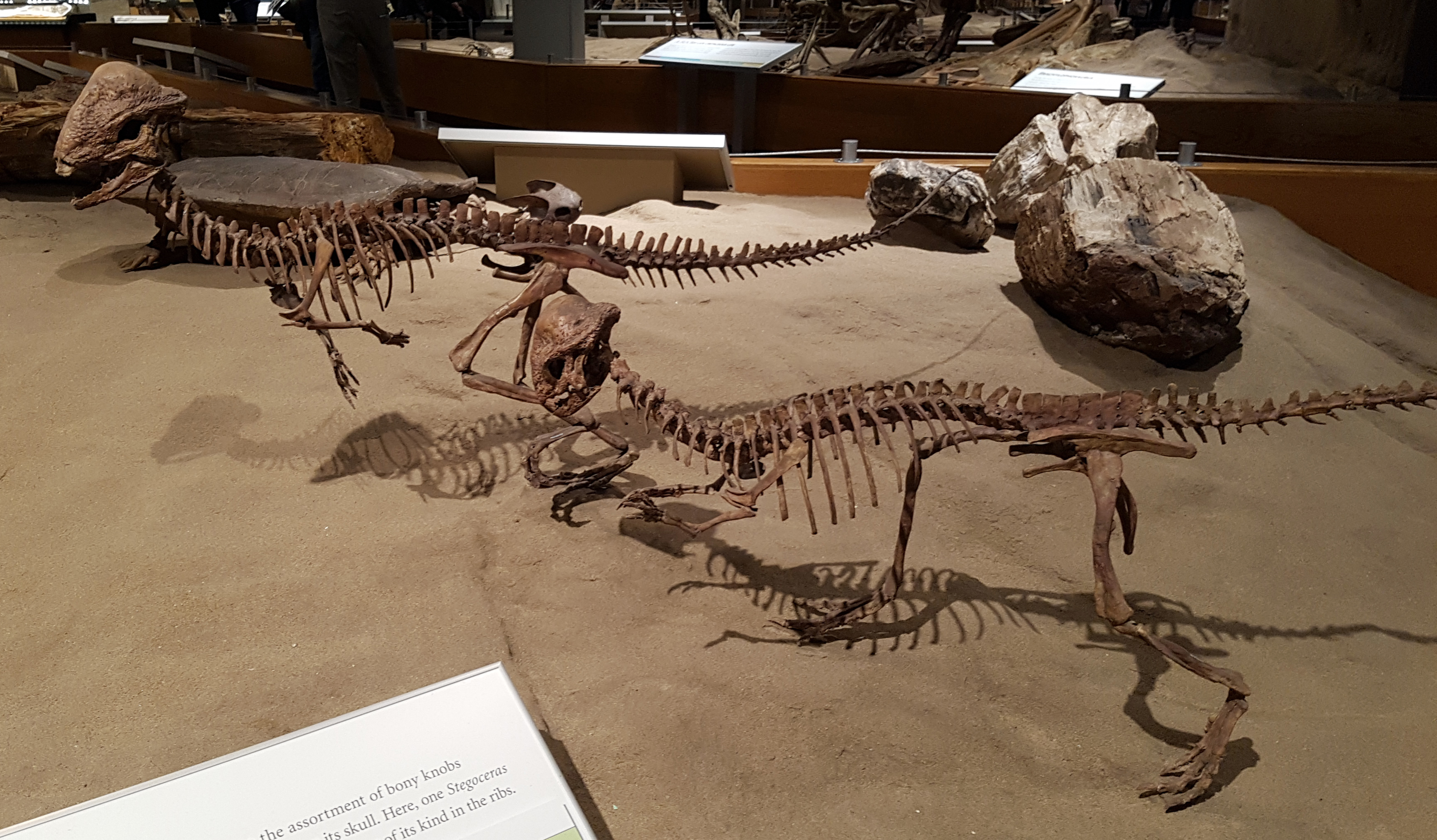
- A collection of ornithischian skeletons (clockwise from top left): Triceratops (Ceratopsia), Heterodontosaurus (Heterodontosauridae), Edmontosaurus (Ornithopoda), Stegoceras (Pachycephalosauria), Europelta (Ankylosauria), and Stegosaurus (Stegosauria).

Scientific classification
- Kingdom: Animalia
- Phylum: Chordata
- Class: Reptilia
- Clade: Dinosauria
- Clade: †Ornithischia; Seeley, 1888

Subgroups
- †Chilesaurus?
- †Pisanosaurus?
- †Silesauridae? (paraphyletic?)
- †Saphornithischia Madzia et al., 2021
  - †Archaeocursor
  - †Eocursor
  - †Laquintasaura?
  - †Lesothosaurus
  - †Heterodontosauridae
  - †Genasauria Sereno, 1986
    - †Serendipaceratops
    - †Thyreophora
    - †Neornithischia
Dubious ornithischians
- †Alocodon
- †Fabrosaurus
- †Ferganocephale
- †Gongbusaurus?
- †Laosaurus
- †Notoceratops
- †Syngonosaurus
- †Tichosteus
- †Trimucrodon

Synonyms
- Orthopoda Cope, 1866; Therosauria Haeckel, 1866; Ornithocephala Bunzel, 1871; Prionodontia Owen, 1874; Omosauria Seeley, 1888; Predentata Marsh, 1894; Postpubici Jaekel, 1910; Praedentata Jaekel, 1910; Phytophagi Jaekel, 1914; Avipelviens Kuhn, 1964; Praedenta Glut, 1997; Onnithischia Buccholz, 2002

= Ornithischia =

Ornithischia Temporal range: Early Jurassic–Late Cretaceous, 200.91–66 Ma (Possible Triassic record)

Extinct clade of primarily herbivorous dinosaurs

Ornithischia (/ˌɔːrnəˈθɪski.ə/) is an extinct clade of mainly herbivorous dinosaurs characterized by a pelvic structure superficially similar to that of birds. The name Ornithischia, or "bird-hipped", reflects this similarity and is derived from the Greek stem ornith- (ὀρνιθ-), meaning "bird", and ischion (ἴσχιον), (Note: plural ischia) meaning "hip". However, as birds are theropod dinosaurs, they are only distantly related to this group.

Ornithischians with well-known anatomical adaptations include the ceratopsians or "horn-faced" dinosaurs (e.g. Triceratops), the pachycephalosaurs or "thick-headed" dinosaurs, the armored dinosaurs (Thyreophora) such as stegosaurs and ankylosaurs, and the ornithopods. There is strong evidence that certain groups of ornithischians lived in herds, often segregated by age group, with juveniles forming their own flocks separate from adults. Some were at least partially covered in filamentous (hair- or feather- like) pelts, and there is much debate over whether these filaments found in specimens of Tianyulong, Psittacosaurus, and Kulindadromeus may have been primitive feathers.

== Description ==
Ornithischia is a very large and diverse group of dinosaurs, with members known from all continents, habitats, and a very large range of sizes. They are primarily herbivorous browsers or grazers, but some members may have also been opportunistic omnivores. Ornithischians have multiple features of the skull, teeth, and skeleton in common, including especially the presence of a predentary and palpebral, an increased number of sacral vertebrae, the absence of gastralia, and an opisthopubic pubis. Early ornithischians ranged around 1–2 m (3.3–6.6 ft) in length, with them increasing in size over time so that the largest armoured ornithischians were around 7.5 m (25 ft) and 9 t (8.9 long tons; 9.9 short tons), the largest horned ornithischians were around 8.5 m (28 ft) and 11 t (11 long tons; 12 short tons), and the largest crested ornithischians were around 15 m (49 ft) and 13.5 t (13.3 long tons; 14.9 short tons).

Early ornithischians were relatively small dinosaurs, averaging about 1–2 meters in body length, with a triangular skull that had large circular orbits on the sides. This suggests that early ornithischians had relatively huge eyes that faced laterally. Early ornithischians possessed forelimbs that were considerably shorter than their hindlimbs. Small forelimbs such as those present in early ornithischians would not have been useful for locomotion, and it is evident that early ornithischians were bipedal dinosaurs. The entire skeleton was lightly built, with a largely fenestrated skull and a very stout neck and trunk. The tail is nearly half of the dinosaurs' overall length; their long tails presumably acted as a counterbalance, and as a compensating mechanism for shifts in the creature's center of gravity. The hindlimbs of early ornithischians show that their tibia was considerably longer than their femur, a feature that suggests that early ornithischians were adapted for bipedality, and were fast runners.

=== Skulls ===
Skulls of several early diverging ornithischians

Much of the knowledge of early ornithischian anatomy comes from Lesothosaurus, which is a taxon known from multiple skulls and skeletons from the Early Jurassic of Lesotho. The rear of its skull is box-like, while the snout tapers to a point. The nasal opening is small, the antorbital fossa that opens from the side of the skull into the palate is large, shallow and triangular, the orbit is large and round and has a palpebral creating a brow, and the lower jaw has a large mandibular fenestra.

The skulls of Emausaurus and Scelidosaurus, two early members of the armoured group Thyreophora, show similarities in the box-like skull that tapers to the front. The antorbital fossa is smaller and forming an elongate oval in both taxa, and the palpebral which is elongate and slender in Lesothosaurus is widened in Emausaurus and completely incorporated into the skull as a flat bone in Scelidosaurus. Skulls in members of the thyreophoran group Stegosauria are much longer and lower, with the width at the back being greater than the height in Stegosaurus. The snout and lower jaw are long and deep, and in some genera the premaxilla does not have any teeth. As in Scelidosaurus, the palpebral forms the top border of the orbit as a flat brow bone, but the antorbital fossa is reduced to the point of absence in some genera.

Ankylosaurs, the other group of armoured ornithischians, have very robust, immobile skulls, with three significant features that separate them from other groups. The antorbital fossa, supratemporal fenestra and mandibular fenestra are all closed, the sutures separating skull bones are almost completely obliterated by surface texturing, and there is bony armour above the orbits, and at the top and bottom corners of the back of the skull. Teeth are sometimes absent from the premaxilla, and both the upper and lower jaws have deeply inset teeth creating large cheeks. Ankylosaurs also have very extensive and complicated network of sinuses, formed by bone growth in the palate.

The skulls are known from many early ornithopods and some heterodontosaurids, showing similar general features. Skulls are relatively tall with shorter snouts, but the snout is elongated in some later taxa like Thescelosaurus. The orbit and antorbital fossa are large, but the nasal opening is small, and while teeth are present in the premaxilla, there is a toothless front tip that likely formed a keratinous beak. The premaxillary teeth and the first lower tooth in Heterodontosaurus are enlarged into sizeable canines. In later ornithopods, the skulls are more elongate and sometimes fully rectangular, with a very large nasal opening, and a thin, elongate palpebral that can extend the entire way across the orbit. Teeth are almost always absent from the premaxilla, the antorbital fossa is reduced and round to slit-like, the tip of the snout is sometimes flared to form a broad beak. Members of the ornithopod family Hadrosauridae show further adaptations, including the formation of dental batteries where teeth are continuously replaced, and in many genera the development of prominent cranial crests formed by multiple different bones of the skull.

Pachycephalosauria, at one time thought to be close to ornithopods and now known to be related instead to ceratopsians, show a unique skull anatomy that is unlike any other ornithischian. The bones of the top of the skull are thickened and in many taxa expanded significantly to form round bony domes as the top of the head, as well as possessing small nodes or elongate spikes along the back edge of the skull. Many taxa are only known from these thick skull domes, which are fused from the frontal and parietal bones. As in many other ornithischians, the snout is short and tapering, the nasal opening is small, the antorbital fossa is sometimes absent, and there are premaxillary teeth, though only three. The two palpebrals are also incorporated into the skull roof as in thyreophorans, rather than free.

Ceratopsians, the sister group to pachycephalosaurs, also display many cranial adaptations, most importantly the evolution of a bone called the rostral that forms the top beak opposite the predentary. The jugal bones flare to the sides to create a pentagonal skull seen from above, the nasal opening is closer to the top of the snout than the teeth, and while the snout tapers in some taxa, it is very deep and short in Psittacosaurus. The ceratopsian palpebral is generally triangular, and the back edge of the skull roof forms a flat frill that is enlarged in more derived ceratopsians. The ceratopsian family Ceratopsidae progresses on these features with the addition of horns above each orbit and on the top of the snout, as well as substantial elongation of the frill and in many genera the development of two large parietal fenestrae forming holes in the frill. The skull and frill elongation makes the skulls of Torosaurus and Pentaceratops the largest of any known terrestrial vertebrate, at over 2 m (6.6 ft) long.

=== "Bird-hip" ===
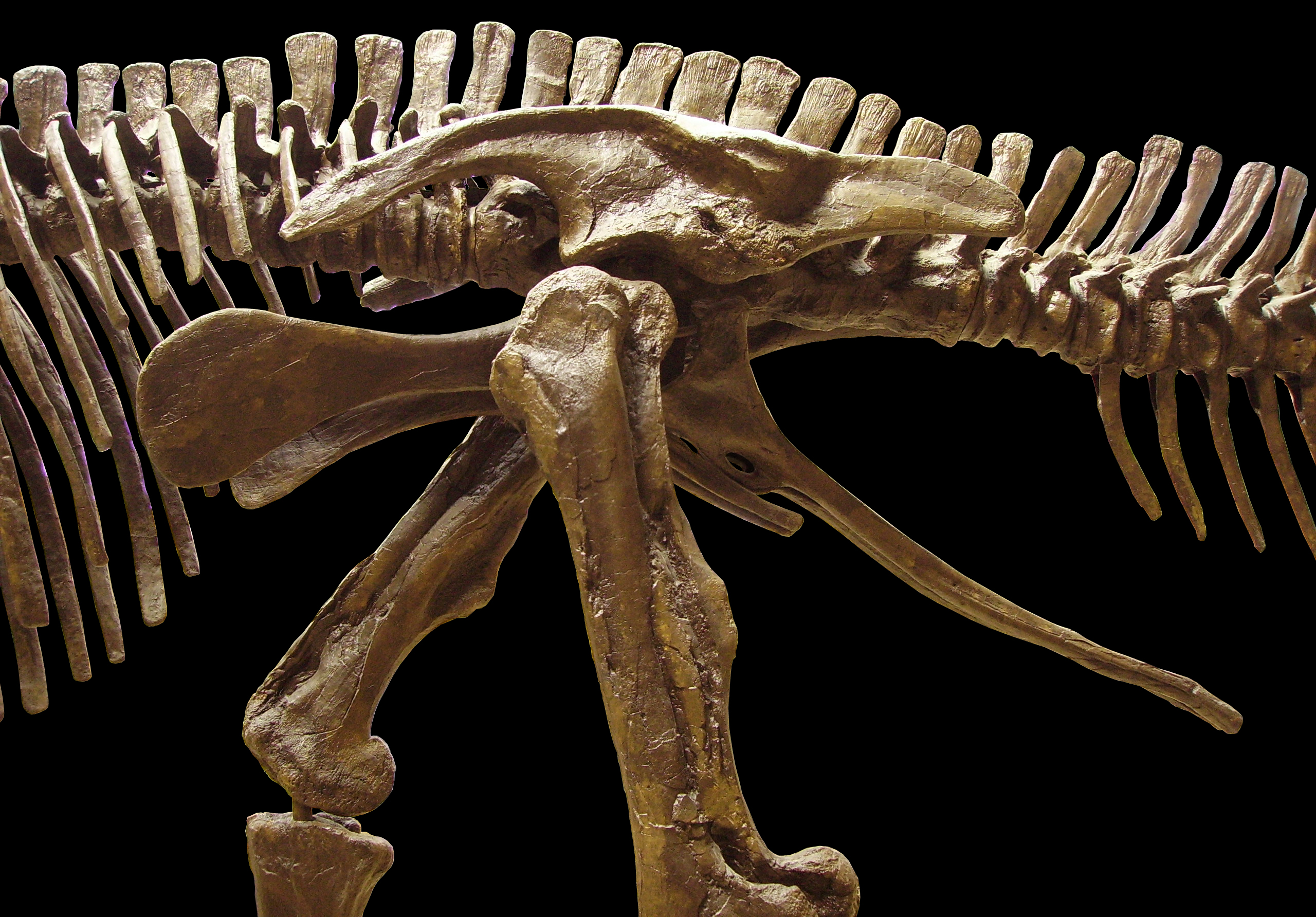
Pelvis of Edmontosaurus, showing the characteristic ornithischian shape

The ornithischian pelvis was "opisthopubic", meaning that the pubis pointed down and backwards (posterior), parallel with the ischium, while in the saurischian pelvis, the pelvis jutted forwards as in lizards. This resulted in a four-pronged pelvic structure. In contrast to this, the saurischian pelvis was "propubic", meaning the pubis pointed toward the head (anterior), as in ancestral reptiles (Figure 1b).

The opisthopubic pelvis independently evolved at least three times in dinosaurs (in ornithischians, birds and therizinosauroids). Some argue that the opisthopubic pelvis evolved a fourth time, in the clade Dromaeosauridae, but this is controversial, as other authors argue that dromaeosaurids are mesopubic. It has also been argued that the opisthopubic condition is basal to maniraptorans (including among others birds, therizinosauroids and dromaeosaurids), with some clades having later experienced a reversal to the propubic condition.

=== Integument ===
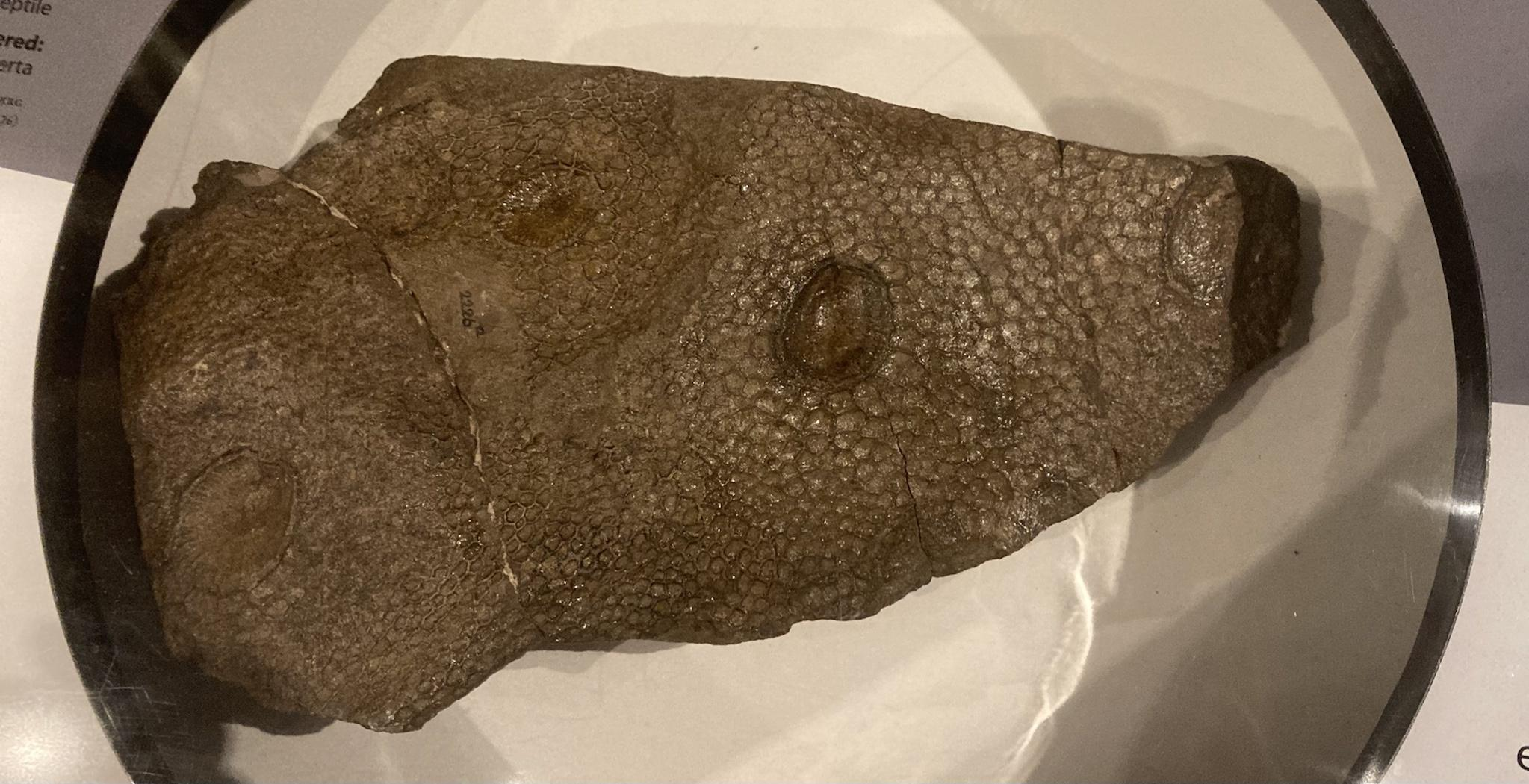
Cast of preserved Corythosaurus skin, showing small arrays of basement scales interspersed with large feature scales

Exceptionally preserved specimens of ornithischians preserved integument, the external tissues scuh as skin, scales, and filaments. Many ornithischians are known to have been covered in scales, similar to those of other dinosaurs. Unlike the overlapping scales of modern lizards, typical ornithischian scales are mosaics of non-overlapping "basement scales", small and of polygonal shape. In many species, larger feature scales would be interspersed between these basement scales. An especially abundant record of these scales is known from hadrosaurid mummies, where distinct patterns of scalation can be observed between species. Other large ornithischians such as ceratopsids, ankylosaurs, iguanodontids and stegosaurs are also known from traces or preserved scales. Several other types of scalation are found on localized parts of the body in specific taxa. For some examples, hadrosaurs possess "midline feature scales" running along the top of the animal, Kulindadromeus and Haolong possess large overlapping scales over the tail, and reticulate scales have been documented on hands and feet of ceratopsids and Kulindadromeus. In Psittacosaurus and Borealopelta, the melanosomes of especially well preserved scales have been used to approximate their colour in life. Some portions of the body would have instead been covered in hard keratin like that found on the claws and beaks of modern birds and reptiles. Examples of these include beaks, the nails on the hands and feet, the horns of horned dinosaurs, the plates of stegosaurs, and the armour of ankylosaurs. The osteoderms found in armored dinosaurs would have been embedded externally within the skin, and covered much of the animal.

Despite similarities in external scalation, differences in skin thickness can be observed between ornithischians. The small ceratopsian Psittacosaurus had skin 1 centimetre (0.39 in) thick, close to the skin thickness of modern rhinos and elephants, whereas large hadrosaurs had especially thin skin only 0.3 centimetres (0.12 in) thick unlike mammalian megafauna.

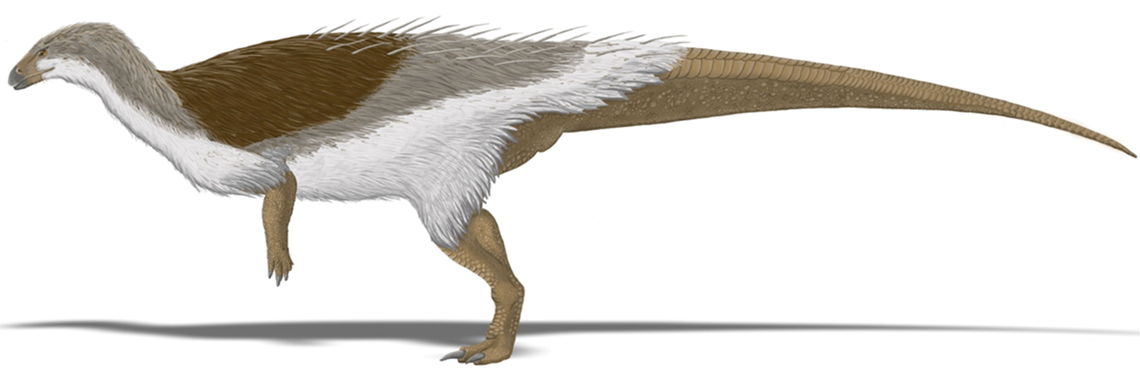
Some ornithischians were covered in a mixture of scales, filaments, and quill-like structures; here, Thescelosaurus is depicted with integument inferred from other species

Ornithischians are also known to have possessed quill, spike, and filament-like structures. Due to being more rarely preserved, their distribution across the group remains more unclear. A specimen of Psittacosaurus, otherwise covered in typical scalation, preserves a series of long upward-pointing bristles along the tail of the animal. Likely tubular in life, they are rooted in the skin in clusters. Extensive filaments are known from the heterodontosaurid Tianyulong and the neornithischian Kulindadromeus. Though similar to the bristles of Psittacosaurus, those of Tianyulong are denser and preserved under the neck and over the back in addition to the tail. These are similar to the shorter unbranched filaments seen in theropods such as Sinosauropteryx. In Kulindadromeus, more complex filaments are known in addition to unbranched structures. On the limbs, several small filaments branch out of basal plates (possibly scales), similar to downy feathers which lack barbules. Similarly clustered ribbon-like feathers occur on the lower leg. Thusfar, these constitute the only complex filament structures known in ornithischians. Filaments are lacking from the ends of the limbs as well as most of the tail, which are instead scaled. The hadrosauroid dinosaur Haolong preserves small, thin "cutaneous spikes" of various sizes across the body. Unlike feathers and mammalian hair, these hollow structures were composed of living cells. These were present along the neck and torso and coexisted with basement scales, whilst the tail was strictly scaly. Whether all, some, or none of these structures share an evolutionary origin with bird feathers continues to be a matter of debate. Some favor an independent origin, with the earliest dinosaurs being scaled, while other authors favor filaments being present in the earliest dinosaurs or even in the common ancestors of pterosaurs and dinosaurs which subsequently evolved into distinct structures in various lineages.

== Classification ==
=== History ===
The general pelvis of Ornithischia (left) and Saurischia (right) illustrating the differences highlighted by Seeley (1888) as justifying their independent evolution

The first recognition of an herbivorous group of dinosaurs was named Orthopoda in 1866 by Edward Drinker Cope, a name that is now recognized as a synonym of Ornithischia. Discussions on the taxonomy of dinosaurs by Othniel Charles Marsh identified two major groups of herbivorous dinosaurs, Ornithopoda and Stegosauria, containing genera from a broad geographic and stratigraphic distribution. While often these groups were placed within Dinosauria, Harry Govier Seeley suggested instead in 1888 that ornithopods and stegosaurs, which shared many features in the skull, limbs, and hip, were unrelated to other dinosaurs, and so he proposed that Dinosauria was an unnatural grouping of two independently-evolved suborders, Saurischia and Ornithischia. It is from the anatomy of the hip that Seeley chose the name Ornithischia, referencing the bird-like anatomy of the ischium bone. Many researchers did not follow the division of Seeley at first, with Marsh naming the group Predentata to unite ornithopods, stegosaurs, and Ceratopsia within Dinosauria, but with additional work and new discoveries the unnatural nature of Dinosauria came to be accepted, and the names Seeley proposed found common use. After further decades, in 1974 Robert T. Bakker and Peter M. Galton provided new evidence in support of the grouping of ornithischians and saurischians together within a natural Dinosauria, which has been supported since.

The first cladistic studies on Ornithischia were published simultaneously in 1984 by David B. Norman, Andrew R. Milner, and Paul C. Sereno. These studies differed somewhat in their results, but found that Iguanodon was closer to hadrosaurs than other ornithopods, followed by Dryosaurus, Hypsilophodon and then Lesothosaurus and its relatives. While the study of Norman placed ceratopsians between Hypsilophodon and more derived ornithopods, the study of Sereno placed ceratopsians with ankylosaurs and stegosaurs. It has since been recognized by that ceratopsians are closer to ornithopods than the armoured ankylosaurs and stegosaurs, but the relationships of some groups are still in states of change, with some more consistent results than others. An early study that looked at the relationships within Ornithischia with greater detail was that of Sereno in 1986, who provided features that supported the evolution of all ornithischian groups and shared similarities with earlier studies. Sereno found that Lesothosaurus was the most primitive ornithischian, with all other ornithischians united within the clade Genasauria, which has two subgroups. The first subgroup, Thyreophora, unites ankylosaurs and stegosaurs along with more primitive taxa like Scelidosaurus, while the second subgroup, Cerapoda, contained ornithopods, ceratopsians, pachycephalosaurs, and small primitive forms. One group of the small primitive forms considered to be cerapodans by Sereno, Heterodontosauridae, has since been found to be a group of very early ornithischians of similar evolutionary status as Lesothosaurus, although this result is not definitive.

The first large-scale numerical analysis of the phylogenetics of Ornithischia was published in 2008 by Richard J. Butler and colleagues, including many primitive ornithischians and members from all of the major subgroups, to test some of the hypotheses given previously about ornithischian evolution and the relationships of the groups. Thyreophora was found to be a supported group, as well as the clade of pachycephalosaurs and ceratopsians that Sereno named Marginocephalia in 1986. Some taxa considered earlier to be ornithopods, like heterodontosaurids, Agilisaurus, Hexinlusaurus and Othnielia, were instead found to be outside of both Ornithopoda and Ceratopsia, but still closer to those two groups than thyreophorans. The early Argentinian taxon Pisanosaurus was found to be the most primitive ornithischian, but while overall results agreed with earlier studies and showed some stability, areas of the evolutionary tree were found to be problematic, and with potential for later change. In 2021, a new phylogenetic study was published authored by Paul-Emile Dieudonné and colleagues that instead found Heterodontosauridae to nest alongside Pachycephalosauria within Marginocephalia, changing the early evolution of ornithopods considerably, and showing that the evolution of ornithischians was far from definitive. Below are the cladograms of Sereno, Butler and colleagues, and Dieudonné and colleagues, restricted to the major clades of Ornithischia, Heterodontosauridae, Lesothosaurus and Pisanosaurus.

Sereno, 1986

- Ornithischia
  - Lesothosaurus
  - Genasauria
    - Thyreophora
      - Stegosauria
      - Ankylosauria
    - Cerapoda
      - Marginocephalia
        - Pachycephalosauria
        - Ceratopsia
      - Euornithopoda
        - Heterodontosauria
        - Ornithopoda

Butler et al., 2008

- Ornithischia
  - Pisanosaurus
  - - Heterodontosauridae
    - Genasauria
      - Thyreophora
        - Lesothosaurus
        - - Stegosauria
          - Ankylosauria
      - Neornithischia
        - - Cerapoda
            - Ornithopoda
            - Marginocephalia
              - Pachycephalosauria
              - Ceratopsia

Dieudonné et al., 2021

- Ornithischia
  - Lesothosaurus
  - - - Thyreophora
        - Stegosauria
        - Ankylosauria
    - - Cerapoda
        - Ornithopoda
        - Marginocephalia
          - Ceratopsia
          - Pachycephalosauria (incl. heterodontosaurids)

=== Subgroups ===
When Ornithischia was first named, Seeley united the orders Ornithopoda and Stegosauria of Marsh's taxonomy within the new group. Ceratopsia was then recognized as a unique group related to ornithopods and stegosaurs by Marsh by 1894, with each of the three suborders still being recognized as distinct groups today. Ceratopsians are recognized as group that grew in diversity later in the Cretaceous after evolving in the Late Jurassic, encompassing a diverse array of bodyforms from the small, bipedal Psittacosaurus up to the very large, quadrupedal, horned and frilled ceratopsids like Torosaurus, which has the longest skull of any terrestrial vertebrate. Ornithopods, which range from the Early Jurassic in some studies until the end of the Cretaceous with continuous diversity, are generally bipedal and unarmoured, though some later groups like Hadrosauridae evolved complex dental anatomy in the form of batteries of teeth. Stegosaurs are comparatively limited, restricted to a primarily Jurassic group of moderate to large, quadrupedal herbivores with two rows of vertical plates ornamenting their spine, which possibly did not go extinct until the Late Cretaceous, though at the time of Marsh Stegosauria was used for all armored and quadrupedal taxa, many of which are now separated into Ankylosauria. Ankylosaurs were only recognized as a distinct group from stegosaurs in the 1920s despite many members being known for decades before, with the group now encompassing a broad array of heavy, quadrupedal ornithischians with extensive armour covering their body and skull. The fifth recognized major subgroup of ornithischians is Pachycephalosauria, which was first named in 1974 after being confused for a long time with the theropod Troodon on account of their similarly omnivorous and unique teeth. Pachycephalosaurians are unique for their tall, thickened skulls and small, bipedal bauplan, suggesting that their domes were for sexual display or combat in the form of head-butting or flank-butting. Some taxa, particularly those at one point grouped together in the ornithopod family Hypsilophodontidae, are now recognized to not fall within any of the major ornithischian groups, and either be outside Genasauria, or on the basal stem of Neornithischia outside Cerapoda.

Following the publication of the PhyloCode to provide rules and regulations on the use of taxonomic names for groups, the internal classification of Ornithischia was revised by Daniel Madzia and colleagues in 2021 to provide a framework of definitions and taxa for other studies to follow and modify from. They names the new clade Saphornithischia to unite heterodontosaurids with more derived ornithischians to encompass the concept of the well-supported clear ornithischians, as the origins of the group and the relationships of primitive taxa like Pisanosaurus and members of Silesauridae may sometimes be found to be ornithischians outside this core grouping. Madzia and colleagues also provided a composite cladogram of Ornithischia to illustrate the consensus of internal divisions, which can be seen below. Ornithischia has been defined as all taxa closer to Iguanodon than Allosaurus or Camarasaurus. Genasauria has been defined as the smallest clade containing Ankylosaurus, Iguanodon, Stegosaurus, and Triceratops.

- Ornithischia
  - Heterodontosaurus tucki (Heterodontosauridae)
  - Genasauria
    - Thyreophora
      - Stegosauria
        - Huayangosaurus taibaii (Huayangosauridae)
        - Stegosaurus stenops (Stegosauridae)
      - Ankylosauria
        - Mymoorapelta maysi
        - - Nodosauridae
            - Polacanthus foxii (Polacanthinae)
            - Nodosaurinae
              - Nodosaurus textilis
              - - Panoplosaurus mirus (Panoplosaurini)
                - Struthiosaurus austriacus (Struthiosaurini)
          - Ankylosauridae
            - Hylaeosaurus armatus
            - - Shamosaurinae
                - Gobisaurus domoculus
                - Shamosaurus scutatus
              - Ankylosaurinae
                - Pinacosaurus grangeri
                - - Saichania chulsanensis
                  - Ankylosaurus magniventris (Ankylosaurini)
    - Neornithischia
      - Jeholosaurus shangyuanensis (Jeholosauridae)
      - - - Thescelosauridae
            - Orodromeus makelai (Orodrominae)
            - Thescelosaurus neglectus (Thescelosaurinae)
        - - Hypsilophodon foxii (Hypsilophodontidae)
          - Cerapoda
            - Marginocephalia
              - - Pachycephalosauria
                  - Stegoceras validum
                  - - Pachycephalosaurinae
                      - Sphaerotholus goodwini
                      - Pachycephalosaurus wyomingensis (Pachycephalosaurini)
              - - Ceratopsia
                  - Psittacosaurus mongoliensis
                  - Chaoyangsaurus youngi (Chaoyangsauridae)
                  - Neoceratopsia
                    - Leptoceratops gracilis (Leptoceratopsidae)
                    - Coronosauria
                      - Protoceratops andrewsi (Protoceratopsidae)
                      - Ceratopsidae
                        - Ceratops montanus
                        - Chasmosaurinae
                          - Chasmosaurus belli
                          - - Anchiceratops ornatus
                            - - Arrhinoceratops brachyops
                              - Triceratops horridus (Triceratopsini)
                        - Centrosaurinae
                          - Nasutoceratops titusi (Nasutoceratopsini)
                          - Eucentrosaura
                            - Centrosaurus apertus (Centrosaurini)
                            - Pachyrhinosaurini
                              - Achelousaurus horneri
                              - Pachyrhinosaurus canadensis
            - Ornithopoda
              - Elasmaria
                - Gasparinisaura cincosaltensis
                - Macrogryphosaurus gondwanicus
                - Talenkauen santacrucensis
              - Iguanodontia
                - - Rhabdodontidae
                    - Rhabdodon priscus
                    - Zalmoxes robustus
                - - Tenontosaurus tilletti
                  - Dryomorpha
                    - Dryosaurus altus (Dryosauridae)
                    - Ankylopollexia
                      - Camptosaurus dispar (Camptosauridae)
                      - Styracosterna
                        - Hypselospinus fittoni
                        - Hadrosauriformes
                          - Iguanodon bernissartensis (Iguanodontidae)
                          - Hadrosauroidea
                            - Probactrosaurus gobiensis
                            - Hadrosauridae
                              - Hadrosaurus foulkii (Hadrosaurinae)
                              - Saurolophus osborni (Saurolophinae)
                              - Lambeosaurus lambei (Lambeosaurinae)

Multiple taxa within Ornithischia fall around the origin of the group, or cannot be classified definitively. Lesothosaurus and Laquintasaura have been found as basal thyreophorans or basal ornithischians, Chilesaurus is either a theropod or a basal ornithischian, Pisanosaurus has been found as a basal ornithischian or a non-ornithischian silesaurid, Eocursor has been a basal ornithischian or a basal member of Neornithischia, Serendipaceratops cannot be classified beyond Ornithischia as it is either an ankylosaur or a ceratopsian, and Alocodon, Fabrosaurus, Ferganocephale, Gongbusaurus, Taveirosaurus, Trimucrodon and Xiaosaurus are dubious ornithischians of uncertain basal classification. Depending on the phylogenetic results, Silesauridae could either be a clade within Ornithischia, its members could form an evolutionary gradient, or some members found form a clade while others are part of a gradient.

=== Evolution ===
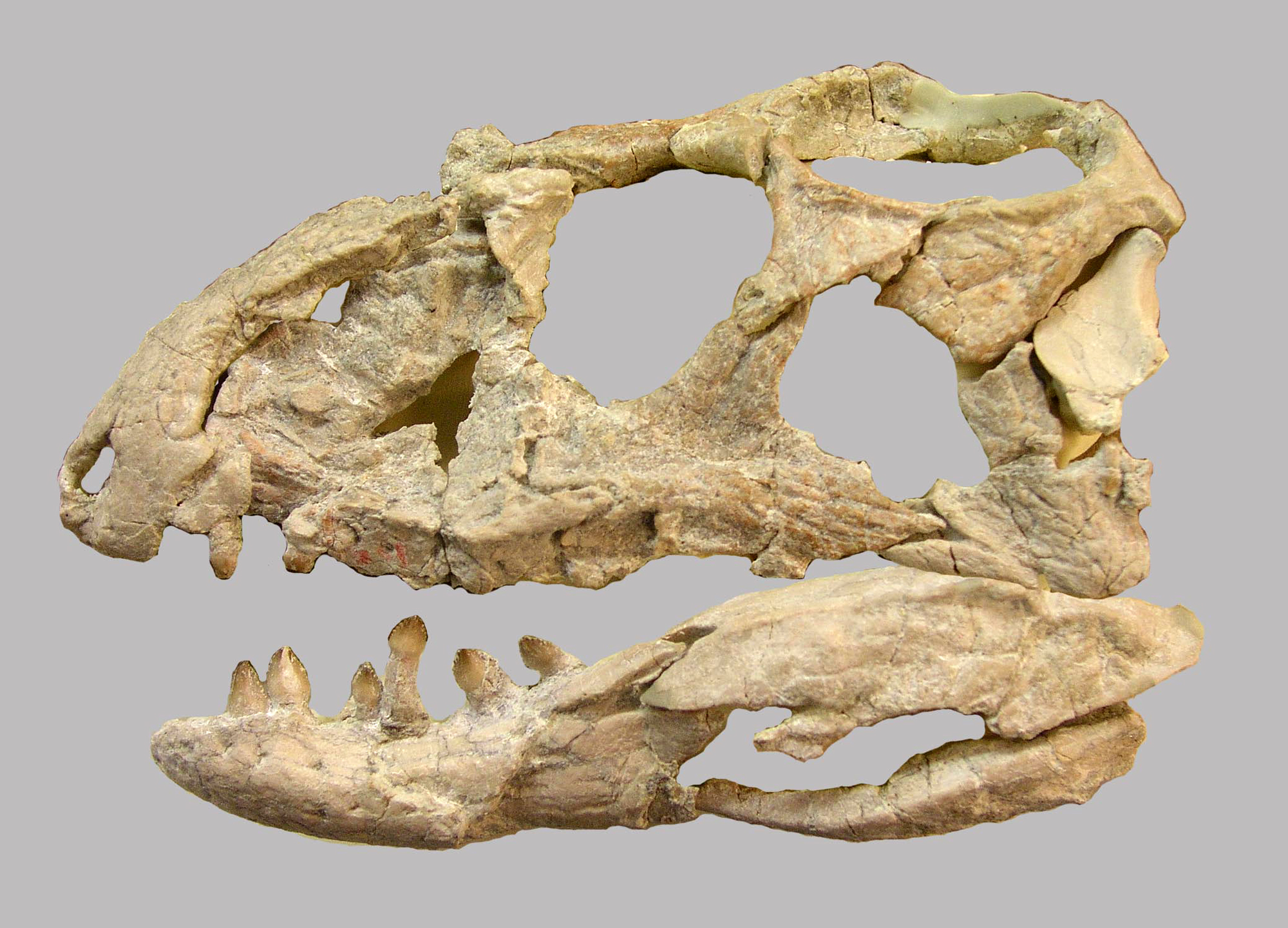
Skull of Revueltosaurus, a genus originally considered an early ornithischian based on its teeth

For a long time, the only understanding of the origins of Ornithischia came from Lesothosaurus and Pisanosaurus, which together represented the best-known Early Jurassic and Triassic ornithischians respectively. Many suggestions of taxa and specimens that could be referred to Ornithischia from the Triassic were based on teeth and jaw bones, as they showed similar adaptations for herbivory. The genera Revueltosaurus, Galtonia, Pekinosaurus, Tecovasaurus, Lucianosaurus, Protecovasaurus, Crosbysaurus, and Azendohsaurus were all at one time considered to be Triassic ornithischians with only their teeth known, but are now recognized to be completely unrelated. The only early ornithischians that were considered to be diagnostic in a 2004 review by Norman and colleagues were Lesothosaurus, Pisanosaurus and Technosaurus, limiting the early ornithischian record to only two Triassic genera from Argentina and the United States and one Early Jurassic genus from South Africa, with all the tooth taxa being considered undiagnostic. Referrals of isolated teeth to Ornithischia based on herbivorous features began to be extensively questioned by William G. Parker and colleagues in 2005 after the discovery of skull and skeleton material clearly from Revueltosaurus showing that the "ornithischian-like" teeth were from an animal more closely related to crocodiles than birds, and there were multiple occurrences of herbivory throughout Triassic reptiles. Removing the list of Triassic tooth taxa from Ornithischia, the early diversity of the group was substantially reduced, especially in comparison to the known Triassic diversity of theropods and sauropodomorphs. If Pisanosaurus represented the earliest ornithischian, there would be at least a 20 million year gap in the evolution of Ornithischia until Lesothosaurus and heterodontosaurids. It is possible that the limited early record of ornithischians is due to them inhabiting environments that were less conducive to fossilization, or that the phylogenetics of the group were incorrect and that early ornithischians were already known but identified as members of other groups.

Possible evolutionary relationships of Ornithischia

- - Silesauridae
  - Dinosauria
    - Saurischia
      - Sauropodomorpha
      - Theropoda
    - Ornithischia

- - Silesauridae
  - Dinosauria
    - Sauropodomorpha
    - Ornithoscelida
      - Theropoda
      - Ornithischia

First noted in the 2003 naming of the early taxon Silesaurus, some taxa generally considered non-dinosaurs show similarities to ornithischians in the teeth and jaw anatomy. These basal taxa, which were then grouped within Silesauridae and commonly as the sister group to Dinosauria, may instead be the earliest ornithischians. They show adaptations for the evolution of herbivory, and can fill in the gap in early evolution of ornithischians that were otherwise only clearly known since the beginning of the Jurassic. This hypothesis has found support in multiple different phylogenetic analyses, but the results are not yet accepted as definitive enough to contradict other possible evolutionary strategies of dinosaurs. Alternatively, and more in line with earlier studies on dinosaur evolution, silesaurids may be the sister taxa to the Saurischia-Ornithischia split, or even other arrangements of the three main dinosaur groups Ornithischia, Sauropodomorpha, and Theropoda. The 2017 phylogenetic study of Matthew G. Baron and colleagues suggested that instead of a Saurischia-Ornithischia split, ornithischians were instead closest to theropods in the clade Ornithoscelida, with sauropodomorphs being outside the grouping. Under this case, the omnivory in the earliest sauropodomorphs and ornithischians would be the ancestral condition for dinosaurs, along with the grasping abilities seen in the earliest ornithischians and theropods. While Ornithoscelida is a possible hypothesis for the evolution of dinosaurs and the close relationships of Ornithischia, follow-up studies have not found it statistically more likely than the traditional dichotomy of Ornithischia and Saurischia, or the third alternative, Phytodinosauria, where ornithischians and sauropodomorphs are closer to each other than theropods.

Along with Pisanosaurus, which was supported as the earliest ornithischian for a time before being considered just as likely to be a silesaur rather than an ornithischian, an additional problematic taxon is Chilesaurus from the Late Jurassic of Chile. While it was originally named as a derived theropod with unique anatomy, it was found in studies based on Baron and colleagues results to instead be either the basalmost ornithischian, or a sauropodomorph. As the earliest ornithischian, Chilesaurus tied multiple details of ornithischian and theropod anatomy together supporting their union in Ornithoscelida, though when it is not the basalmost ornithischian, a traditional Saurischia is recovered. The problematic nature of Chilesaurus requires further revisiting of its anatomy, but the details of vertebral air pockets, pelvis shape, and hand support it as a theropod. Daemonosaurus, typically a theropod or close relative of herrerasaurs, has also been found as the basalmost ornithischian at times when Ornithoscelida is recovered, but it does not share any unique features with ornithischians and redescribing its anatomy found it fairly confidently to be a basal dinosaur not related closely to Ornithischia.

The phylogenetic analysis of Norman and colleagues in 2022 recovered the members of Silesauridae as forming an ancestral grade within Ornithischia even with the inclusion of Chilesaurus, supporting the earlier results of Müller and Garcia and their evolutionary trends for early ornithischian anatomy. Norman and colleagues used Prionodontia over both Saphornithischia and Genasauria, since all were recovered as encompassing the same node. The earliest ornithischians under this reconstruction were faunivorous, as seen by Lewisuchus, which has typical teeth like theropods. Serrations on teeth become larger for taxa more derived than Asilisaurus, the development of a cingulum in teeth is seen in Technosaurus and later ornithischians, the lower jaw becomes more elongate in taxa above Silesaurus, and core ornithischians are united by the pubic bone angling backwards, and the modification of the ankle joint.

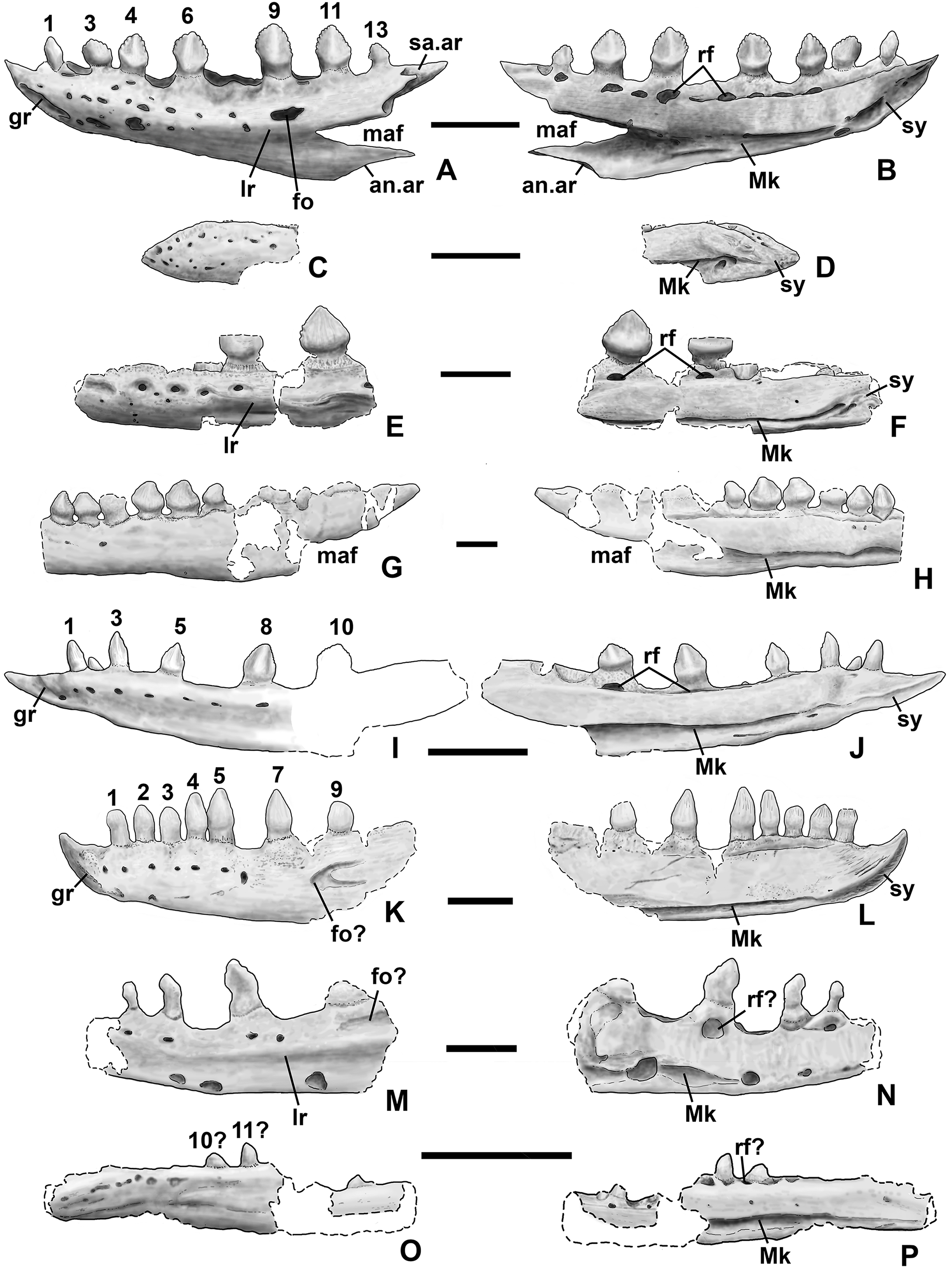
Lower jaws and teeth of (top to bottom) Kwanasaurus, Asilisaurus, Eucoelophysis, Technosaurus, Sacisaurus, Silesaurus, Diodorus scytobrachion and Soumyasaurus

- Dinosauria
  - Saurischia
    - Herrerasauridae
    - - Daemonosaurus
      - - - Chindesaurus
          - Tawa hallae
        - - Eodromaeus
          - - Sauropodomorpha
            - Theropoda
  - Ornithischia
    - Lewisuchus
    - - Soumyasaurus
      - - Asilisaurus
        - - Sulcimentisauria
            - Diodorus scytobrachion
            - - Technosaurus
              - - Parapredentata
                  - - Ignotosaurus
                    - Silesaurus
                  - - - Sacisaurus
                      - - Lutungutali
                        - Kwanasaurus
                    - - Eucoelophysis
                      - - Pisanosaurus
                        - - Laquintasaura
                          - Prionodontia
                            - Thyreophora
                            - Neornithischia

== Palaeoecology ==
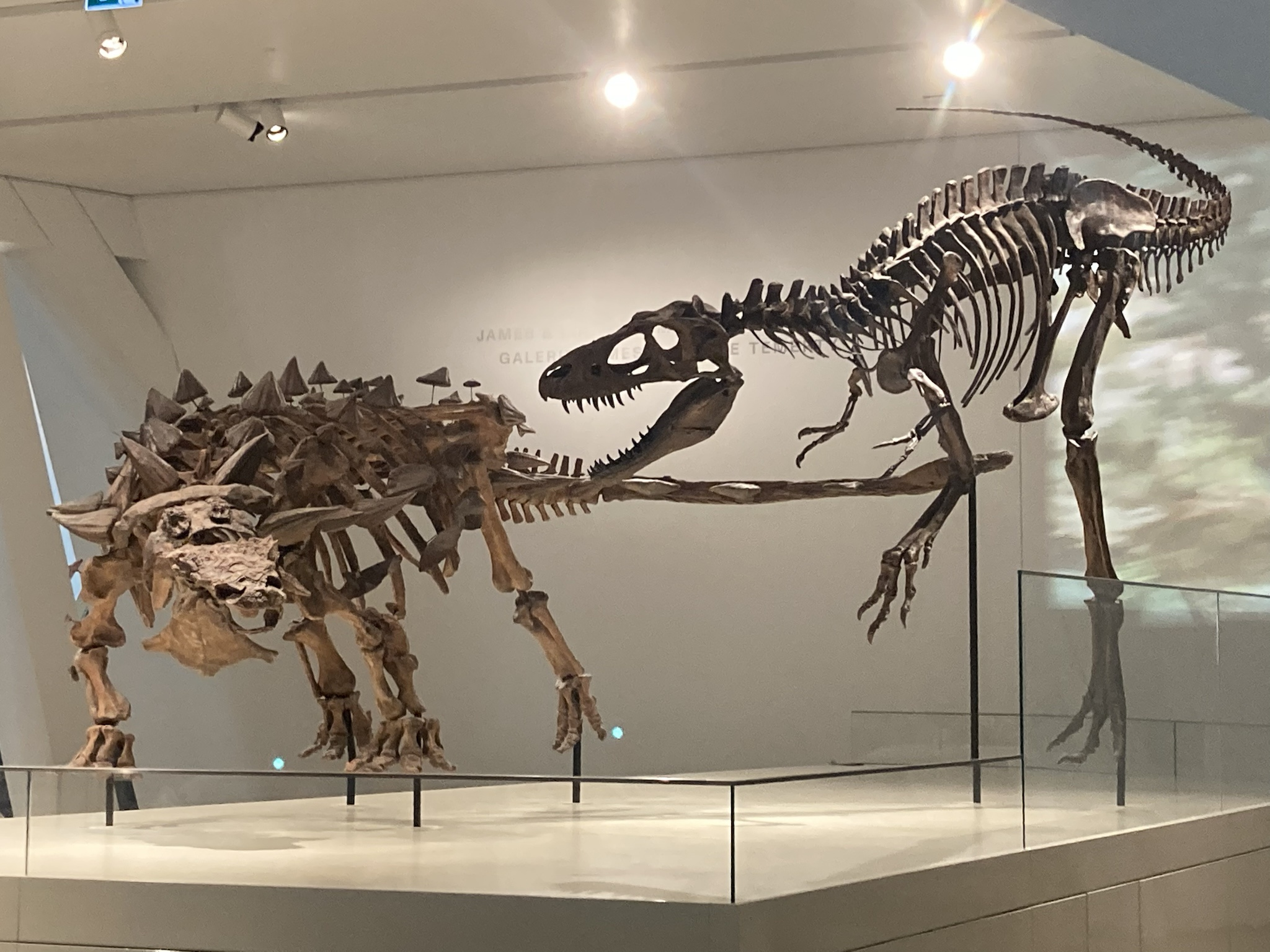
Ornithischians, such as Zuul, would have been preyed on by theropods like Gorgosaurus

Ornithischians shifted from bipedal to quadrupedal posture at least three times in their evolutionary history and it has been shown primitive members may have been capable of both forms of movement.

Most ornithischians were herbivorous. In fact, most of the unifying characters of Ornithischia are thought to be related to this herbivory. For example, the shift to an opisthopubic pelvis is thought to be related to the development of a large stomach or stomachs and gut which would allow ornithischians to more effectively digest plant matter. The smallest known ornithischian is Fruitadens haagarorum. The largest Fruitadens individuals reached just 65–75 cm. Previously, only carnivorous, saurischian theropods were known to reach such small sizes. At the other end of the spectrum, the largest known ornithischians reach about 15 meters (smaller than the largest saurischians).

However, not all ornithischians were strictly herbivorous. Some groups, like the heterodontosaurids, were likely omnivores. At least one species of ankylosaurian, Liaoningosaurus paradoxus, appears to have been at least partially carnivorous, with hooked claws, fork-like teeth, and stomach contents suggesting that it may have fed on fish. The members of Genasauria were primarily herbivores. Genasaurians most often had their head at the level of one meter, which suggests they were feeding primarily on "ground-level plants such as ferns, cycads, and other herbaceous gymnosperms."

There is strong evidence that some ornithischians lived in herds. This evidence consists of multiple bone beds where large numbers of individuals of the same species and of different age groups died simultaneously.
