= Mescalero Ridge =

Escarpment in the southwestern US

- (Mescalero Escarpment)
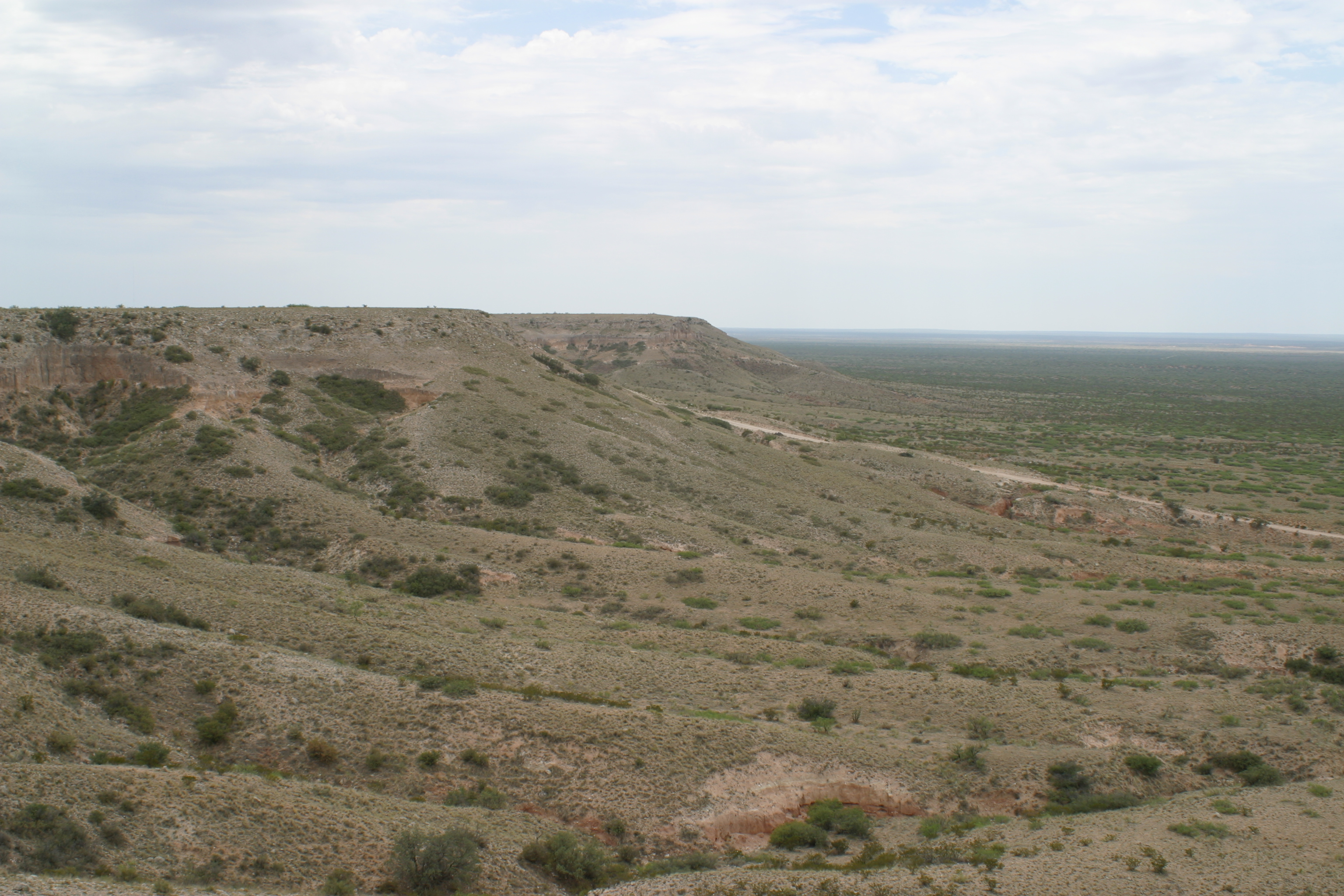
- Escarpment between Caprock and Maljamar

Highest point
- Elevation: 4,462 ft (1,360 m)
- Prominence: 200 ft (61 m)
- Coordinates: 33°02′35″N 103°51′13″W

Geography
- Location within New Mexico
- Location: Location in Eastern New Mexico

Geology
- Rock age: Quaternary
- Mountain type: Caliche

The Mescalero Ridge forms the western edge of the great Llano Estacado, a vast plateau or tableland in the southwestern United States in New Mexico and Texas. It is the western equivalent of the Caprock Escarpment, which defines the eastern edge of the Llano Estacado.

== Mescalero Sands ==
Extending north-south along the western edge of the Mescalero Ridge lies a vast sand sheet called the Mescalero Sands, named after the Mescalero Apaches who once hunted in these sandhills. In 1928, Nelson Horatio Darton of the United States Geological Survey observed: “On the east side of the Pecos Valley in southern New Mexico there are very extensive sand hills formed of deposits known as the ‘Mescalero Sands,’ which are doubtless of Quaternary age ...” In places, these sands climb up and over the Mescalero Ridge and spread out over portions of the Llano Estacado.

The north dune is an off-road vehicle area. The south dune is a National Natural Landmark.

== See also ==
- Eastern New Mexico
- West Texas
- Pecos River
- Caprock Escarpment
- Llano Estacado

Addendum: The Mescalero Sands National Natural Landmark South Dune are three mobile dunes separated by a vast oak forest known as "Shinnery" composed of shin high "Quercus harvardii". [2] Each of the three dunes are eroding from a Pleistocene lakebed that dates to 13,000 years ago.[5] They are located at the base of the Mescalero Ridge known locally as the "Caprock" on the western side of the Llano Estacado between Tatum and Roswell, New Mexico five miles south of the north sands recreational area. [10] Past studies have shown the dunes are moving up to ten feet a year to the northeast as a result of the prevailing southwesterly winds. Surface water is known to have been observed in the west or center dune as a seep spring and the windmills in the immediate vicinity were collecting water at a depth of thirty-five feet before the Ogallala Aquifer began to decline. [9] Human presence dates back to 11,500 years ago with evidence of a Folsom/Midland Period occupation but the heaviest use of the dunes by Indigenous peoples occurred during the Formative Period between 1,150 and 1,500 years ago. [8,13 ] The first permanent resident in region was a buffalo hunter named George Causey who built a waystation at the base of the escarpment to serve the need for commerce between Midland, Texas and Roswell, New Mexico.[14] Another prominent figure it the immediate vicinity was a settler known as "Old Man" Harry Robinson who was buried next to his rock house east of the dune field in 1911.[9] One of the earliest families to settle near the dunes were the Browning's who established a ranching operation south of the dunes in the late 1880's. Clyde Browning became a valuable resource for the historical record within the surrounding local stating, "If it hadn't been for the sandhill white-tailed deer we would have starved out".[11] The deer which were considered a unique sub-species [1,3,4,6,7] became extinct in the mid-20th century. [11] However, the ecology of the biome is still rich and diverse with a breeding population of the Dunes Sagebrush Lizard, "Sceloporus arenicolus" as well as the Lesser Prairie Chicken "Tympanuchus pallidicinctus" which have been placed on the threatened/endangered species list. [12] Over 300 plant, mammal, avian, reptile and amphibian specimens have been collected within the Landmark and are now housed at Eastern New Mexico University in Portales, New Mexico [10]
