= Eastern New Mexico =

- Region
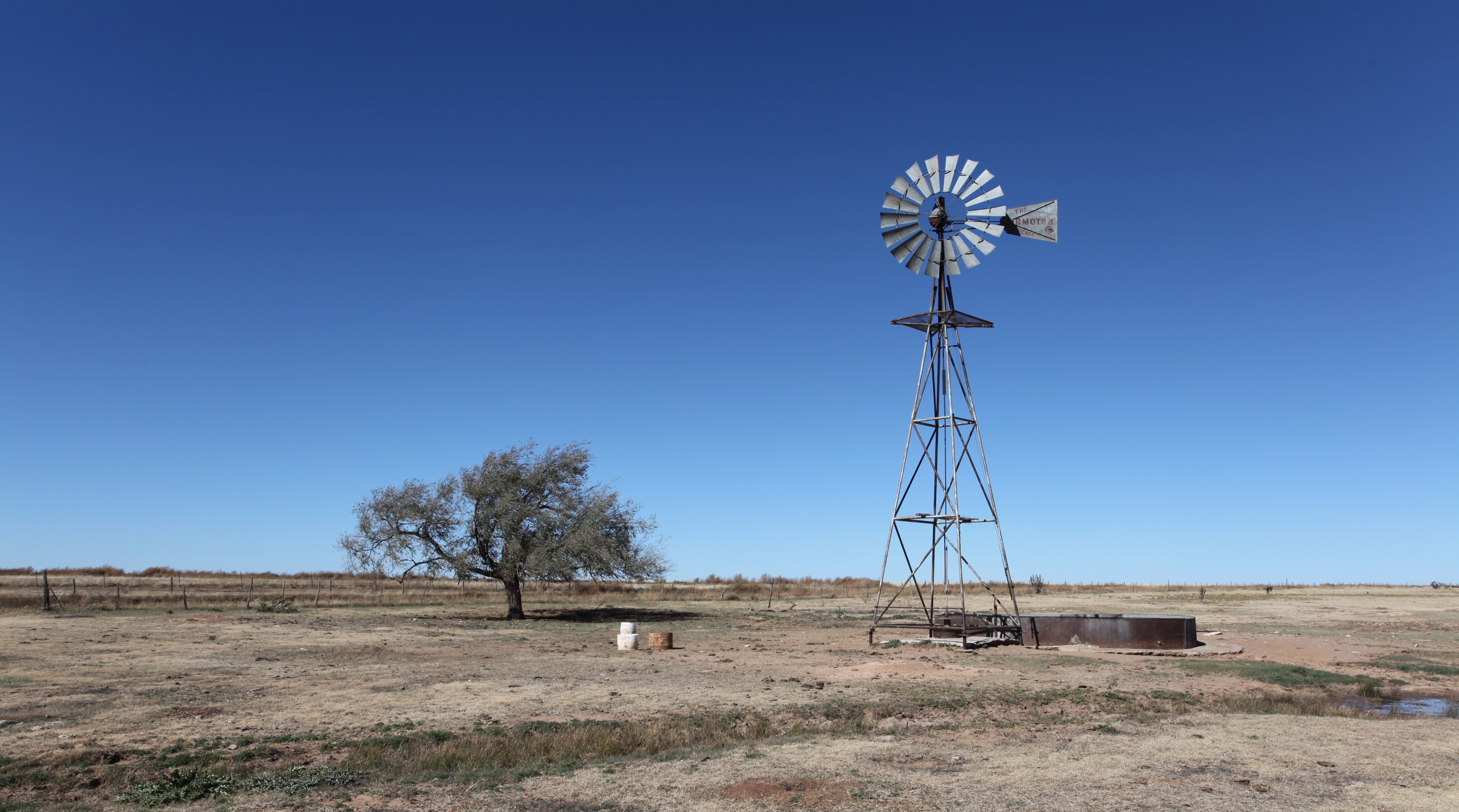
- Windmill north of Bellview, New Mexico

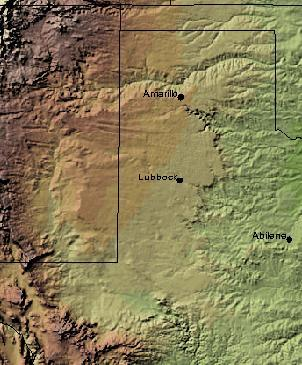
- Shaded relief image of the Llano Estacado including the portion in Eastern New Mexico
- Country: United States
- State: New Mexico
- Region: Llano Estacado

Population (2020)
  - Total: 161,415
- Website: Llano Estacado

Eastern New Mexico is a physiographic subregion within the U.S. state of New Mexico. The region is sometimes called the "High Plains", or "Eastern Plains (of New Mexico)", and was historically referred to as part of the "Great American Desert". The region is largely coterminous with the portion of the Llano Estacado in New Mexico. Portions of Eastern New Mexico's elevation extend to over 4,000 ft (1,200 m). The region is characterized by flat, largely featureless terrain with the exception of the Pecos River valley and the abrupt breaks along the Mescalero Ridge and northern caprock escarpments of the Llano Estacado. The region typically lacks the high relief of central and northern New Mexico, such as that in the Sangre de Cristo and Sandia mountain ranges. The climate is semi-arid with hot summers and is characterized by significant wind and dust storms in the springtime.

Like much of the Llano Estacado region, Eastern New Mexico is largely rural and agricultural, and resembles West Texas in geography, economy, and demographics. The population is sparse as compared to the rest of the country. The region includes portions of the counties of Curry, De Baca, Guadalupe, Lea, Quay, and Roosevelt. It is served by Eastern New Mexico University, a state university located in Portales, and the Blackwater Draw archaeological site is located there.

== Cities in Eastern New Mexico ==
The largest cities in Eastern New Mexico are:

City	Population (2020)
Roswell	48,422
Hobbs	40,508
Clovis	38,567
Carlsbad	32,238
Portales	12,137
Tucumcari	5,278

== Gallery ==
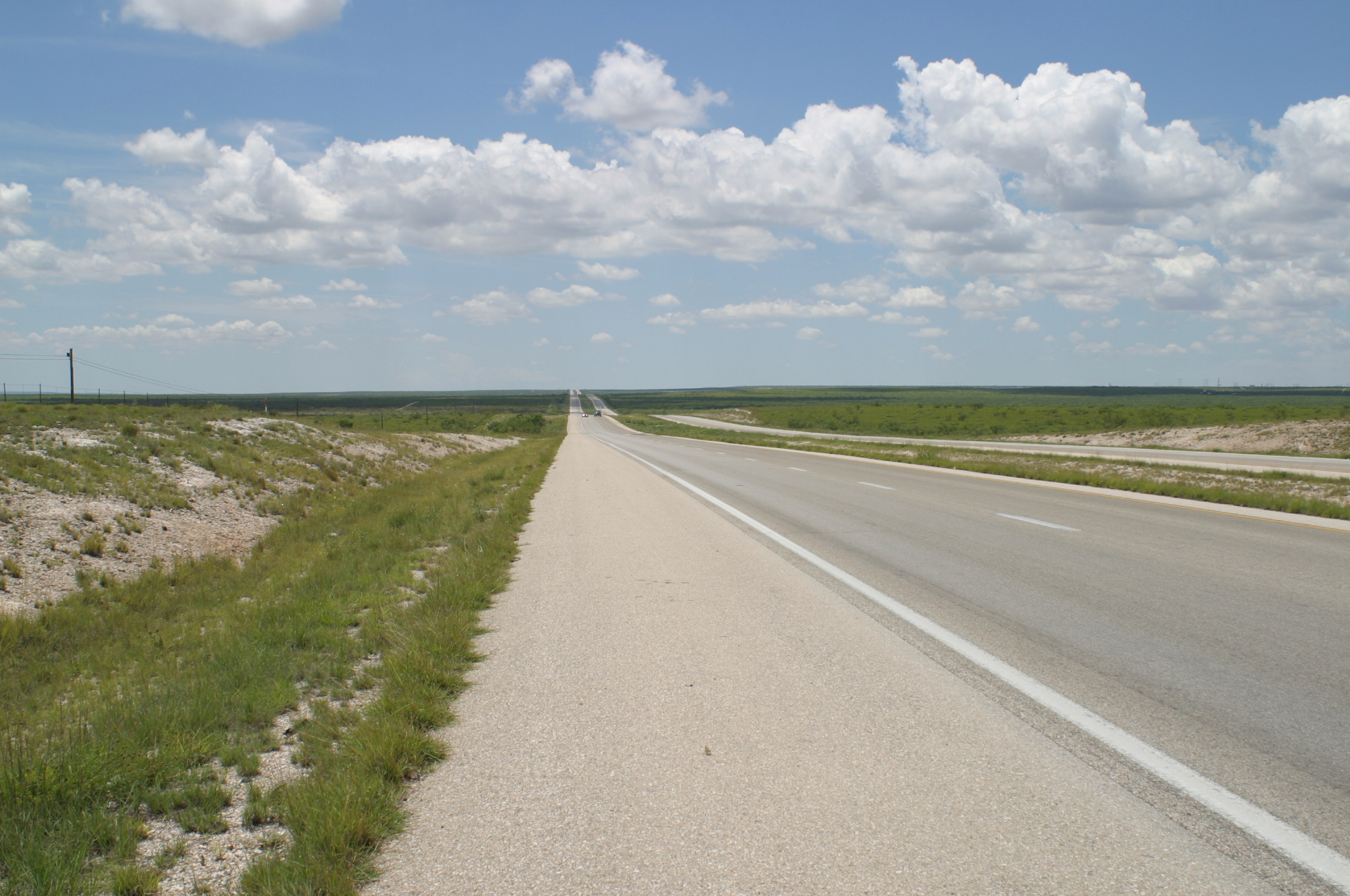
West of Hobbs, Lea County, New Mexico.

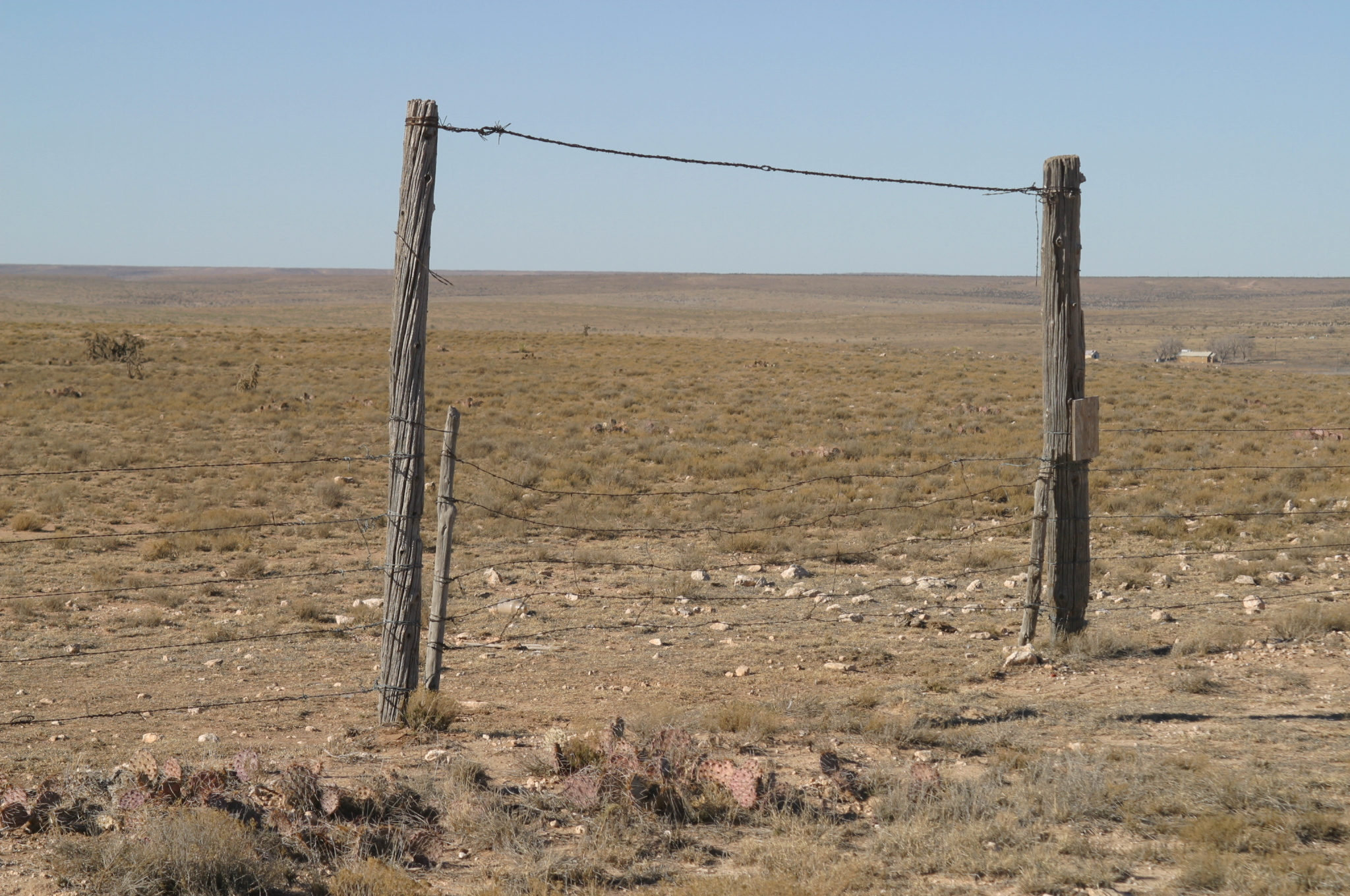
Gate leading to fenced pastureland in the wide open spaces south of Kenna, Roosevelt County, New Mexico.

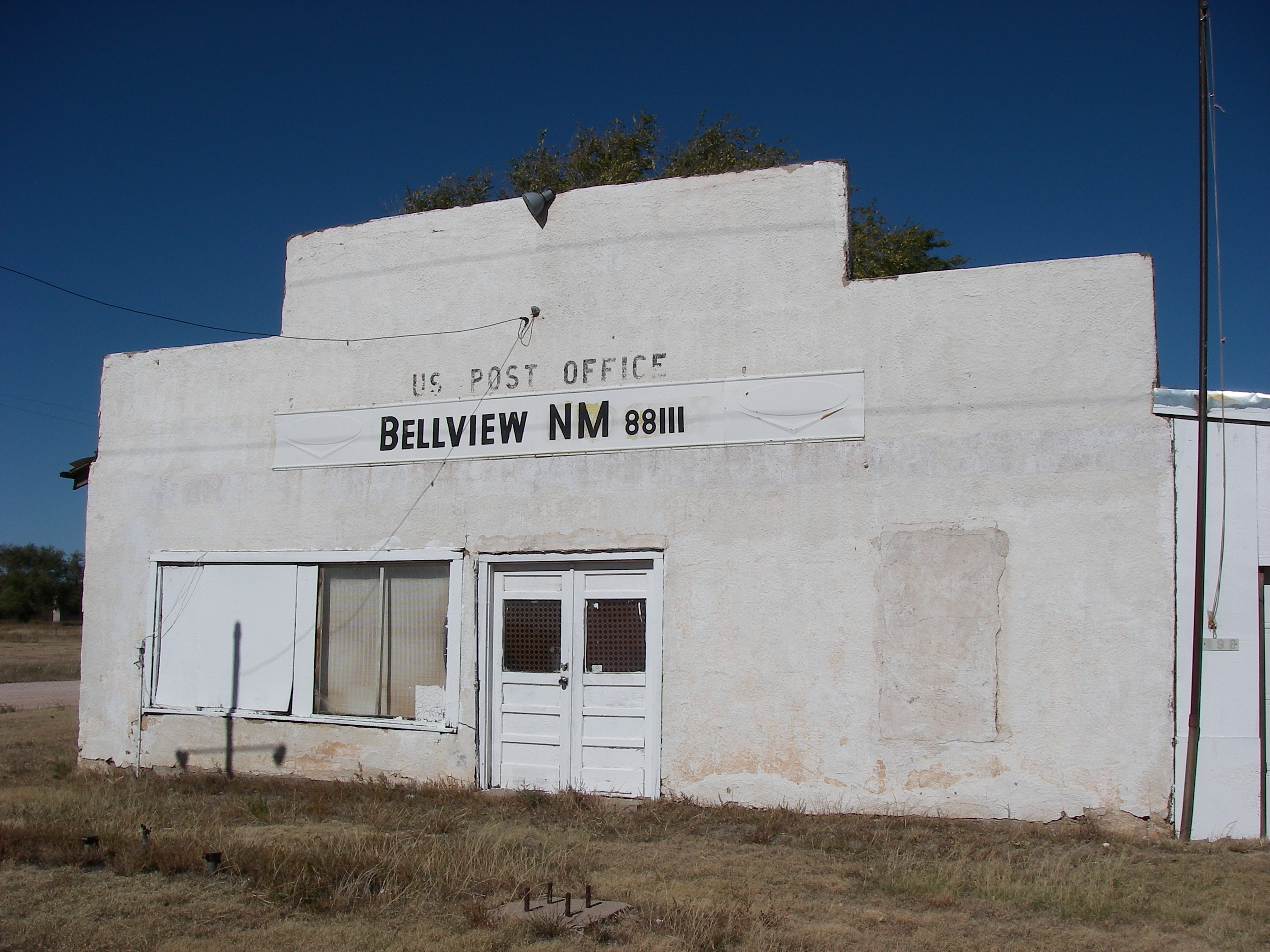
Abandoned post office in Bellview, Curry County, New Mexico.

== See also ==
- Caprock Escarpment
- Llano Estacado
- Lucianosaurus
- Mescalero Ridge
- Pecos River
- West Texas
