= Scale (zoology) =

Small rigid plate that grows out of an animal's skin

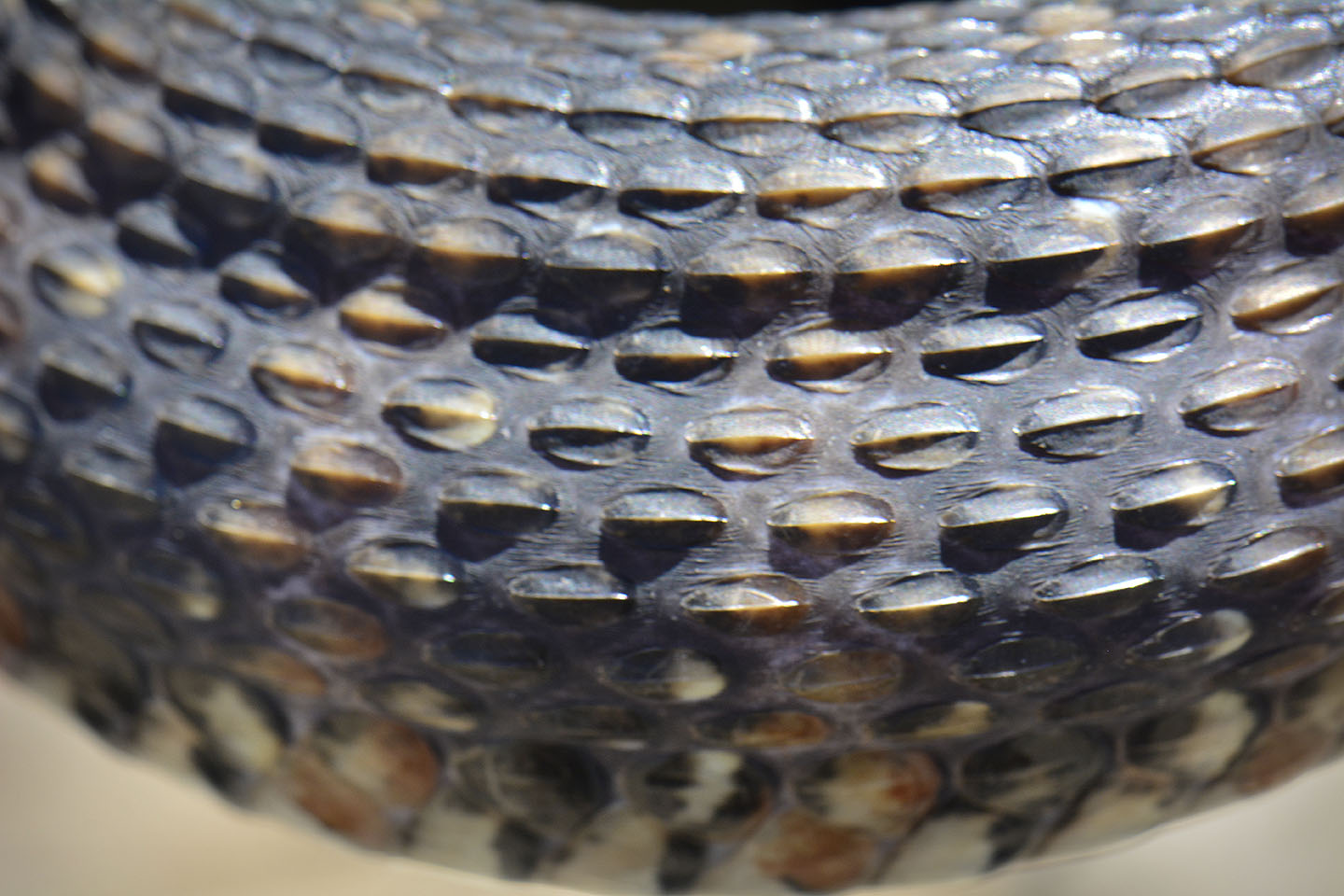
Keeled scales of a colubrid snake (banded water snake; Nerodia fasciata)

In zoology, a scale (Ancient Greek: λεπίς, romanized: lepís; Latin: squāma) is a small rigid plate made out of keratin that grows out of vertebrate animals' skin to provide protection. In lepidopterans (butterflies and moths), scales are plates on the surface of the insect wing, made out of chitin instead of keratin, and provide coloration. Scales are quite common and have evolved multiple times through convergent evolution, with varying structure and function.

Scales are generally classified as part of an organism's integumentary system. There are various types of scales according to the shape and class of an animal.

== Fish scales ==
Fish scales are dermally derived, specifically in the mesoderm. This fact distinguishes them from reptile scales paleontologically. Genetically, the same genes involved in tooth and hair development in mammals are also involved in scale development.

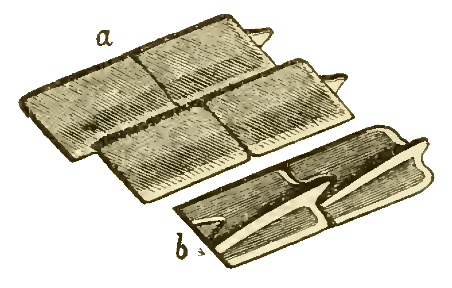
Ganoid scales on a carboniferous fish Amblypterus striatus

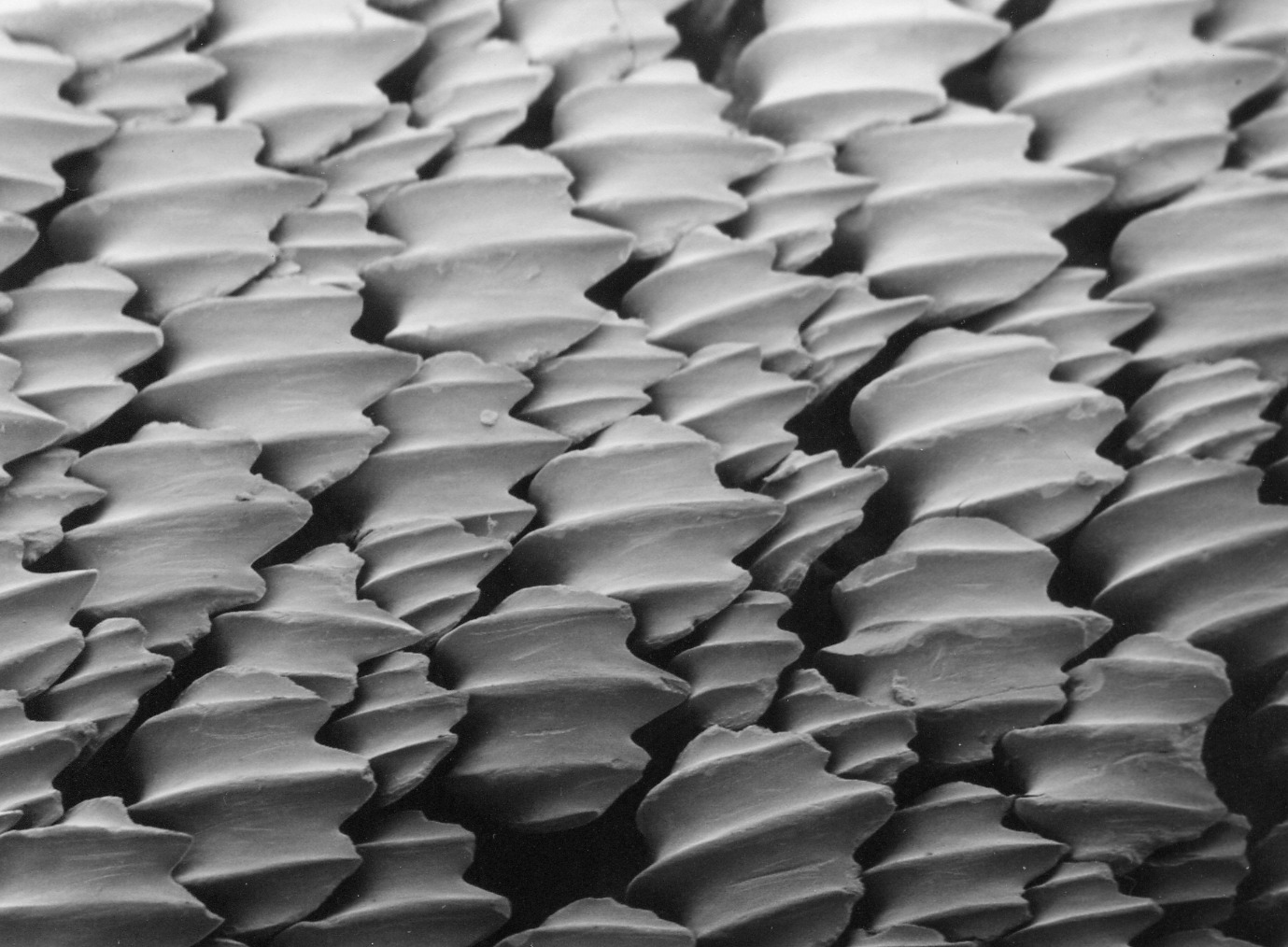
Placoid scales on a lemon shark (Negaprion brevirostris)

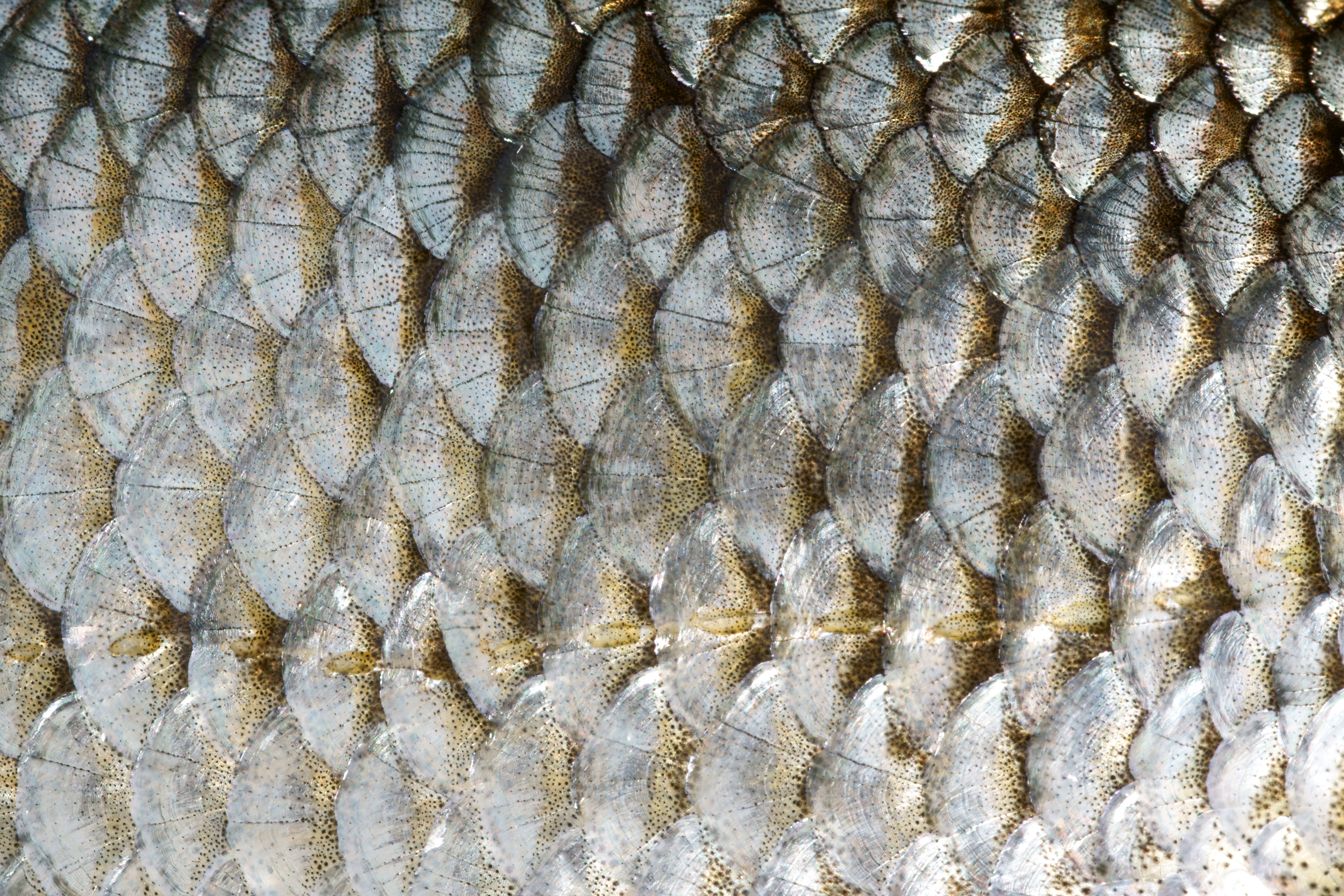
Cycloid scales on a common roach (Rutilus rutilus)

=== Cosmoid scales ===
True cosmoid scales can only be found on the Sarcopterygians. The inner layer of the scale is made of lamellar bone. On top of this lies a layer of spongy or vascular bone and then a layer of dentine-like material called cosmine. The upper surface is keratin. The coelacanth has modified cosmoid scales that lack cosmine and are thinner than true cosmoid scales.

=== Ganoid scales ===
Ganoid scales can be found on gars (family Lepisosteidae), bichirs, and reedfishes (family Polypteridae). Ganoid scales are similar to cosmoid scales, but a layer of ganoin lies over the cosmine layer and under the enamel. Ganoin scales are diamond shaped, shiny, and hard. Within the ganoin are guanine compounds, iridescent derivatives of guanine found in a DNA molecule. The iridescent property of these chemicals provide the ganoin its shine.

=== Placoid scales ===
Placoid scales are found on cartilaginous fish including sharks and stingrays. These scales, also called denticles, are similar in structure to teeth, and have one median spine and two lateral spines. The modern jawed fish ancestors, the jawless ostracoderms and later jawed placoderms, may have had scales with the properties of both placoid and ganoid scales.

=== Leptoid scales ===
Leptoid scales are found on higher-order bony fish. As they grow they add concentric layers. They are arranged so as to overlap in a head-to-tail direction, like roof tiles, allowing a smoother flow of water over the body and therefore reducing drag. They come in two forms:

- Cycloid scales have a smooth outer edge, and are most common on fish with soft fin rays, such as salmon and carp.
- Ctenoid scales have a toothed outer edge, and are usually found on fish with spiny fin rays, such as bass and crappie.

== Reptilian scales ==
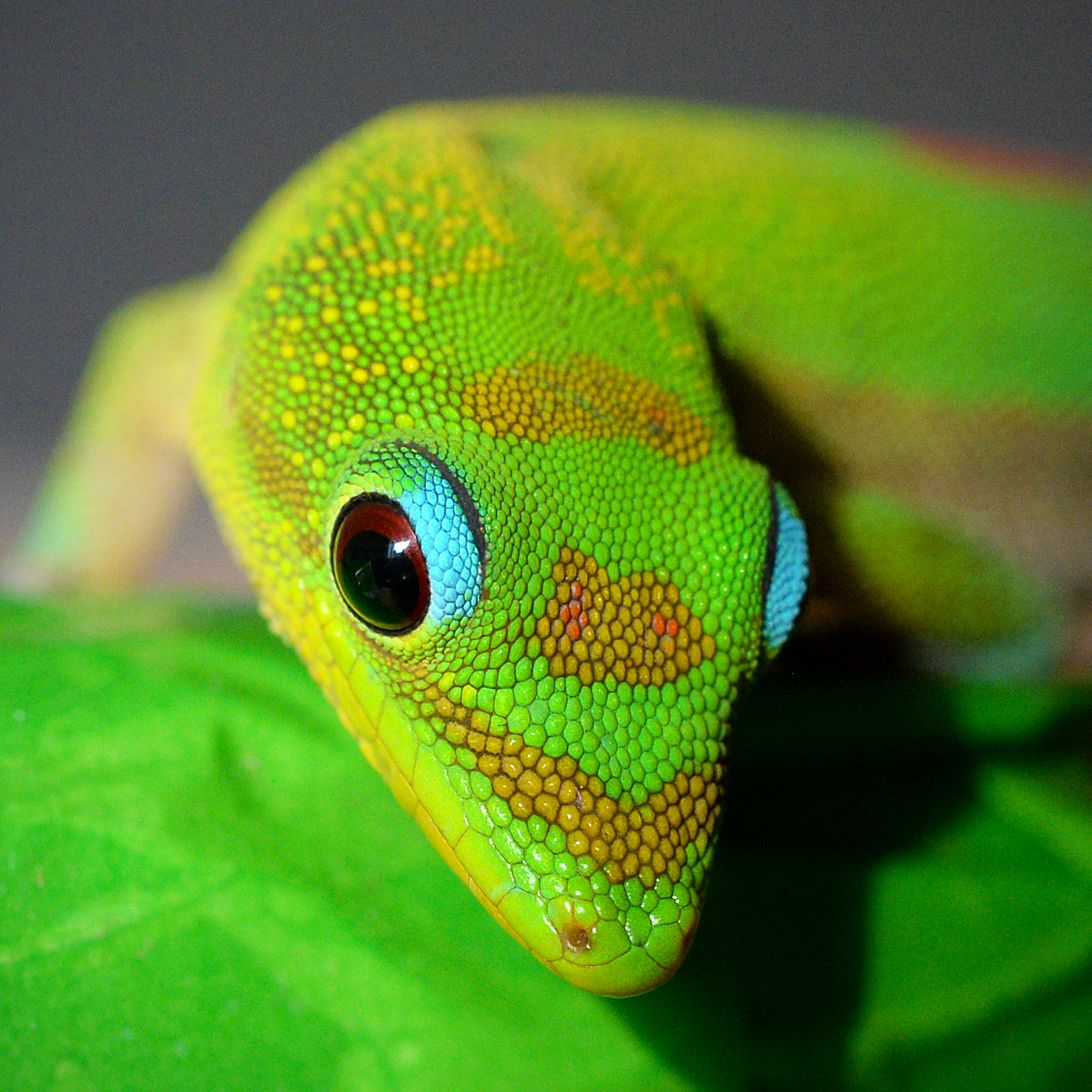
Brightly colored scales on a gold dust day gecko

Reptile scale types include cycloid, granular (which appear bumpy), and keeled (which have a center ridge). Scales usually vary in size, the stouter, larger scales cover parts that are often exposed to physical stress (usually the feet, tail and head), while scales are small around the joints for flexibility. Most snakes have extra broad scales on the belly, each scale covering the belly from side to side.

The scales of all reptiles have an epidermal component (what one sees on the surface), but many reptiles, such as crocodilians and turtles, have osteoderms underlying the epidermal scale. Such scales are more properly termed scutes. Snakes, tuataras and many lizards lack osteoderms. All reptilian scales have a dermal papilla underlying the epidermal part, and it is there that the osteoderms, if present, would be formed.

Many reptiles possess large scales not supported by osteoderms known as feature scales. The green iguana possesses large feature scales on the ventral sides of its neck, and dorsal spines not supported by osteoderms. Many extinct non-avian dinosaurs such as Carnotaurus and Brachylophosaurus are known to possess feature scales from skin impressions.

== Avian scales ==
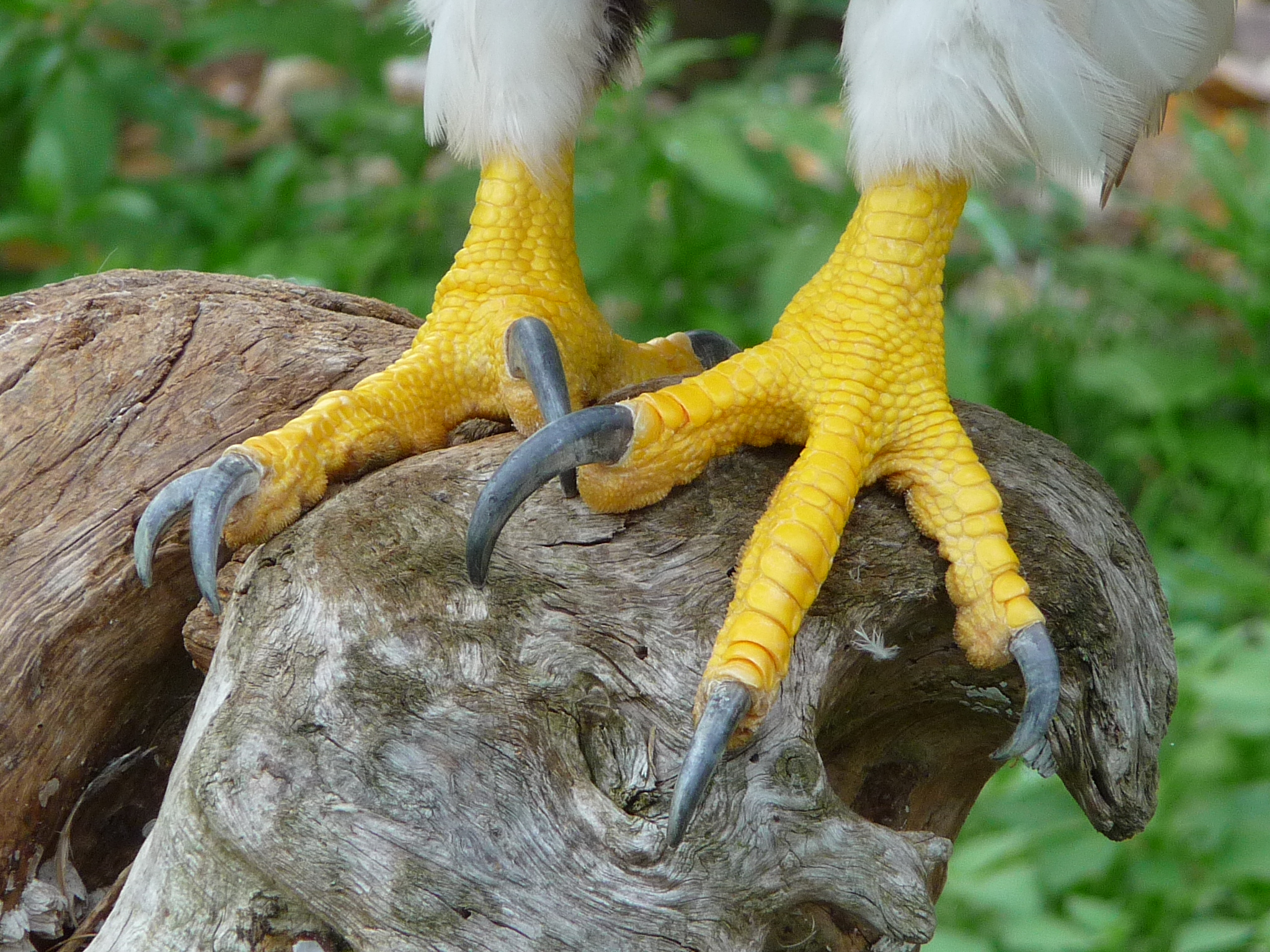
Scales on talons of a Steller's sea eagle (Haliaeetus pelagicus)

Birds' scales are found mainly on the toes and metatarsus, but may be found further up on the ankle in some birds. The scales and scutes of birds were thought to be homologous to those of reptiles, but are now agreed to have evolved independently, being degenerate feathers.

Carcharodontosaurid theropod dinosaur Concavenator, is known to have possessed these feather-derived tarsal scutes.

== Mammalian scales ==
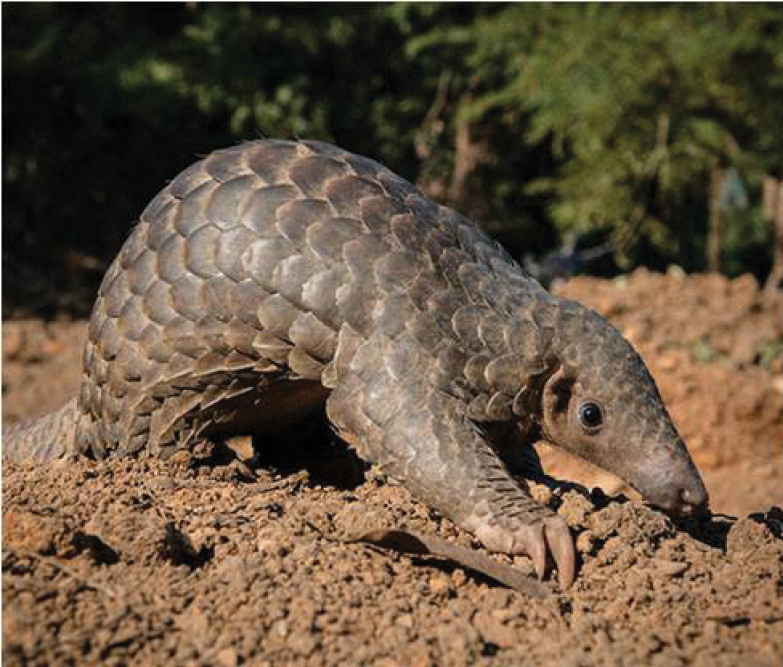
Scale-covered Indian pangolin

An example of a scaled mammal is the pangolin. Its scales are made of keratin and are used for protection, similar to an armadillo's armor. They have been convergently evolved, being unrelated to mammals' distant reptile-like ancestors (since therapsids lost scales), except that they use a similar gene.

On the other hand, the musky rat-kangaroo has scales on its feet and tail. The precise nature of its purported scales has not been studied in detail, but they appear to be structurally different from pangolin scales.

Anomalures also have scales on their tail undersides.

Foot pad epidermal tissues in most mammal species have been compared to the scales of other vertebrates. They are likely derived from cornification processes or stunted fur much like avian reticulae are derived from stunted feathers.

== Arthropod scales ==
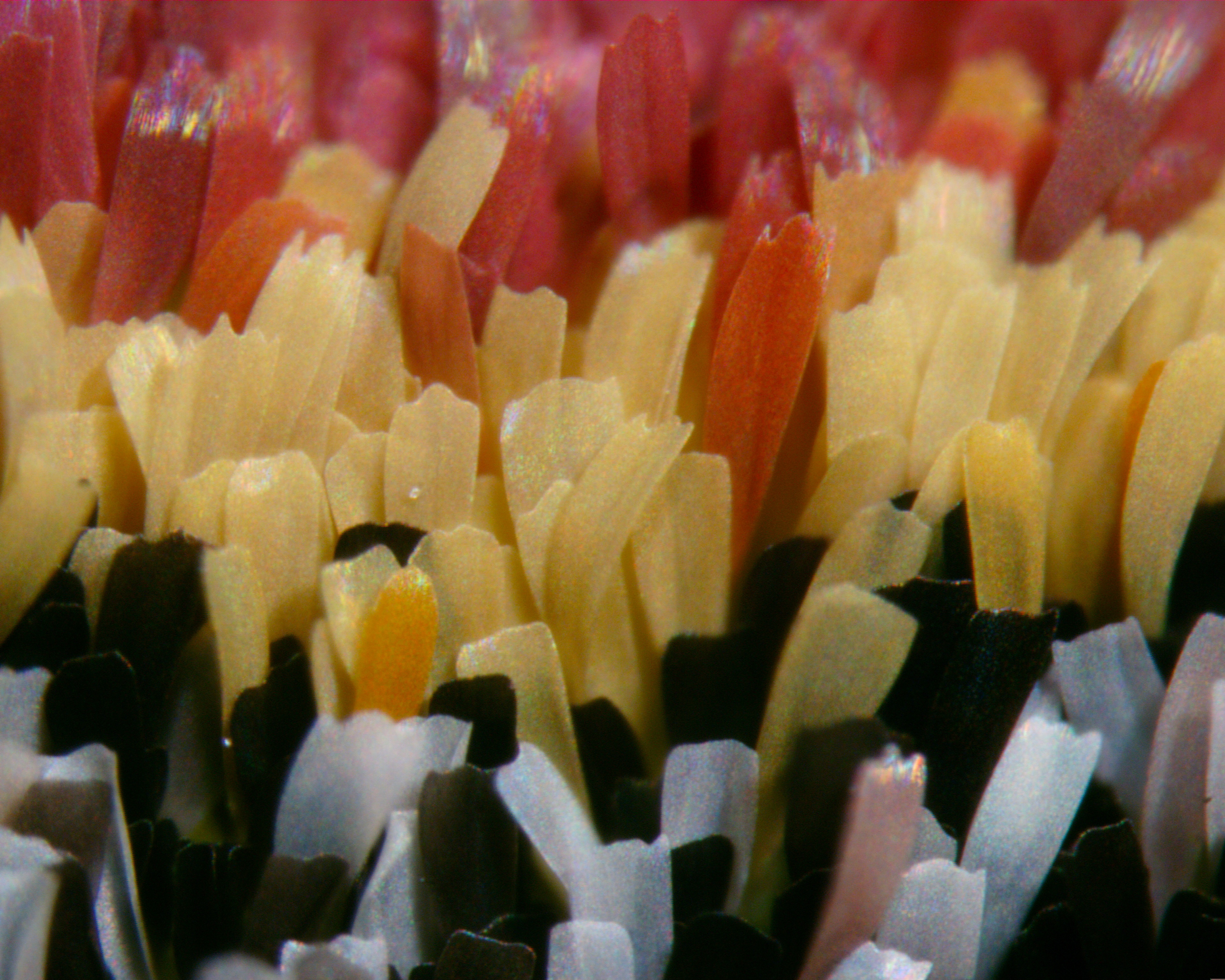
Scales on a luna moth (Actias luna)

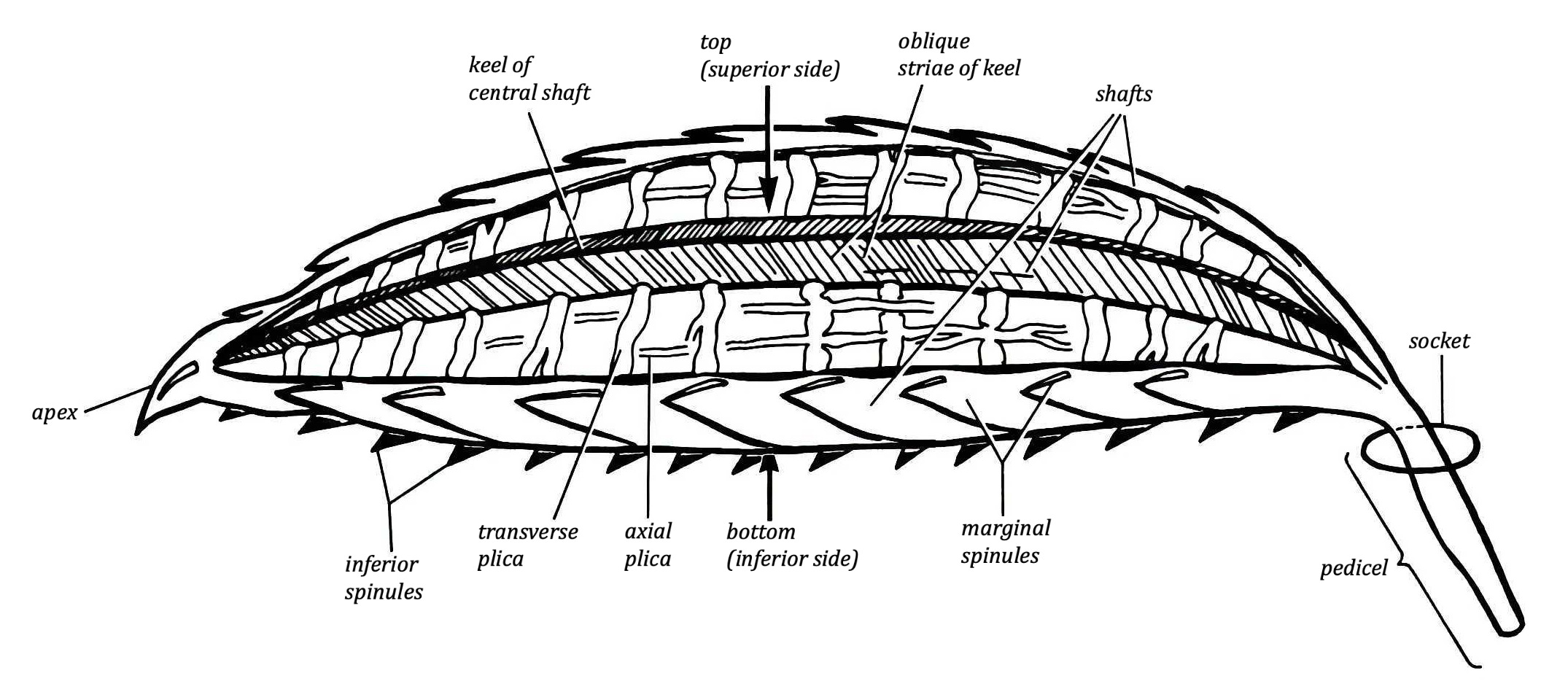
Generalized structure of a keeled, lanceolate scale from a jumping spider

Butterflies and moths - the order Lepidoptera (Greek "scale-winged") - have membranous wings covered in delicate, powdery scales, which are modified setae. Each scale consists of a series of tiny stacked platelets of organic material, and butterflies tend to have the scales broad and flattened, while moths tend to have the scales narrower and more hair like. Scales are usually pigmented, but some types of scales are iridescent, without pigments; because the thickness of the platelets is on the same order as the wavelength of visible light the plates lead to structural coloration and iridescence through the physical phenomenon described as thin-film optics. The most common color produced in this fashion is blue, such as in the Morpho butterflies.

Some types of spiders also have scales. Spider scales are flattened setae that overlay the surface of the cuticle. They come in a wide variety of shapes, sizes, and colors. At least 13 different spider families are known to possess cuticular scales, although they have only been well described for jumping spiders (Salticidae) and lynx spiders (Oxyopidae).

Some crustaceans such as Glyptonotus antarcticus have knobbly scales. Some crayfish have been shown to use antennal scales that are activated in rapid response movements.

== See also ==
- Armour (zoology)
- Psoriasis: a long-lasting autoimmune disease characterized by patches of thin pieces of hard skin like scale.
