= Lucianosaurus =

Lucianosaurus Temporal range: Late Triassic, 228–208.5 Ma

Scientific classification
- Kingdom: Animalia
- Phylum: Chordata
- Clade: Reptiliomorpha
- Clade: Amniota
- Genus: †Lucianosaurus; Hunt & Lucas, 1994

Type species
- †Lucianosaurus wildi Hunt & Lucas, 1994

Extinct genus of reptiles

Lucianosaurus is an extinct genus of amniote of unknown affinities, known only from teeth. Initially described as a basal ornithischian dinosaur, subsequently reclassified as a member of the clade Archosauriformes of uncertain phylogenetic placement and later, taking into account the similarity of its teeth to the teeth of traversodontid cynodonts such as Dadadon (shared presence of teeth with sub-triangular crowns, enlarged denticles, and thecodont tooth implantation), as an amniote of uncertain affinities (though based on dissimilarities in gross morphology and geographic separation it is still more likely that the taxon is indeed an archosauriform rather than a traversodontid).

Fossil remains of Lucianosaurus were first found in the Late Triassic Dockum Group of Eastern New Mexico, United States. The generic name refers to Luciano Mesa (34.980121°N 104.150048°W) in Guadalupe and Quay counties of New Mexico where the teeth of Lucianosaurus were first uncovered and identified.
