= Feature scales =

Enlarged individual scales on an animal

Feature scales are enlarged scales found on various reptiles. Despite their close resemblance to osteoderms, they have no boney component to them. Examples of reptiles that are known to possess feature scales are iguanas, and many non-avian dinosaurs such as Carnotaurus, Brachylophosaurus, diplodocids, and various ceratopsians. The term was coined by Australian paleontologist Phil R. Bell in 2012 in reference to the midline scutes of the hadrosaurid Saurolophus.

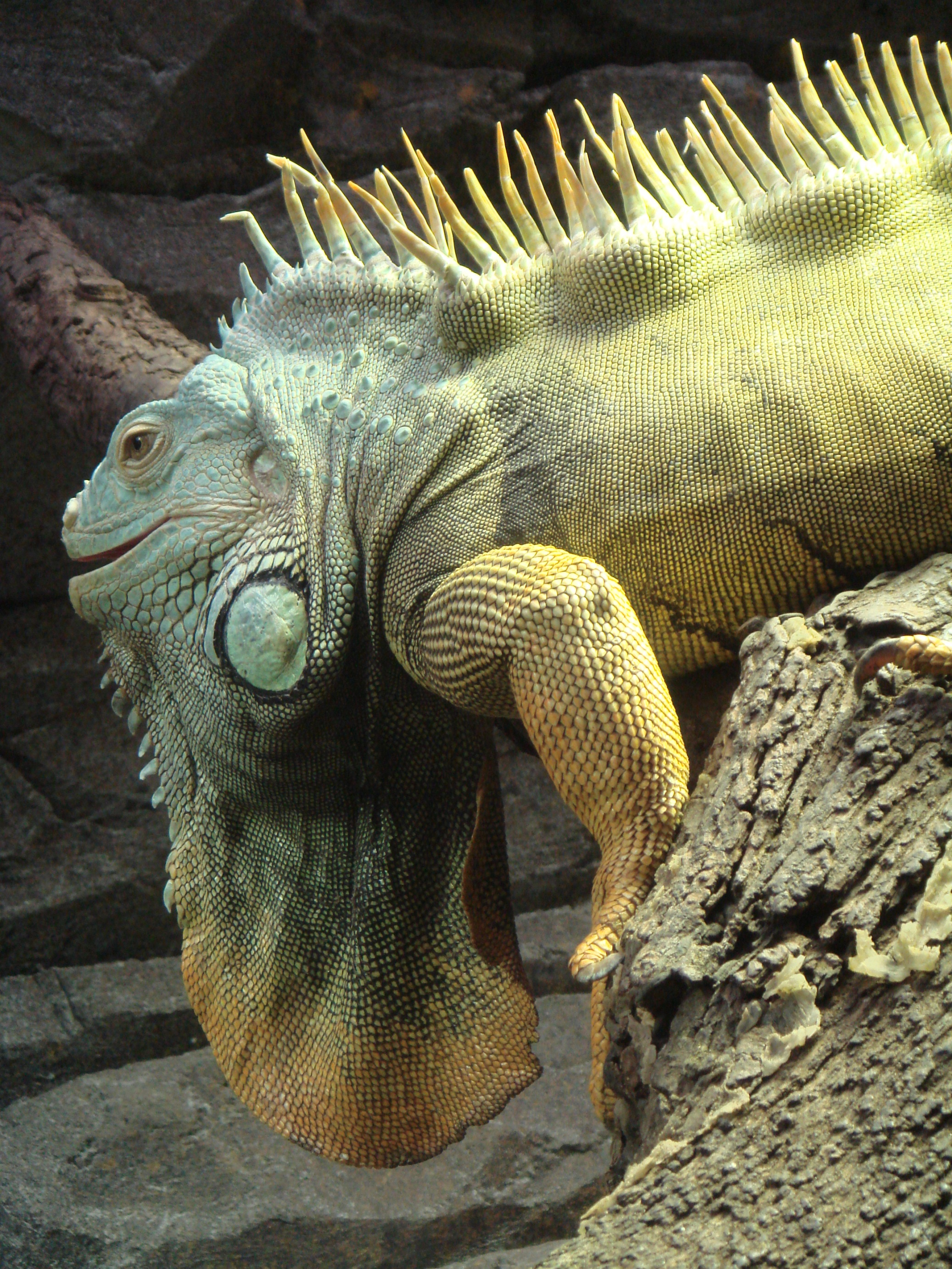
The feature scales on the green iguana form bumps on the lateral sides of the neck, and dorsal spines along the midline. Large feature scales (subtympanic plates) are also present just below the jaw.

Feature scales are distinguished from basement scales (typical, small scales that make up most of the overall scales), by their notable size difference, being significantly wider and taller.

== See also ==
- Scale (zoology)
- Osteoderm
- Reptile scales
- Scute
