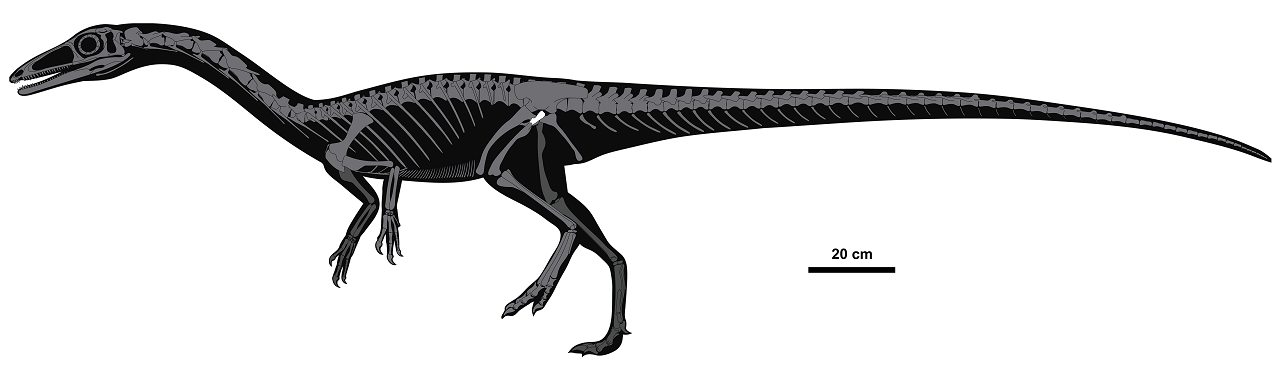
- Skeletal reconstruction of Erythrovenator jacuiensis. Known element in white and unknown in gray.

Scientific classification
- Kingdom: Animalia
- Phylum: Chordata
- Class: Reptilia
- Clade: Dinosauria
- Clade: Saurischia
- Clade: Theropoda
- Genus: †Erythrovenator; Müller, 2021

Type species
- †Erythrovenator jacuiensis Müller, 2021

= Erythrovenator =

Erythrovenator Temporal range: Late Triassic, late Carnian - early Norian, ~233-225 Ma

Genus of basal theropod dinosaurs

Erythrovenator is a genus of basal theropod dinosaurs from the Late Triassic of Rio Grande do Sul, Brazil. The genus contains a single species, Erythrovenator jacuiensis.

== Discovery ==
The holotype and only known specimen of Erythrovenator, CAPPA/UFSM 0157, is an isolated proximal portion of the left femur. This fossil was found in red mudstone of the Niemeyer Site, near Agudo in Rio Grande Sul. The site is tentatively considered to be early Norian (or possible late Carnian) in age and belongs the Candelária Sequence of the Santa Maria Supersequence. No other dinosauromorphs are known from this site, which is dominated by the traversodontid cynodont Siriusgnathus. The site probably corresponds to the Riograndia Assemblage Zone based on the presence of Siriusgnathus.

The generic name, Erythrovenator, is derived from the Greek word ερυθρός (erythrós), meaning "red" (in reference to the color of the holotype), and the Latin word vēnātor, meaning "hunter." The specific name, jacuiensis, references a nearby river, the Jacuí River.

== Description ==
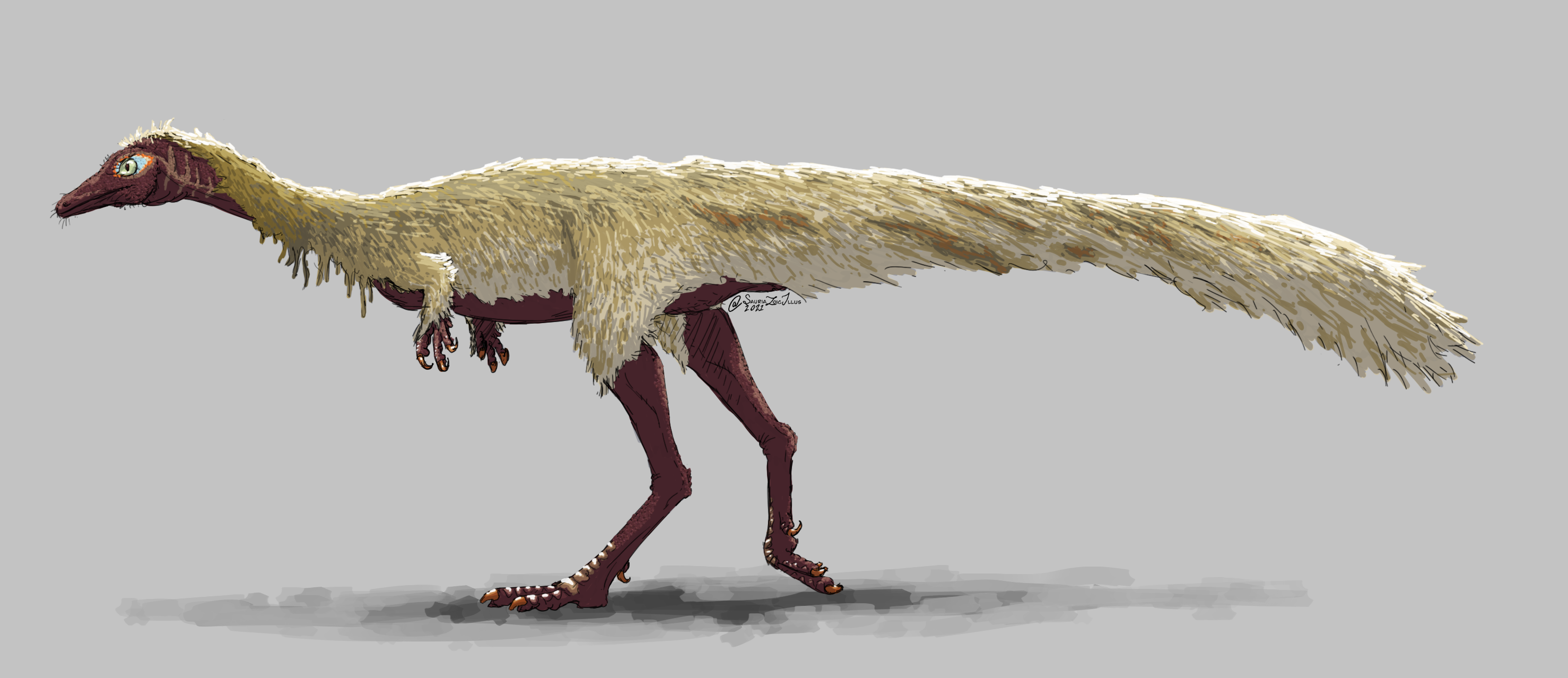
Artistic reconstruction of Erythrovenator as a basal theropod

Although only partially preserved, the femur has an estimated total length of about 190 millimeters (7.5 inches). The femoral head has a strongly concave lower edge, a rounded inner edge, and a distinct anterolateral tuber, all characteristics of dinosaur femora. It also had small anteromedial and posteromedial tubers, with the former structure quite different from the folded anteromedial tuber of other theropods. The rear surface of the femoral head has a thin vertical ridge in its medial portion and a raised scar in its lateral portion, similar to Buriolestes. There is no evidence for a dorsolateral trochanter, unlike all other known Triassic dinosaurs. On the other hand, the anterior trochanter is a prominent pyramidal structure offset from the shaft by a cleft. This is most similar to neotheropods among early dinosaurs, and is also observed in some silesaurids. Although there is no distinct trochanteric shelf, the anterior trochanter does have a plate-like medial extension.

== Classification ==
A phylogenetic analysis placed Erythrovenator as the most basal theropod, supported by the structure of the anterior trochanter. This would make it one of the oldest verifiable theropods known and one of the few known from the Triassic of Brazil. Other potentially older theropods include Eodromaeus (from Argentina), potentially Nhandumirim (also from Brazil), and herrerasaurids, but these taxa are not universally considered theropods. Nhandumirim is now considered to be a basal sauropodomorph. Lepidus and Camposaurus, a pair of coelophysids from the United States of America, are the only other agreed-upon theropods which may have a similar age to Erythrovenator.

- Saurischia
  - Herrerasauridae
  - - Daemonosaurus
    - - - Chindesaurus
        - Tawa hallae
      - - - Eodromaeus
          - Saltopus
        - - Sauropodomorpha
          - Theropoda
            - Erythrovenator
            - Neotheropoda
