= 2015 New Mexico flash floods =

There were two notable flash floods that occurred in New Mexico in 2015, along with several minor flash floods and flash flood warnings. The two notable floods are the following:

- 2015 Philmont Scout Ranch flash flood, on June 27
- 2015 Ghost Ranch flash flood, on July 7
