= Ptychotherates =

Ptychotherates Temporal range: Late Triassic, latest Norian or Rhaetian
- Reconstructed skull

Scientific classification
- Kingdom: Animalia
- Phylum: Chordata
- Class: Reptilia
- Clade: Dinosauria
- Clade: Saurischia
- Clade: †Herrerasauria
- Clade: †Morphoraptora
- Genus: †Ptychotherates; Srivastava & Nesbitt, 2026
- Species: †P. bucculentus

Binomial name
- †Ptychotherates bucculentus Srivastava & Nesbitt, 2026

Genus of saurischian dinosaur

Ptychotherates (lit. 'fold hunter') is an extinct genus of saurischian dinosaur known from the Late Triassic (Norian or Rhaetian ages) Chinle Formation of Ghost Ranch, New Mexico, United States. The genus contains a single species, Ptychotherates bucculentus, known from a partial skull. The jugal bone of the skull is unusually tall, deeper than in any other Triassic dinosaur. Ptychotherates is closely related to Chindesaurus, Daemonosaurus, and Tawa, together forming the clade Morphoraptora within Herrerasauria.

== Discovery and naming ==
The Ptychotherates fossil material was discovered in the Coelophysis Quarry at Ghost Ranch, northern New Mexico, United States in 1982. This fossil site, representing outcrops of the Chinle Formation, preserves a mass burial of a coeval Triassic fauna, dominated by fossils of Coelophysis bauri. The specimen is housed in the Carnegie Museum of Natural History in Pittsburgh, Pennsylvania, where it is permanently accessioned as specimen CM 31368. The specimen consists of a nearly complete, albeit somewhat disarticulated, skull.

In 2026, Simba Srivastava and Sterling J. Nesbitt described Ptychotherates bucculentus as a new genus and species of saurischian dinosaur based on these fossil remains, establishing CM 31368 as the holotype specimen. The generic name, Ptychotherates, combines the Greek words ptycho, meaning 'fold' and therates, meaning 'hunter'. This alludes to both the challenge of rearticulating the disarticulated holotype skull, as well as the likely carnivorous behavior of the animal. The specific name, bucculentus, is a Latin word meaning 'with full cheeks', referring to the species' unusually tall jugal.

== Classification ==
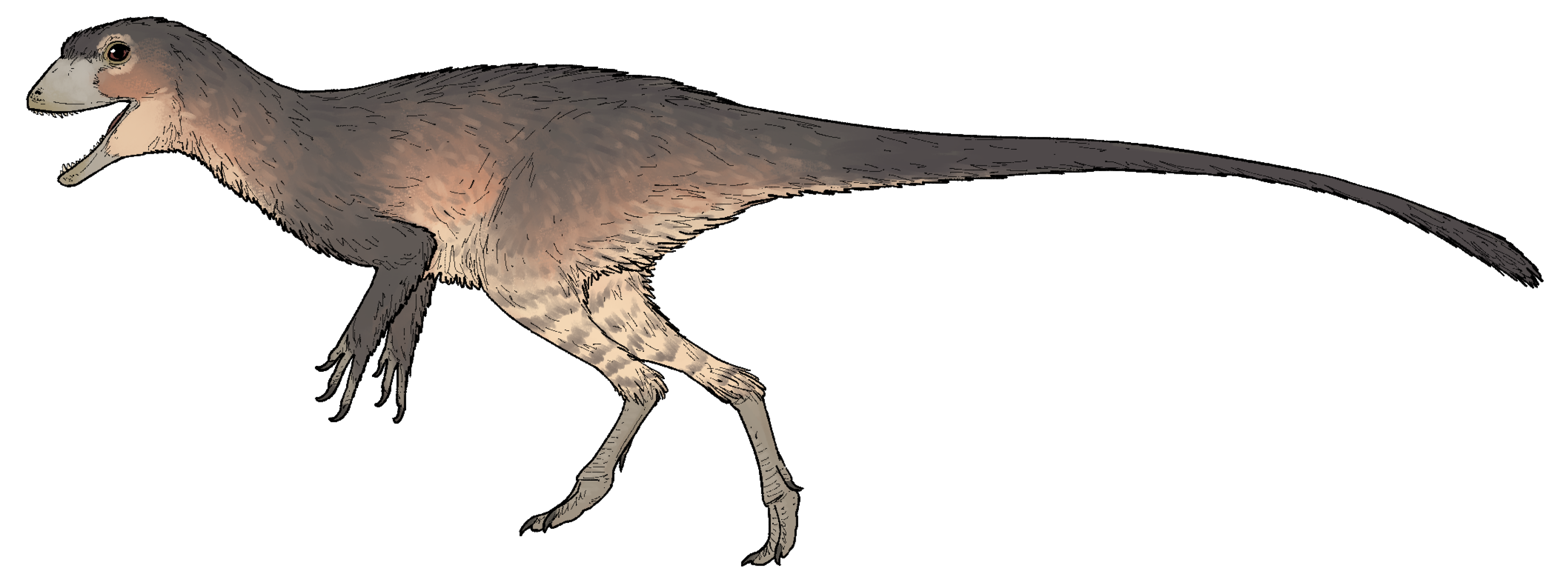
Life restoration

Reconstructed skeleton

To test the affinities and relationships of Ptychotherates, Srivastava and Nesbitt (2026) included it in updated versions of two independent phylogenetic matrices: those of Ezcurra et al. (2023) and Griffin et al. (2022). Both recovered Ptychotherates within the Herrerasauria, in a clade alongside Chindesaurus, Daemonosaurus, and Tawa. Srivastava & Nesbitt named this clade Morphoraptora (lit. 'form robber', or, more loosely, 'bodysnatcher'), referencing the similarity of these animals to the Theropoda, despite not being a part of it. The results using the dataset of Ezcurra et al. (2023) are shown in the cladogram below:

- Dinosauriformes
  - Silesauridae
  - Dinosauria
    - Ornithischia
    - Saurischia
      - Herrerasauria
        - Herrerasauridae
          - Staurikosaurus pricei
          - - Gnathovorax cabreirai
            - Herrerasaurus ischigualastensis
        - Morphoraptora
          - Chindesaurus bryansmalli
          - Daemonosaurus chauliodus
          - Ptychotherates bucculentus
          - Tawa hallae
      - Eusaurischia
        - Theropoda
        - Sauropoda
