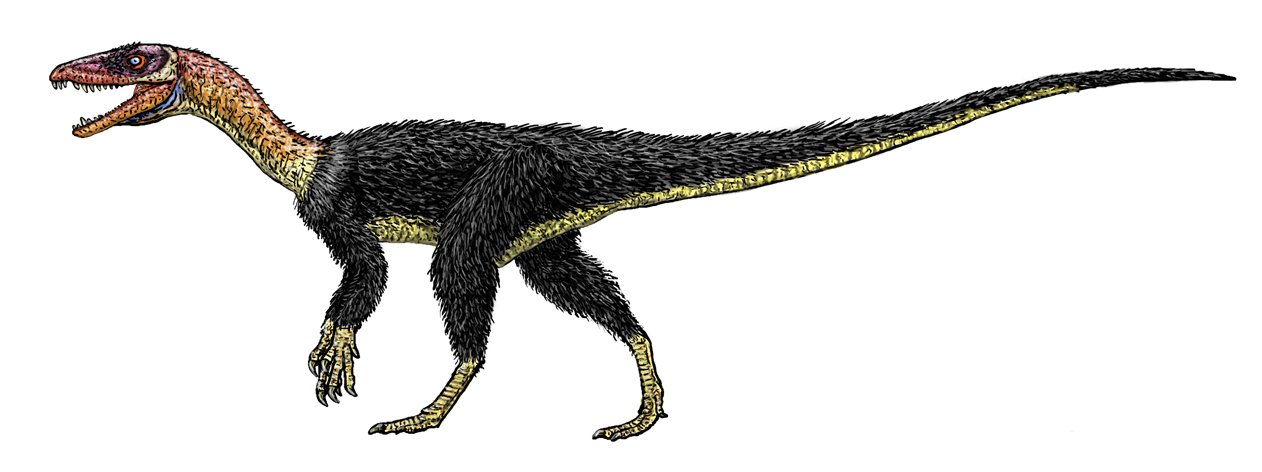
- Life restoration of Tawa hallae

Scientific classification
- Kingdom: Animalia
- Phylum: Chordata
- Class: Reptilia
- Clade: Dinosauria
- Clade: Saurischia
- Clade: †Herrerasauria
- Clade: †Morphoraptora; Srivastava & Nesbitt, 2026

Genera
- †Chindesaurus; †Daemonosaurus; †Ptychotherates; †Tawa

= Morphoraptora =

Morphoraptora Temporal range: Late Triassic, 215–201.4 Ma

Extinct clade of basal saurischian dinosaurs

Morphoraptora is a group of saurischian dinosaurs known from the Late Triassic of the southwestern United States of America. All taxa have so far been recovered from the Chinle Formation. A group formally named in 2026, morphoraptorans are currently considered to be the sister clade to the family Herrerasauridae; together, they form Herrerasauria. Before naming and describing the genus Ptychotherates in 2026, researchers placed other morphoraptorans (Chindesaurus, Tawa, and Daemonosaurus) in various positions within Saurischia, either as herrerasaurids or early basal theropods.

Diagnostic features that define morphoraptorans include fine serrations on the teeth with pointed apices, the anterior extent of the jugal–quadratojugal joint bifurcation beyond the posterior edge of the dorsal jugal process, hatchet-like shape of the postorbital in dorsal view, and a wide ventral recess of the parabasisphenoid with a centrally located foramen. Overall, members of this clade, along with the herrerasaurids, would have resembled early theropods, with bipedal locomotion and dentition suggesting a faunivorous diet.

== Systematics ==
=== Taxonomic history ===
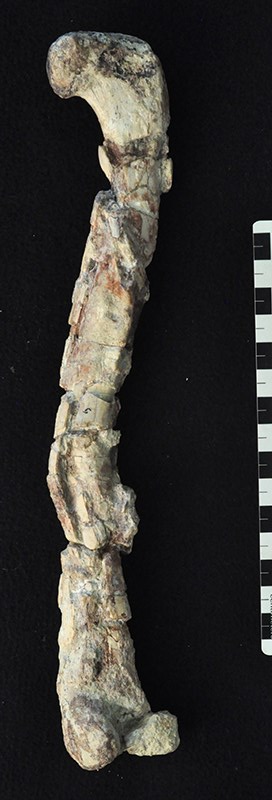
Right femur of the Chindesaurus holotype, seen from behind

The early history of dinosaurs has been contentious, in part because major groupings have radiated and diversified in complex ways. During the Triassic Period, all the major continents were part of a supercontinent known as Pangea. At this point in Earth’s history, dinosaurs were small, bipedal animals that underwent rapid adaptive radiation. This led to confusion over the placement of basal dinosaurs or dinosaur-like archosaurs such as the herrerasaurids and silesaurids.

In 1995, researchers described the first member of this clade, Chindesaurus, based on a holotype found in the Chinle Formation in Petrified Forest National Park in Apache County, Arizona. Researchers recovered several referred specimens from New Mexico's Bull Canyon Formation and Texas's Colorado City Formation. The holotype of Chindesaurus (PEFO 10395) is its most complete specimen, consisting of vertebrae, limb bones, and hip fragments. The genus's classification has been uncertain, as it was initially classified as an early sauropodomorph and later, more commonly, as a herrerasaurid.

Decades later, in 2009, another early saurischian genus, Tawa, was described from several specimens from the Hayden Quarry, New Mexico. This dinosaur was often considered a basal theropod, more derived than the herrerasaurids (including Chindesaurus) and sometimes recovered as a coelophysoid. Still, in 2016, Cabreira et al. found Tawa and Chindesaurus to be a basal clade of saurischians that branched off before the last common ancestor of sauropodomorphs and theropods. A 2019 paper redescribing the Chindesaurus holotype from Marsh et al. found Tawa–Chindesaurus to be a basal clade of theropods, more derived than Herrerasauridae.

Alongside research on the placement of Tawa and Chindesaurus, Daemonosaurus was described in 2011 from material also recovered from the Chinle Formation. While the original describers, Sues et al., initially placed it as a basal theropod between Eoraptor and Tawa, a later study by Nesbitt and Sues (2020) has found alternative taxonomic interpretations, ranging from Daemonosaurus as a basal ornithischian, a basal saurischian, a herrerasaurid, or even a silesaurid. This study was based on the rescoring of datasets from Langer et al. (2017) and Baron et al. (2017), though Nesbitt and Sues felt Daemonosaurus was likely a basal saurischian of some sort. Novas et al. (2021) recovered Tawa in a clade with Daemonosaurus and Chindesaurus that is sister to Herrerasauridae, with this broader Herrerasauria being a saurischian clade sister to Eusaurischia.

In 2026, the publication of Ptychotherates by Srivastava and Nesbitt not only found further support for the clade from Novas et al. (2021) (in which Ptychotherates was recovered to be part of it as well), which they named “Morphoraptora.” The name refers to the clade's strong morphological convergence with theropods, and it is Latin for “bodysnatcher,” referencing the 2007 Radiohead song of the same name. They performed three phylogenetic analyses, including a strict consensus tree using a dataset from Ezcurra et al. (2023). They found Morphoraptora sister to Herrerasauridae and, together, part of Herrerasauria sister to Eusaurischia. Another strict consensus tree the authors constructed using Grifﬁn et al. (2022) found Morphoraptora not monophyletic and its members basal dinosaurs, but when Srivastava and Nesbitt pruned out Guaibasaurus, they recovered Morphoraptora within Herrerasauria again; this time, Herrerasauria is sister to Sauropodomorpha. Other scorings resulted in trees, though less supported, in which Morphoraptora is sister to Eusaurischia, not Herrerasauridae, and even a basal lineage of theropods proper.

=== Evolutionary history and extinction ===
While researchers are still studying their placement within Dinosauria, Herrerasauria were likely a dominant group during the Late Triassic. Herrerasaurians probably originated in the region of Pangea that would become South America during the Carnian. While herrerasaurids evolved and remained there, morphoraptorans have so far been recovered from the Chinle Formation in the southwestern United States of America in the late Norian or Rhaetian. By this point, more derived theropods had appeared as coelophysid genera such as Camposaurus and Coelophysis, which coexisted alongside them. The oldest member is Tawa, with fossils dated to 215 million years ago, while the youngest are Daemonosaurus and Ptychotherates, whose fossils are between 210 and 202 million years old. Because morphoraptorans are absent elsewhere in the fossil record, Srivastava and Nesbitt (2026) suggest they were endemic to low latitudes during the Late Triassic, a sort of refugium for herrerasaurians. Given their age and absence in the Jurassic, morphoraptorans were likely casualties of the Triassic–Jurassic extinction. If future studies continue to find the morphoraptorans as a clade of herrerasaurians, their extinction would represent a major loss in dinosaur diversity.

=== Phylogeny ===
Below is the phylogeny recovered for Morphoraptora by Srivastava and Nesbitt (2026):

- Dinosauriformes
  - Silesauridae
  - Dinosauria
    - Ornithischia
    - Saurischia
      - Herrerasauria
        - Herrerasauridae
          - Staurikosaurus pricei
          - - Gnathovorax cabreirai
            - Herrerasaurus ischigualastensis
        - Morphoraptora
          - Chindesaurus bryansmalli
          - Daemonosaurus chauliodus
          - Ptychotherates bucculentus
          - Tawa hallae
      - Eusaurischia
        - Theropoda
        - Sauropoda

== Anatomy ==
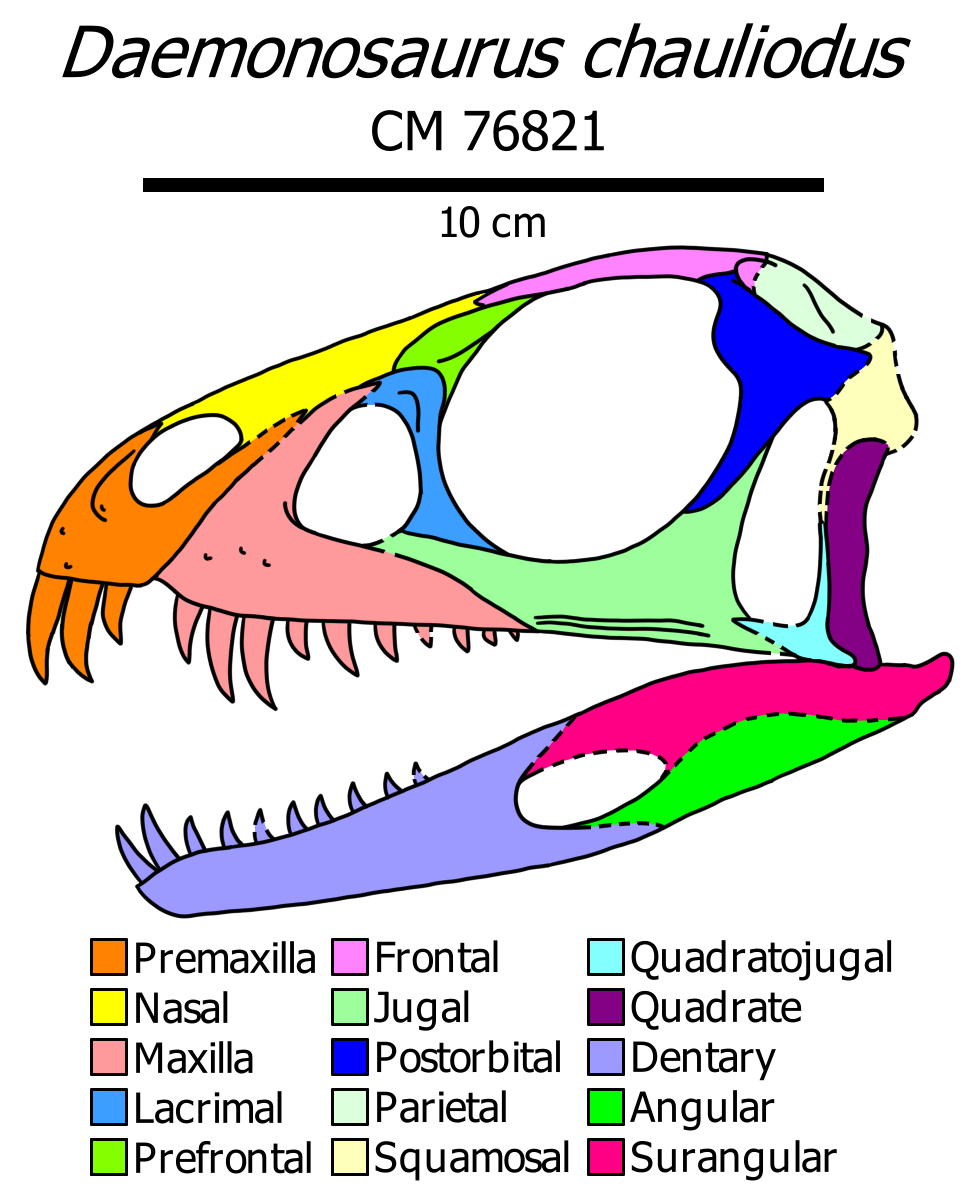
Skull diagram of Daemonosaurus with elongated teeth (according to Nesbitt & Sues, 2020). Note the kink between the premaxilla and maxilla as shared in known skull material of morphoraptorans.

Material recovered from morphoraptorans is overall fragmentary, usually consisting of skull fragments. Chindesaurus preserves postcrania, and Tawa is known from both skull and postcranial fossils, with multiple specimens. Fossils recovered from this group still offer glimpses into their anatomy and how they compare with other dinosaurs, particularly related herrerasaurids and theropods.

=== Cranial remains ===
Cranial remains are known only from Tawa, Daemonosaurus, and Ptychotherates. The premaxillae from Tawa and Daemonosaurus have three teeth (also seen in Gnathovorax) and show a kink between the premaxillae and maxillae, as in the aforementioned genera and Ptychotherates. Tawa differs from Daemonosaurus and Ptychotherates in skull shape. Tawa has a long, slender skull, typical of many early saurischians. Daemonosaurus and Ptychotherates, by contrast, had short, deep, robust skulls with large eye orbits and greatly elongated teeth. Diagnostic features that define morphoraptorans include fine serrations on the teeth with pointed apices, the anterior extent of the jugal–quadratojugal joint bifurcation beyond the posterior edge of the dorsal jugal process, hatchet-like shape of the postorbital in dorsal view, and a wide ventral recess of the parabasisphenoid with a centrally located foramen. Other and more technical details in the skulls of morphoraptorans can also be seen in Herrerasaurus.

=== Postcranial remains ===
Like other early dinosaurs, morphoraptorans were bipedal, though postcranial remains are only known from Tawa and Chindesaurus. In both of these related genera, the tibiae have similar attributes. A posterior margin of the proximal end of the tibia is divided by two notches. This was also supported by the absence of an oblique ligament sulcus on the rear of the femoral head, a low cnemial crest and prominent posterolateral process of the tibia, and a low astragalus with a prominent anterior groove.
