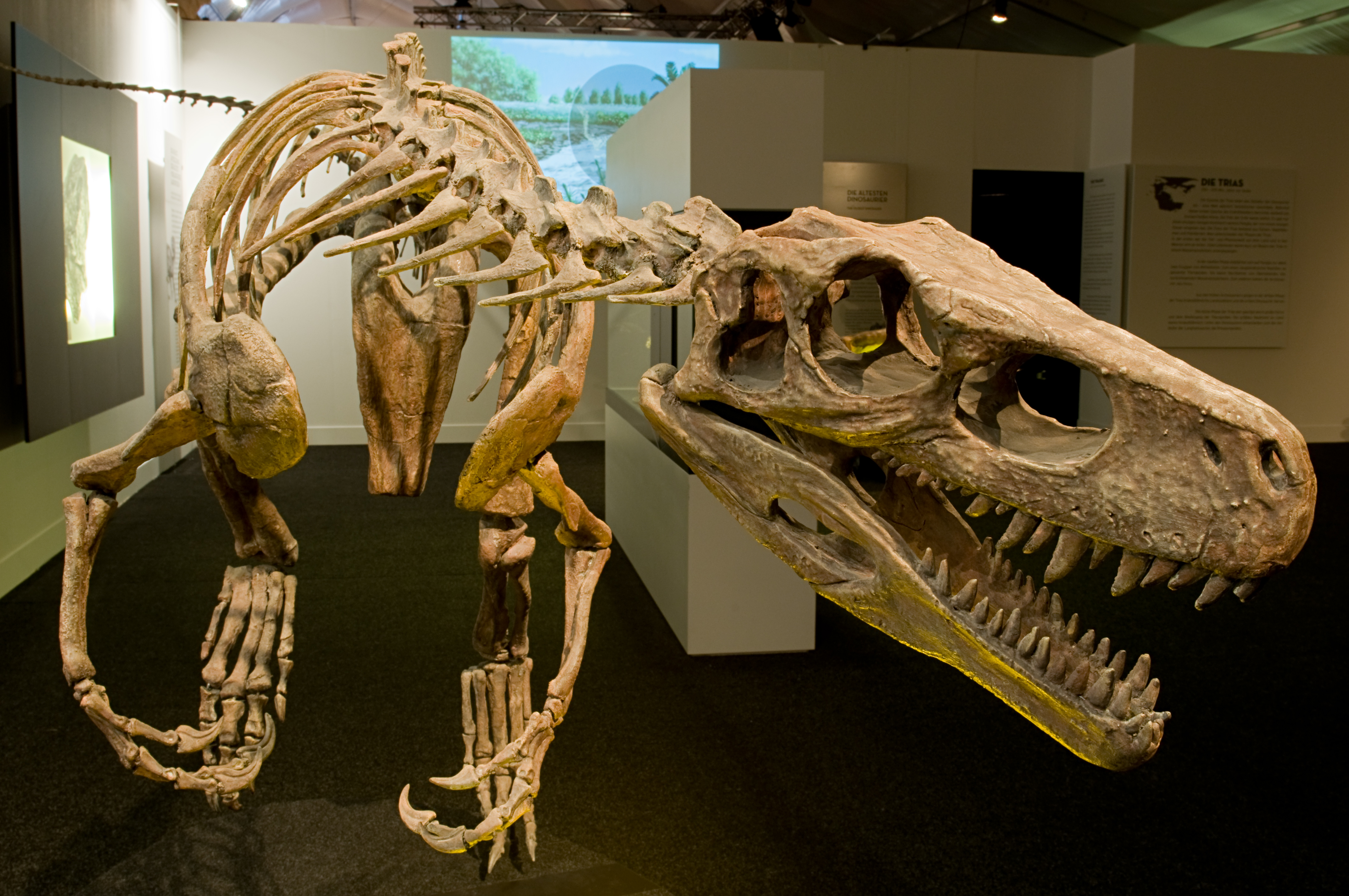
- Skeleton of Herrerasaurus

Scientific classification
- Kingdom: Animalia
- Phylum: Chordata
- Class: Reptilia
- Clade: Dinosauria
- Clade: Saurischia
- Clade: †Herrerasauria; Galton, 1985

Genera
- †Caseosaurus?; †Maleriraptor; †Morphoraptora; †Herrerasauridae Benedetto, 1973; †Gnathovorax; †Herrerasaurus; †Sanjuansaurus; †Staurikosaurus

Synonyms
- Staurikosauridae Galton, 1977; Herreravia Paul, 1988

= Herrerasauria =

Herrerasaurs Temporal range: Late Triassic (Carnian), 233.23–210 Ma Possible Late Rhaetian records due to the uncertainty in age of Daemonosaurus and Ptychotherates.

Extinct family of basal saurischian dinosaurs

Herrerasauria is an extinct clade of carnivorous dinosaurs, possibly basal to either theropods or all saurischians, or even their own branching from Dracohors, separate from Dinosauria altogether. They are among the oldest known dinosaurs, first appearing in the fossil record around 233.23 million years ago (the Carnian stage of the Late Triassic), before becoming extinct by the end of the Carnian stage. Herrerasaurids were relatively small-sized dinosaurs, normally no more than 4 metres (13 ft) long, although the holotype specimen of "Frenguellisaurus ischigualastensis" (nowadays considered a synonym of Herrerasaurus ischigualastensis) is thought to have reached around 6 meters (20 ft) long. The best known representatives of this group are from South America (Brazil, Argentina), where they were first discovered in the 1930s in relation to Staurikosaurus and 1960s in relation to Herrerasaurus. A nearly complete skeleton of Herrerasaurus ischigualastensis was discovered in the Ischigualasto Formation in San Juan, Argentina, in 1988. Less complete possible herrerasaurids have been found in North America and Africa, and they may have inhabited other continents as well.

Herrerasaurid anatomy is unusual and specialized, and they are not considered to be ancestral to any later dinosaur group. They only superficially resemble theropods and often present a mixture of very primitive and derived traits. The acetabulum is only partly open, and there are only two sacral vertebrae, the lowest number among dinosaurs. The pubic bone has a derived structure, being rotated somewhat posteriorly and folded to create a superficially tetanuran-like terminal expansion, especially prominent in H. ischigualastensis. The hand is primitive in having five metacarpals and the third finger longer than the second, but resembles those of theropods in having only three long fingers, with curved claws. Herrerasaurids also have a hinged mandible, which is also found in theropods.

== Classification ==
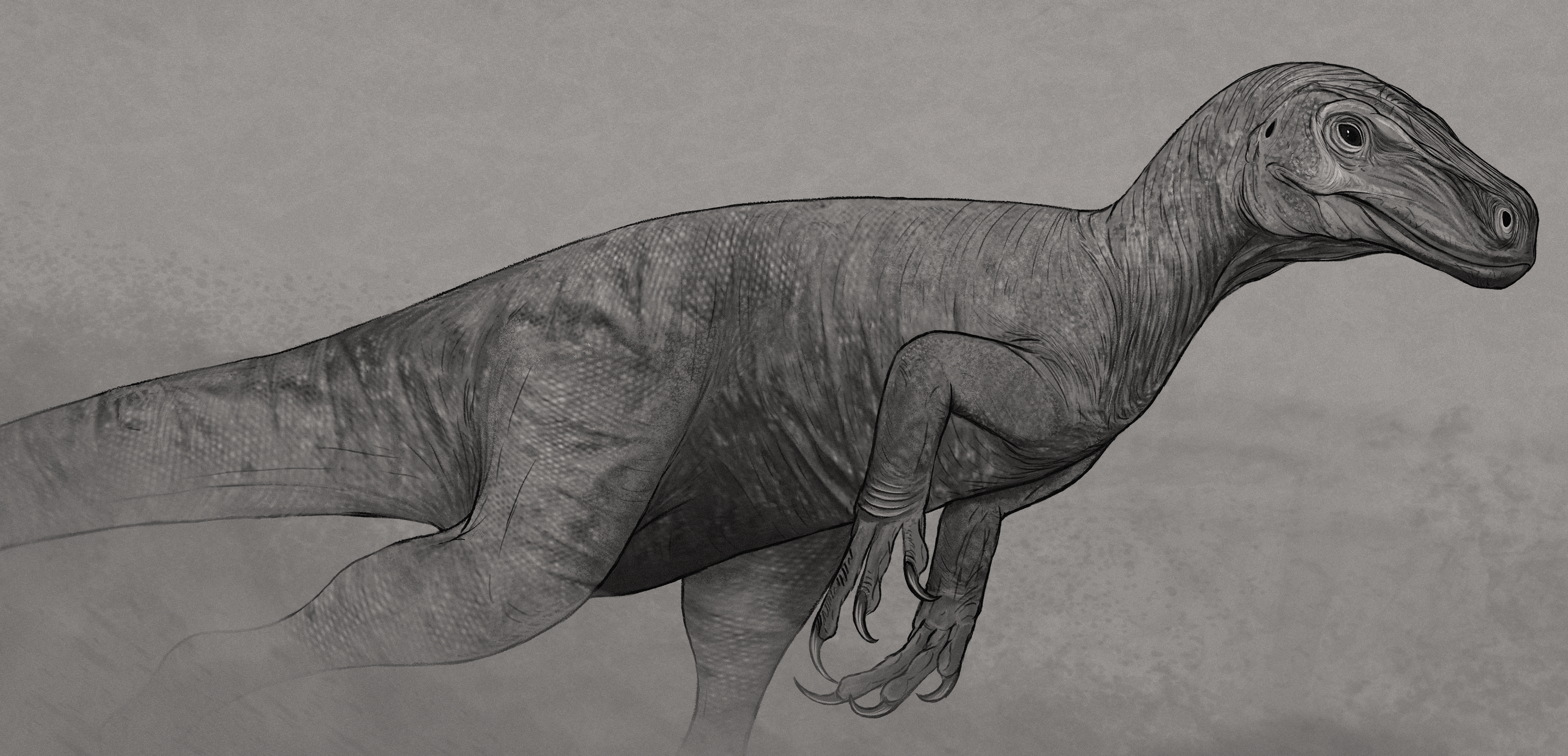
Reconstruction of Staurikosaurus

It is not clear where herrerasaurids lie on the early dinosaur evolutionary tree. They are possibly basal theropods or basal saurischians. Early researchers even proposed that they represented an early lineage of sauropodomorphs. Some analyses, such as Nesbitt et al/ 2009, have found Herrerasaurus and its relatives in Herrerasauridae to be very basal theropods, while others (such as Ezcurra 2010) have found them to be basal to the clade Eusaurischia, that is, closer to the base of the saurischian tree than either theropods or sauropodomorphs, but not true members of either. The situation is further complicated by uncertainties in correlating the ages of late Triassic beds bearing land animals.

Other proposed members of the clade have included Sanjuansaurus from the Ischigualasto Formation of Argentina, Staurikosaurus and Gnathovorax from the Santa Maria Formation of southern Brazil, Chindesaurus from the Petrified Forest (Chinle Formation) of Arizona, and possibly Caseosaurus from the Dockum Formation of Texas, although the relationships of the North American animals are not fully understood, and not all paleontologists agree. Grzegorz Niedźwiedzki, Stephen L. Brusatte et al. (2014) described a European putative member of the group on the basis of Norian age fossils discovered in Poland. An unnamed herrerasaurid was reported from the Carnian Pebbly Arkose Formation in Zimbabwe by Griffin et al. (2022). Other possible basal saurischians include Alwalkeria from the Late Triassic Maleri Formation of southern India, and Teyuwasu (recently considered synonym of Staurikosaurus), known from very fragmentary remains from the Late Triassic of Brazil.

The discovery of the Herrerasaurid Gnathovorax indicates that the family falls outside the Theropoda and Sauropodomorpha in the cladistic analysis undertaken on the genus when it was described, but remains squarely within Saurischia as basal members of the order. An unnamed herrerasaurid from the Carnian of Brazil was described and possibly belongs to a new morphotype of relatively large proportions, informally known as the "Big Saturnalia". In the phylogenetic analysis within this study, herrerasaurids are recovered as non-eusaurischian saurischians.

=== Phylogeny ===
Fernando Novas (1992) defined Herrerasauridae as Herrerasaurus, Staurikosaurus, and their most recent common ancestor. Paul Sereno (1998) defined the group as the most inclusive clade including H. ischigualastensis but not Passer domesticus. Langer (2004) provided first phylogenetic definition of a higher level taxon, Herrerasauria, as Herrerasaurus but not Liliensternus or Plateosaurus. According to current phylogenetic studies, all of these definitions describe the same clade.

The first cladogram presented follows one proposed analysis by Novas et al. in May 2011. In this review, Herrerasaurus is found to be a basal saurischian, but not a theropod. The second cladogram is based on an analysis by Sues et al. in April 2011. This review classified Herrerasaurus as a basal theropod.

- Dinosauria
  - Ornithischia
  - Saurischia
    - Herrerasauridae
      - Staurikosaurus
      - Herrerasaurus
      - Unnamed herrerasaurid
    - Eusaurischia
      - Sauropodomorpha
      - Theropoda
        - Chindesaurus
        - - Tawa
          - - Eoraptor
            - Neotheropoda

- Dinosauria
  - Ornithischia
  - Saurischia
    - Sauropodomorpha
    - Theropoda
      - Herrerasauridae
        - Staurikosaurus
        - - Herrerasaurus
          - Chindesaurus
      - - Eoraptor
        - - Daemonosaurus
          - - Tawa
            - Neotheropoda

A large phylogenetic analysis of early dinosaurs by Matthew Baron, David Norman and Paul Barrett (2017) found Herrerasauridae within the clade Saurischia, as the sister group to Sauropodomorpha. This was the result of the removal of Theropoda from Saurischia and its placement next to Ornithischia within the newly created clade Ornithoscelida.

- Dinosauria
  - Saurischia
    - Herrerasauridae
      - Staurikosaurus
      - - Herrerasaurus
        - - Sanjuansaurus
          - Chindesaurus
    - Sauropodomorpha
  - Ornithoscelida
    - Ornithischia
    - Theropoda
      - Eoraptor
      - - Tawa
        - - Eodromaeus
          - - Liliensternus
            - Neotheropoda

Baron & Williams (2018) found Herrerasauria (including Daemonosaurus, Caseosaurus and Saltopus) outside Dinosauria. A similar result was provided by the phylogenetic analysis by Cau, 2018:

- Dracohors
  - †Silesauridae (including Pisanosaurus)
  - - †Herrerasauria
      - - †Staurikosaurus
        - - †Herrerasaurus
          - †Sanjuansaurus
      - - †Daemonosaurus
        - †Tawa
    - Dinosauria
      - †Sauropodomorpha
      - - †Eodromaeus
        - Ornithoscelida
          - †Ornithischia
          - Theropoda

Novas et al., 2021 revised the fossil record of South American early dinosaurs and supported that Herrerasauria is part of Saurischia but diverging earlier than both Sauropodomorpha or Theropoda, and further corroborated the hypothesis that Chindesaurus, Daemonosaurus and Tawa are members of the clade. In 2024, Andrea Cau reclassified Herrerasauria within Theropoda.

In their 2026 description of Ptychotherates, Srivastava and Nesbitt found that Herrerasauria is basal to Saurischia using the Ezcurra et al. (2023) data set, and named the new clade Morphoraptora (lit. 'form robber', or, more loosely, 'bodysnatcher') to house Ptychotherates with Chindesaurus, Tawa and Daemonosaurus, placing them as the sister taxa to Herrerasauridae. These results are displayed in the cladogram below:

- Dinosauriformes
  - Silesauridae
  - Dinosauria
    - Ornithischia
    - Saurischia
      - Herrerasauria
        - Herrerasauridae
          - Staurikosaurus pricei
          - - Gnathovorax cabreirai
            - Herrerasaurus ischigualastensis
        - Morphoraptora
          - Chindesaurus bryansmalli
          - Daemonosaurus chauliodus
          - Ptychotherates bucculentus
          - Tawa hallae
      - Eusaurischia
        - Theropoda
        - Sauropoda
