= 2015 Philmont Scout Ranch flash flood =

Natural disaster

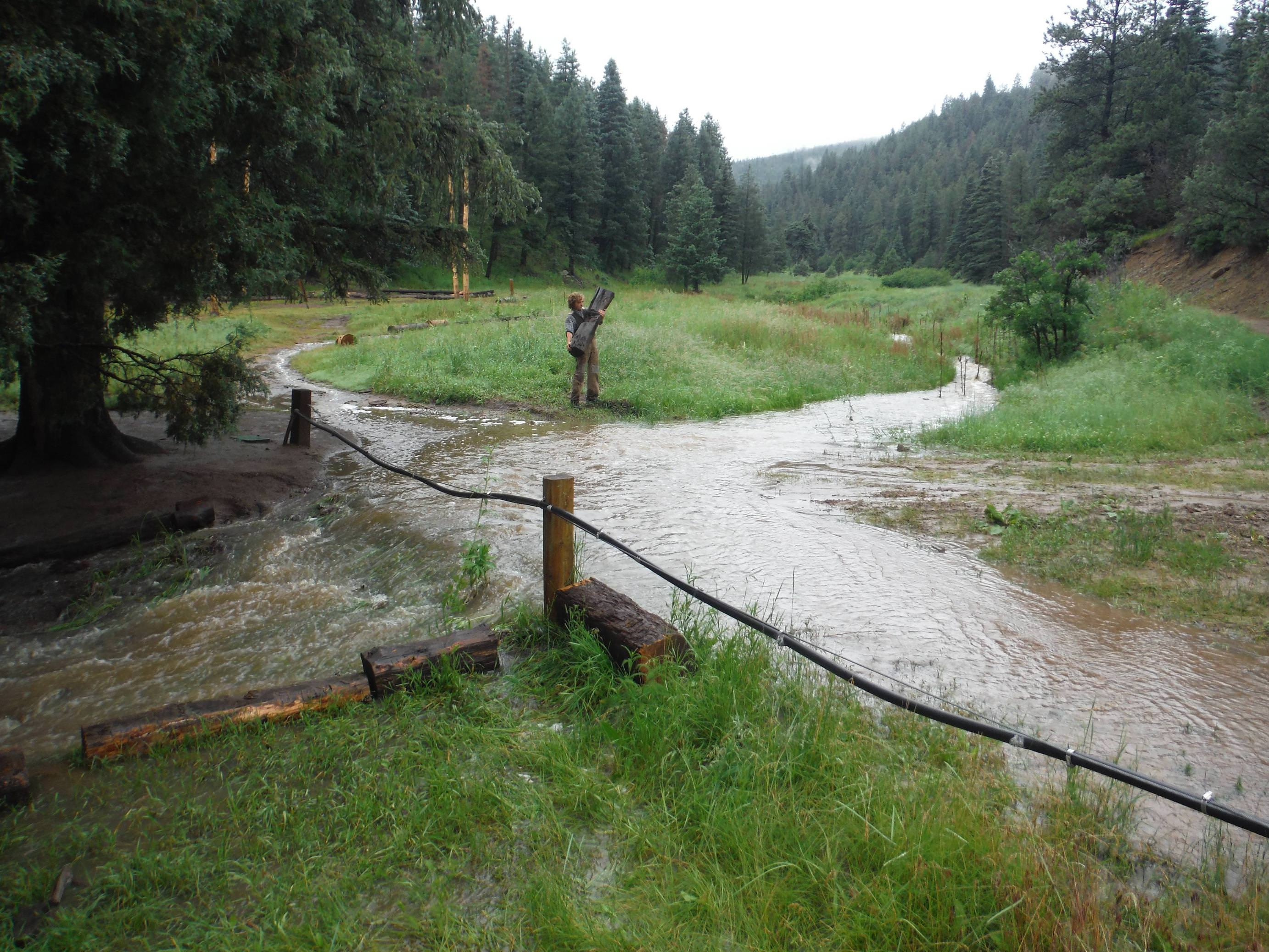
- Flooding at the Pueblano campsite
- Date: June 27, 2015
- Duration: 1-2 hours
- Location: Philmont Scout Ranch and other areas in Colfax County, New Mexico, United States; 36°27′15″N 104°57′21″W
- Type: Flash flood
- Deaths: Alden Brock

On the morning of June 27, 2015, heavy rain occurred in a great portion of the Scouting reserve Philmont Scout Ranch, which is near Cimarron, New Mexico, United States, causing a flash flood. The flood also affected some other nearby areas in Colfax County that morning, including highways and small towns around Philmont. One youth Scout, Alden Brock, who was situated in a campsite within the staff camp Indian Writings, drowned while being swept away by the flood. The flood also had a significant impact on many individual crews and treks and significantly damaged some campsites. The 2015 flash flood is the largest documented flood in the history of Philmont, and is the only flood at Philmont that has ever caused the death of a person.

== Background ==
Throughout much of the summer of 2015, parts of New Mexico were experiencing a monsoon season, likely due to an El Niño. Throughout the season, there had been many other flash flood warnings across New Mexico due to large storms. Fifty years before the 2015 flood, on June 17, 1965, a similar flash flood had occurred at Philmont Scout Ranch.

== Flood ==
On the night of June 26, the night before the flood, there were reports of hail and light rain in some areas of Philmont. On the early hours of the morning of June 27, the rain became heavier. Around 3:30 A.M., the National Weather Service issued a statement highlighting the threat of a flash flood in the area. At around 4:30 A.M., a flash flood, with water levels of over 20 feet at the highest, occurred in several areas of Philmont. Some reported loud thunder and nearby lightning strikes before and during the flood.

Outside of Philmont, there had been reports of mudflows and flooding along U.S. Route 64. Boulders also tumbled down from canyons in the Cimarron area, causing damage to and blockage of roads.

== Death of Alden Brock ==
The morning of June 27, when the flood occurred, Crew 380 from Sacramento, California, was entering the third day of their twelve-day trek. They were situated at a campsite in Indian Writings near North Ponil Canyon that was about 20 feet above a small portion of Ponil Creek. Troop 606, from Irving, Texas, had recently camped at Ponil Canyon the night before, bringing the rising rivers to staff members attention. Four members of Crew 380, including 13 year-old Alden Brock, the ranger assisting the crew, and two other youth Scouts were swept away by the flood from their campsite at about 4:30 am. The New Mexico State Police arrived at around 9:35 am on a search and rescue mission. The two Scouts and the ranger were quickly located but not Brock. They found Brock dead at around 11:00 am, approximately one mile away from the location from which he was originally swept. Crew 380 decided to finish their trek despite the incident in honor of Brock. Brock's death received nationwide attention, particularly from the Scouting community; fatalities are exceedingly rare at Philmont, and this was the only flood-related fatality in Philmont's history.

== Aftermath ==
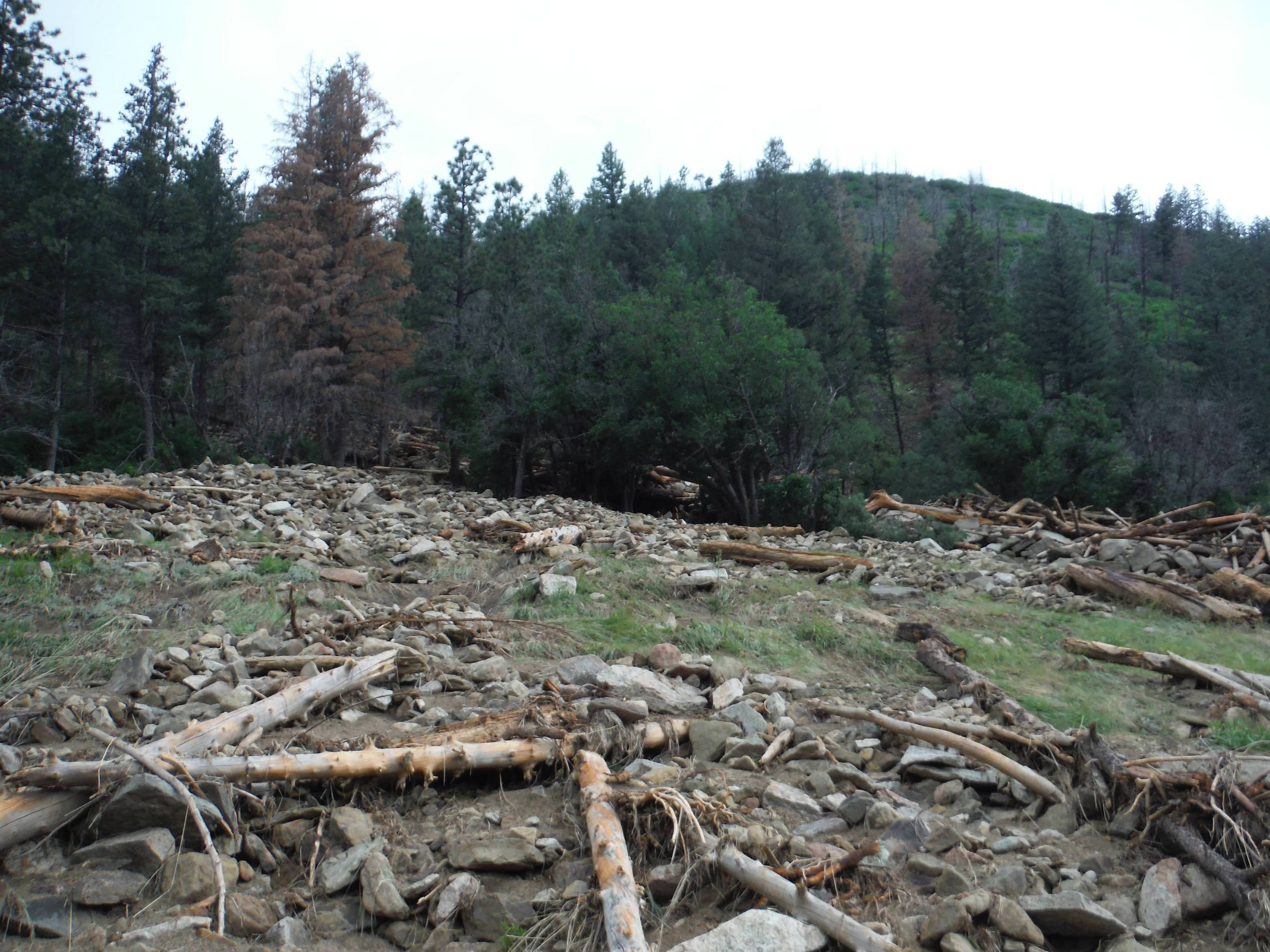
Excessive brush accumulated as a result of the flood.

Shortly after the incident, Philmont staff notified the families of Scouts involved in the flood. Many crews at Philmont associated with the flood were temporarily withheld by Philmont staff until further notice because of logistical issues and because of significant damage to trails. Philmont and the New Mexico State Police also offered counseling for those involved in the flood.

Many crews affected by the flood had lost many necessary items, such as tents, backpacks, and other camping gear. Several trails and bridges were also severely damaged by the flood.

Because of debris, mudflows, and road blockage, a large portion of U.S. Route 64 in New Mexico was closed for a period of nearly one full day.

Crews affected by the flood were given the opportunity to choose whether they were to continue their treks or to leave Philmont. Some crews decided to leave Philmont, while many decided to continue their treks.

The New Mexico State Police investigated the flood further with the intent of providing more information to improve future preparedness, but came to no conclusions. The investigators believed that the incident could not have easily been prevented. Some campsites at Ponil, Cook Canyon, and Indian Writings were moved to higher ground.

== See also ==
- 2015 Ghost Ranch flash flood
- Ute Park Fire
