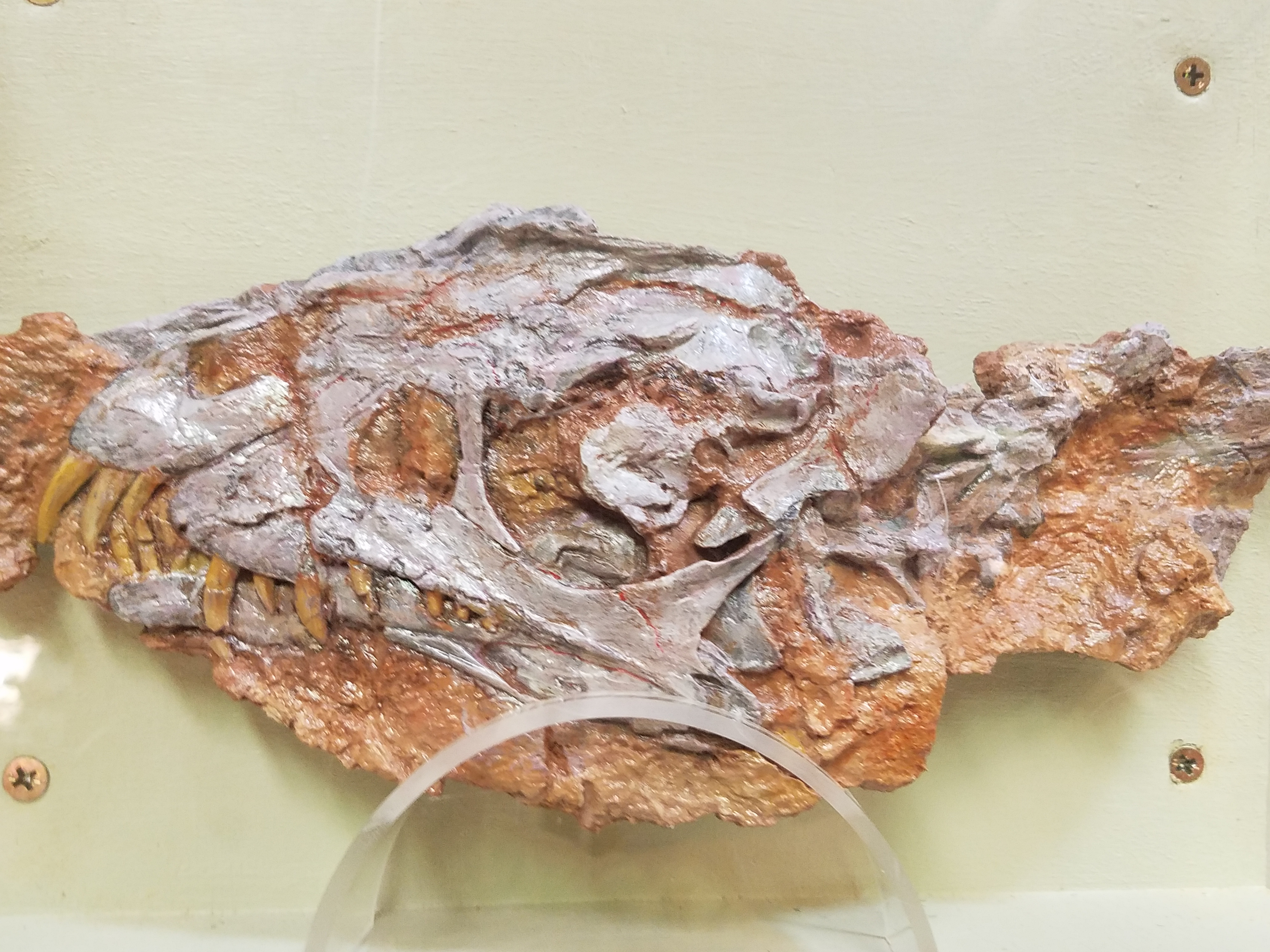
- Cast of the skull, displayed at the Ruth Hall Museum at Ghost Ranch

Scientific classification
- Kingdom: Animalia
- Phylum: Chordata
- Class: Reptilia
- Clade: Dinosauria
- Clade: Saurischia
- Clade: †Herrerasauria
- Clade: †Morphoraptora
- Genus: †Daemonosaurus; Sues et al. 2011
- Species: †D. chauliodus

Binomial name
- †Daemonosaurus chauliodus Sues et al. 2011

= Daemonosaurus =

Daemonosaurus Temporal range: late Norian - Rhaetian?

Genus of reptiles (fossil)

Daemonosaurus is an extinct genus of possible theropod dinosaur from the Late Triassic of New Mexico. The only known fossil is a skull and neck fragments from deposits of the latest Triassic Chinle Formation at Ghost Ranch. Daemonosaurus was an unusual dinosaur with a short skull and large, fang-like teeth. It lived alongside early neotheropods such as Coelophysis, which would have been among the most common dinosaurs by the end of the Triassic. However, Daemonosaurus retains several plesiomorphic ("primitive") traits of the snout, and it likely lies outside the clade Neotheropoda. It may be considered a late-surviving basal theropod or non-theropod basal saurischian, possibly allied to other early predatory dinosaurs such as herrerasaurids or Tawa. A 2026 study named the clade Morphoraptora for Daemonosaurus, Tawa, and other proposed herrerasaurians of the southwest United States.

== Discovery ==
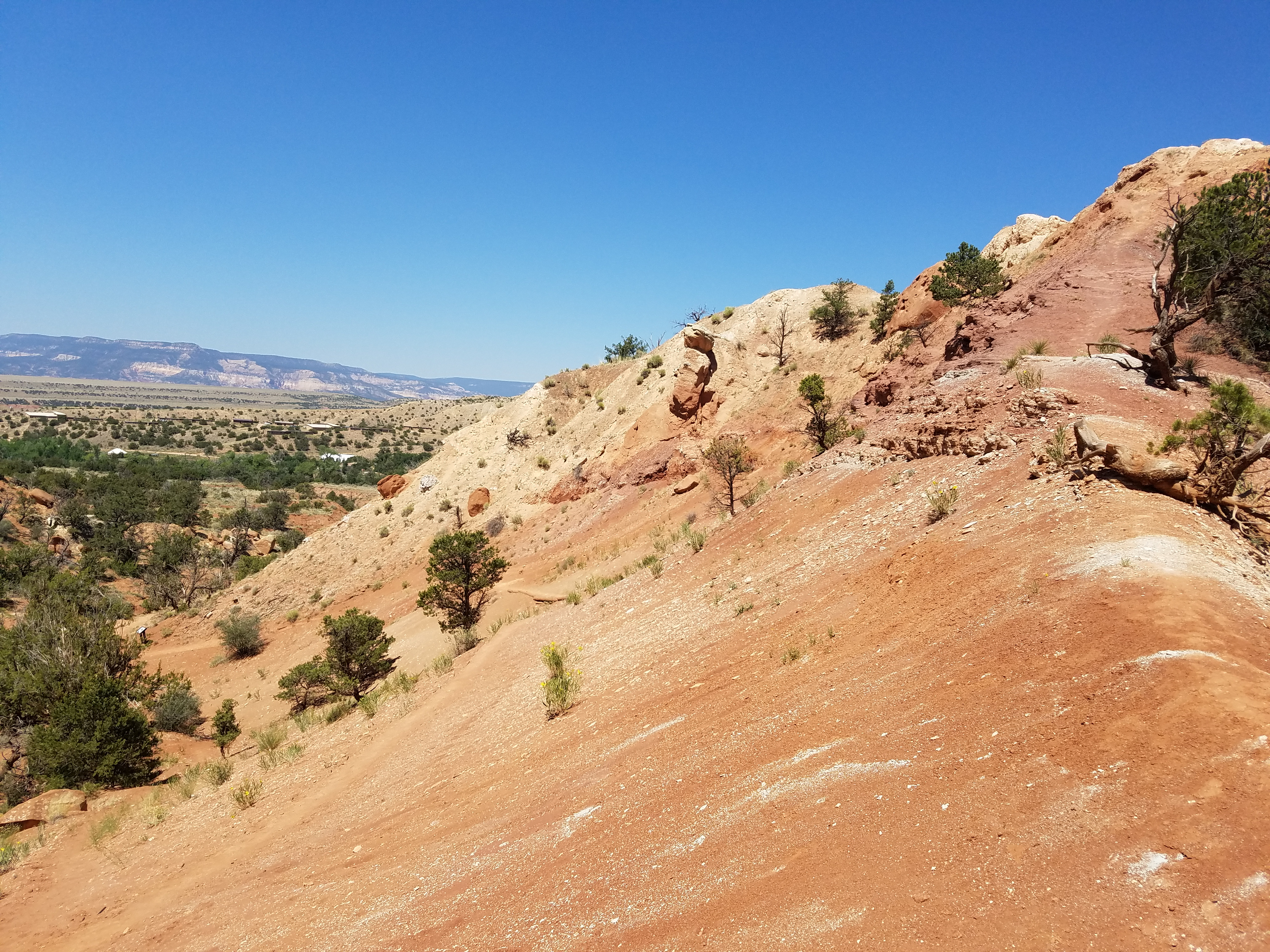
The Whitaker Quarry of Ghost Ranch as it appears in 2019.

Daemonosaurus is known from a single fossil, the holotype CM 76821, which consists of a skull, mandibles, an atlas bone, an axis bone, other neck vertebrae, and rib fragments. This specimen was discovered in a sediment block of collected from the Coelophysis Quarry (also known as the Whitaker quarry) at Ghost Ranch, New Mexico. This site, preserving the informal late Norian or Rhaetian "siltstone member" of the Chinle Formation, is famous for abundant fossils of Coelophysis, an early theropod. C-4-81, the block containing CM 76821, was collected in the early 1980s by E.H. Colbert and is now housed in the collection of the Carnegie Museum of Natural History in Pittsburgh, Pennsylvania. Fossils of Coelophysis were also present in the block. CM 76821 was first uncovered by a volunteer preparing the block while it was on loan to State Museum of Pennsylvania in Harrisburg.

Daemonosaurus was named by Hans-Dieter Sues, Sterling J. Nesbitt, David S. Berman and Amy C. Henrici in the journal Proceedings of the Royal Society B in 2011 and the type species is Daemonosaurus chauliodus. The generic name Daemonosaurus is derived from the Greek words "daimon" (δαίμων) meaning "demon" and "sauros" (σαύρα) meaning "reptile". The specific name is derived from the Greek word "chauliodous" (χαυλιόδους) meaning "prominent toothed", which is in reference to its procumbent front teeth.

== Description ==
Daemonosaurus is notable for its short, deep skull, with large teeth, a rounded orbit (eye socket) and a relatively small antorbital fenestra. Based on the proportions of related theropods, Daemonosaurus is estimated to have been around 1.5 m (5 feet) long according to Sues. An estimate by Holtz (2012) suggests that Daemonosaurus was at most 2.2 m (7 ft) long with a weight around that of a beaver, 9.1–22.7 kilograms (20–50 pounds). These estimates are almost entirely conjectural, as no postcranial fossils are preserved beyond a few vertebrae. The proportionately large orbit, the short snout, and the apparent lack of fusion between the bones of the braincase suggest that the holotype specimen CM 76821 may be a juvenile. On the other hand, the closure (fusion) of the neurocentral sutures in the vertebrae suggest a mature individual.

=== Cranium ===
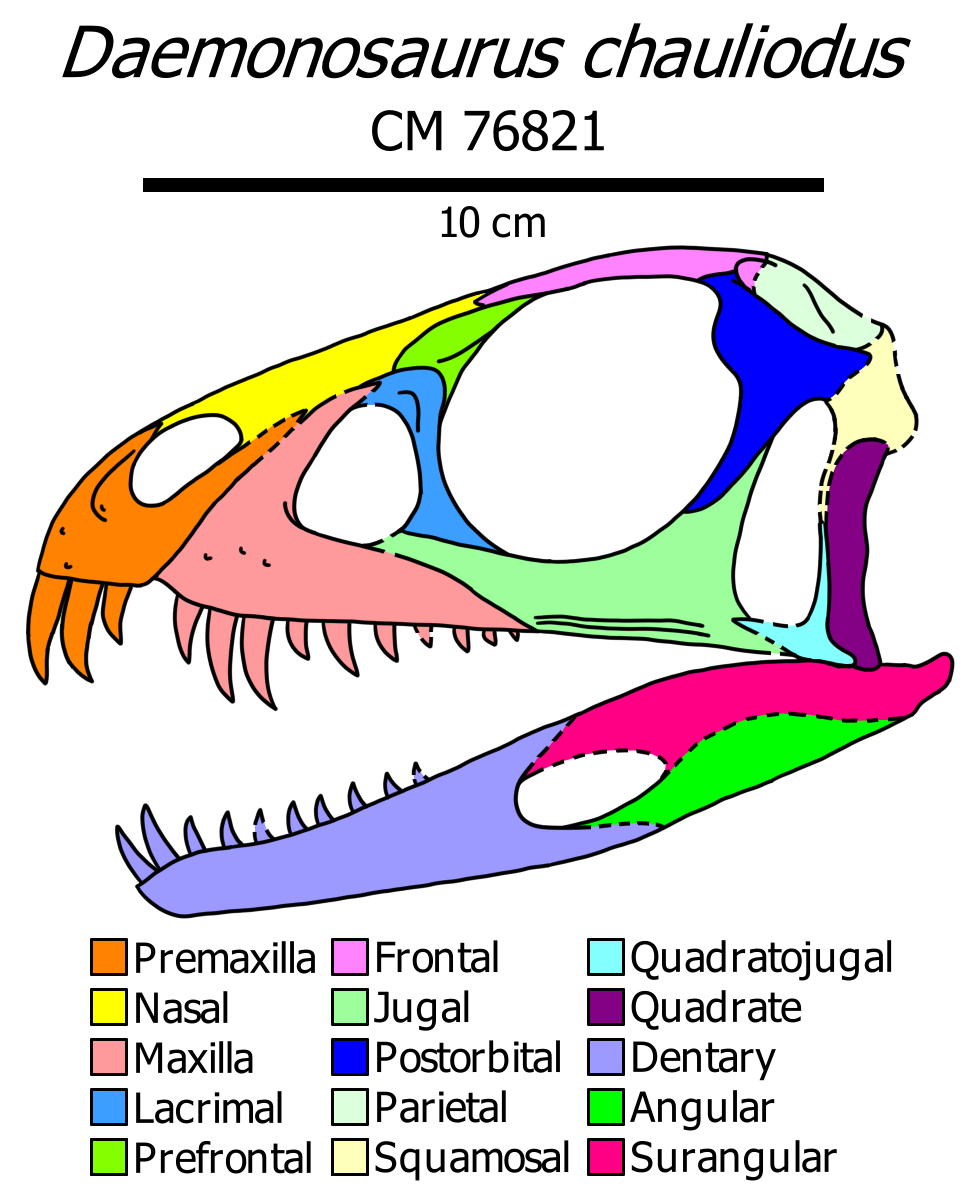
Skull diagram with elongated teeth (according to Nesbitt & Sues, 2020)

The premaxilla is deep and has a sloped front edge. The posterodorsal process (rear branch) of the premaxilla is broad and elongated, forming the entire rear edge of the relatively large naris (nostril hole). The size of the posterodorsal process is more in line with Herrerasaurus and ornithischians than with traditional theropods or sauropodomorphs. There are only three premaxillary teeth, like Tawa, Gnathovorax, Heterodontosaurus, and an unnamed Brazilian herrerasaurid, but unlike other early dinosaurs, which have four. The premaxillary teeth are characteristically elongated, with the first tooth being the longest in the entire skull. CT scans demonstrate that this is a natural quality of the skull, as the teeth were not significantly displaced from their sockets. The premaxillary teeth are straight at the root and curved at the crown. All three are smooth on the front edge and finely serrated on the rear edge, and shallow grooves ornament the second and third teeth.

Similar to many early dinosaurs, a small diastema (toothless notch) was present at the lower contact between the premaxilla and maxilla. Like Tawa and Herrerasaurus, the outer surface of the maxilla is generally smooth and flat; there are no sharp ridges delimiting the tooth row or the shallow, upwards-oriented antorbital fossa. Nevertheless, there are a few pits on the outer surface, and a ridge-like palatal process on the inner surface. The maxilla has 10 teeth at most, fewer than any other early dinosaur. While the recurved second and third maxillary teeth are nearly as long as the premaxillary teeth, the rest of the teeth gradually diminish in size and curvature towards the rear of the bone. On the other hand, serrations become more extensive on each tooth further down the tooth row.

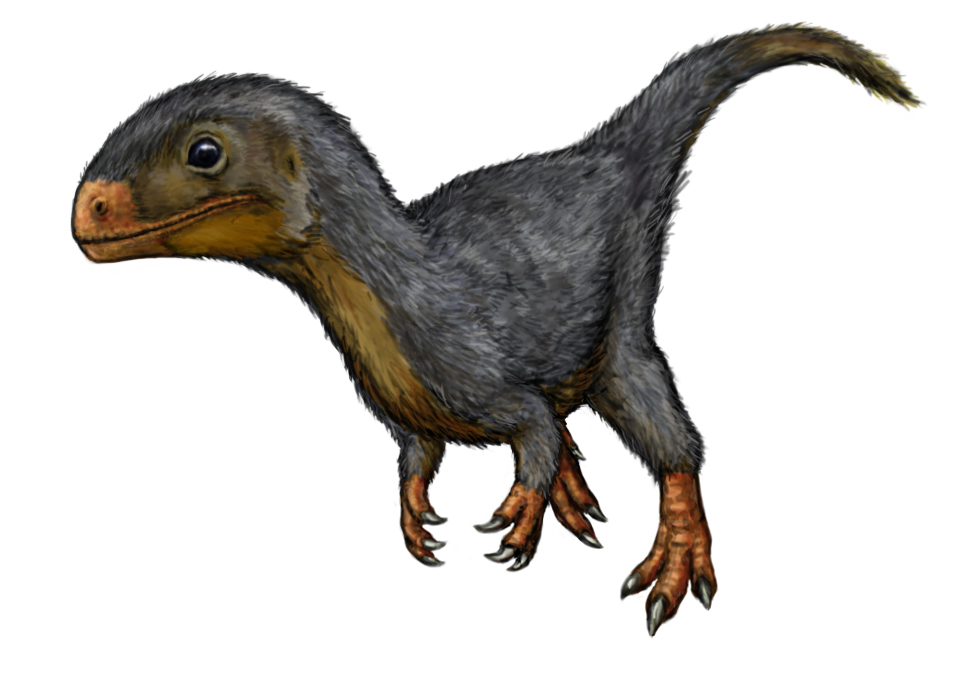
Life restoration

The nasal is smooth and likely did not participate in the antorbital fossa. Each nasal has M-shaped sutures with the premaxilla and frontal, a more complex configuration than in other early dinosaurs. The lacrimal is thinnest at mid-height and sends a sharp projection along the lower edge of the orbit. It forms the rear edge of the antorbital fossa via a subtle ridge. The prefrontal is proportionally large, forming about half the upper edge of the orbit. The size of the prefrontal is unique to Daemonosaurus among dinosaurs and archosaurs in general. The frontals are wide and flat, separated from each other at the front by a wedge-shaped projection of the nasals. Their rear edge is excavated by the supratemporal fossa, which extends onto the broad and mostly flat parietal, as well as the fairly large postorbital. The postorbital likely contacted the frontal along a straight edge (like Tawa and Herrerasaurus), while also sending a rounded overhanging projection into the orbit (like most early saurischians).

The jugal is moderately deep, with a thick front prong. Like neotheropods and a few sauropodomorphs, the rear edge of the jugal bore a deep notch for the front of the quadratojugal. The jugal's lower edge has a sharp ridge that projects straight down, an unusual configuration not seen in other dinosaurs. The quadratojugal is lightly built, with narrow front and upper prongs similar to Eoraptor. At its upper extent it contacts the squamosal, a poorly-preserved bone with an overall boxy shape. The quadrate is tall and narrow.

Fragments of the palate appear similar to other dinosaurs, with curved ectopterygoids underlapped by broad pterygoids. The palatine bone is large, sending out a diagonal lateral ridge to connect to the inner surface of the maxilla. The braincase is partially disarticulated; each otoccipital (outer rear segment of the braincase) sends out a paroccipital process with parallel margins (like other saurischians), while its base bears a pair of openings for cranial nerve XII. Unlike more advanced saurischians, the exoccipital region is flat, without a vertical lateral crest. Fragments of the basioccipital, prootic, and parabasisphenoid are also preserved. Scleral rings were present in each eye, with at least 11 ossicles overlapping in a counterclockwise pattern.

=== Lower jaw ===
The front of the mandible (lower jaw) has a slightly downturned tooth row, similar to many sauropodomorphs. The symphysis (chin) is dotted with small pits and converges towards a sharp margin. The dentary (tooth-bearing portion of the jaw) has an estimated ten teeth, which are curved and serrated. The first tooth is large and slightly inset from the tip of the jaw, the second tooth is the largest in the lower jaw, and the rest decrease in size to the back of the jaw. The rear of the jaw is poorly-preserved but appears to be similar in structure to that of Herrerasaurus.

=== Vertebrae ===
Fragments of five cervical (neck) vertebrae are preserved alongside the skull. A slender proatlas links the neck with the braincase. The atlas (first cervical) has a thin neural arch bearing a shallow depression followed by epipophyses, akin to Herrerasaurus. Epipophyses are also found in the axis (second cervical), which is better preserved and has a slanted neural spine on top of a rectangular centrum. The third cervical has prominent prezygapophyses and is unusual among dinosauriforms in that it lacks a keel on its lower edge. A very large rimmed oval-shaped hole is present behind the rib articulations. This hole has been equated with pneumatic pockets ("pleurocoels") observed in Tawa, Chindesaurus, and neotheropods. Cervical ribs are robust and have two closely set points of contact with the vertebrae. The fourth and fifth cervicals are fragmentary.

== Classification ==
Daemonosaurus is typically considered to be a basal theropod that lies outside the clade Neotheropoda, a group that includes more advanced Triassic theropods (like Coelophysis) and their descendants. With such a basal position, Daemonosaurus represents a lineage that extended from the earliest radiation of dinosaurs in the Middle Triassic alongside forms such as Eoraptor and Herrerasaurus from South America. A phylogenetic analysis conducted in its original description found Daemonosaurus chauliodus to be closely related to Tawa hallae, a theropod that was described from Ghost Ranch in 2009, and the Neotheropoda. Although the two theropods are closely related, Tawa was found at a quarry that is slightly older than the Whitaker Quarry at Ghost Ranch. Sues et al. (2011) noted that the discovery of Daemonosaurus provided "additional support for the theropod affinities of both Eoraptor and Herrerasauridae and (demonstrated) that lineages from the initial radiation of Dinosauria persisted until the end of the Triassic." Below is a cladogram based on the phylogenetic analysis conducted by Sues et al. in 2011, showing the relationships of Daemonosaurus:

- Theropoda
  - - Staurikosaurus
    - - Herrerasaurus
      - Chindesaurus
  - - Eoraptor
    - - Daemonosaurus
      - - Tawa
        - Neotheropoda
          - - Megapnosaurus
            - Coelophysis
          - - Liliensternus
            - - Zupaysaurus
              - - Cryolophosaurus
                - - Dilophosaurus
                  - Jurassic theropods

Examination of this genus by Sues et al. (2011) demonstrates that Daemonosaurus is separate and distinct from its other contemporaries. Daemonosaurus differs from Herrerasaurus based on key features in the skull and because it has much larger teeth in the premaxilla. Daemonosaurus differs from Eodromaeus based on features of the jaw bone, skull, cheek bones, and because it has much larger teeth in the premaxilla. Daemonosaurus differs from Eoraptor lunensis based on the presence of much larger premaxillary and anterior maxillary teeth and a much more restricted antorbital fossa on the maxilla. Daemonosaurus differs from Tawa hallae and Coelophysis bauri in features of the skull bones. Daemonosaurus differs from Chindesaurus bryansmalli in features of the cervical vertebrae.

A paper published by Baron et al. (2017) resurrected the clade Ornithoscelida to unite ornithischians and theropods to the exception of sauropodomorphs. Although not included in the original study, the authors added Daemonosaurus to their dataset after their hypothesis was criticized by a team of international researchers, Langer et al. (2017). In Baron et al.'s response, Daemonosaurus was found to be the earliest ornithischian, retaining many theropod-like characteristics.

Nesbitt and Sues (2020) rescored the genus and reran the analyses of both Langer et al. (2017) and Baron et al. (2017). Langer et al.'s analysis resulted in a large polytomy placing Daemonosaurus as either a basal saurischian, a herrerasaurid, or a basal silesaurid. When Agnosphitys (a fragmentary possible silesaurid) was removed from the analysis, Daemonosaurus was placed as the sister taxon to Eusaurischia, which encompassed the theropod-sauropodomorph split. The rescoring of Baron et al.'s analysis placed Daemonosaurus as an ornithoscelidan outside the ornithichian-theropod split. This area was also occupied by Tawa and Chindesaurus. Although Daemonosaurus was not recovered as an ornithichian in any analysis, it also does not share any clear unambiguous characteristics exclusively with theropods. Though Nesbitt and Sues (2020) considered Daemonosaurus a likely saurischian, they were unable to conclusively place the genus within any subgroup of Dinosauria.

Novas et al. (2021) and Strivastava and Nesbitt (2026) recovered Daemonosaurus in a clade (which the latter study named Morphoraptora), alongside Tawa, Chindesaurus, and Ptychotherates (another short-snouted carnivorous dinosaur from the Coelophysis quarry). Morphoraptora is recovered as the sister group to Herrerasauridae, with both combined into Herrerasauria, a broader saurischian clade sister to Eusaurischia.

- Silesauridae
- Dinosauria
  - Ornithischia
  - Saurischia
    - Eusaurischia
      - Sauropodomorpha
      - Theropoda
        - Eodromaeus
        - Neotheropoda
    - Herrerasauria
      - Herrerasauridae
      - Morphoraptora
        - Daemonosaurus
        - Tawa
        - Chindesaurus
        - Ptychotherates

== Paleoenvironment ==
The only specimen of Daemonosaurus was recovered at the Coelophysis (Whitaker) quarry at Ghost Ranch in Rio Arriba County, New Mexico. This site preserves pebbly, calcareous conglomerate rich in fossils of many different animals, with the theropod dinosaur Coelophysis being particularly abundant. It has been correlated the Siltstone Member of the Chinle Formation, which is tentatively dated to the Rhaetian (or possibly latest Norian) stage of the Late Triassic period.

Ghost Ranch was located close to the equator 200 million years ago, and had a warm, monsoon-like climate with heavy seasonal precipitation. The paleoenvironment of the Whitaker quarry included a diverse collection of rhynchocephalians (like Whitakersaurus), archosauromorphs, and archosaurs. Archosauriform taxa present include phytosaurs (Redondasaurus), crocodylomorphs (Hesperosuchus), shuvosaurids (Effigia), the silesaurid Eucoelophysis, and the dinosaur Coelophysis.

=== Taphonomy ===
The multitude of specimens deposited so closely together at Ghost Ranch was probably the result of a flash flood event. Such flooding was commonplace during this period of the Earth's history and, indeed, the nearby Petrified Forest of Arizona is the result of a preserved log jam of tree trunks that were caught in one such flood. In 1989, Colbert noted that the Daemonosaurus specimen and several Coelophysis specimens were washed into a small pond, where they drowned and were buried by a sheet flood event from a nearby river."
