= 2015 Ghost Ranch flash flood =

2015 flash flood in New Mexico, USA

- Date: 7 July 2015
- Duration: 30-45 minutes
- Location: Ghost Ranch in Abiquiú, New Mexico, United States
- Type: Flash flood

On the evening of 7 July 2015, a flash flood occurred as a result of a large storm in the art education and retreat center Ghost Ranch, which is near Abiquiú, New Mexico, United States. There were several hundred people at the ranch during the flood, but the flood did not cause any injuries or deaths. The flood caused the destruction of several facilities on the ranch, which are planned to eventually be reconstructed.

== Background ==
Throughout the summer of 2015, a great portion of the state of New Mexico was experiencing a wet season, likely because of an El Niño, which included several cases of heavy rain, hail, and storms. A similar flash flood had occurred on the morning of June 27 of the same year at Philmont Scout Ranch, a Scouting reserve near Cimarron, New Mexico. There had also been street and highway flash floods in various parts of New Mexico throughout that summer. The National Weather Service claimed that there had not been any floods in the Ghost Ranch area before the 2015 flood of this extremity in their records.

== Course of events ==
A large storm with heavy rain occurred at Ghost Ranch on 7 July 2015. That evening, arroyos in the area had overflowed, causing a flash flood, with waters up to 27 feet at the highest, to sweep through a large portion of the property. People at the ranch were soon evacuated onto higher grounds, and the evacuation was successful; none were injured or killed. The flood destroyed several buildings at the ranch, eroded two trails, and caused boulders to tumble down from the mesas. Some claimed that the flood ended 30 to 45 minutes later.

== Aftermath ==
A short time after the flash flood ended, a double rainbow appeared over the property. Debra Hepler, the executive director of Ghost Ranch, described the rainbow as "the promise of God’s love and hope times two," as no injuries or deaths resulted from the flood.

The specific facilities that were destroyed were the Fiber Arts Studio, a ropes course area, an equipment shed, an aqueduct, Pot Hollow, Short House, and Pole Barn. Activities in those facilities were temporarily moved to other facilities on the property in order to await possible reconstruction. Some parts of the Box Canyon trail as well as the entire Matrimonial Mesa trail at the ranch were also inaccessible due to the aftermath of the flood. Some victims received counseling due to posttraumatic stress.

The expenses of the flood were mostly covered by flood insurance. However, the ranch received a deductible of $100,000. Ghost Ranch and its parent organization, Presbyterian Church (USA), held several fundraisers throughout the year to meet their deductible and to fund for the reconstruction of facilities that were destroyed.

== In popular culture ==
Shortly after the flood, Ghost Ranch published a short poem called "The Flash Flood" that was inspired by the flood. The poem was written by a participant in the ranch's Weave & Wonder program who helped with evacuation during the flood.
