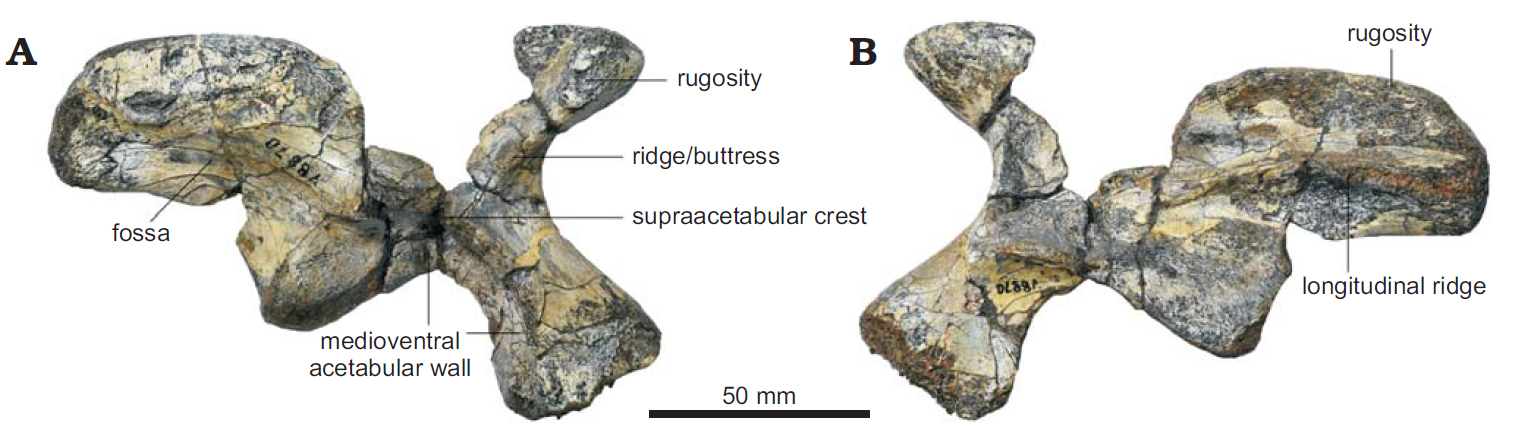
- Holotype ilium in lateral and medial view

Scientific classification
- Kingdom: Animalia
- Phylum: Chordata
- Class: Reptilia
- Clade: Dinosauria
- Clade: Saurischia
- Genus: †Caseosaurus; Hunt et al., 1998

Type species
- †Caseosaurus crosbyensis Hunt et al., 1998

= Caseosaurus =

Caseosaurus Temporal range: Norian, 221.5–212 Ma

Extinct genus of dinosaurs

Caseosaurus (/ˌkeɪzioʊˈsɔːrəs/ KAY-zee-oh-SOR-əs) is a genus of saurischian dinosaur that lived approximately 221.5 to 212 million years ago during the latter part of the Triassic Period in what is now Texas, North America. It was a small, lightly-built, bipedal, ground-dwelling carnivore, and could grow up to 2 m (6.6 ft) long.

== Description ==
The genus Caseosaurus, is known from specimen UMMP 8870, an isolated hip bone measuring nearly 141 mm. A 3D model of this specimen is available on the University of Michigan Online Repository of Fossils. Size estimates suggest that Caseosaurus was up to 2 m (6.6 ft) long and weighed up to 50 kilograms (110.2 pounds) at most.

== Discovery ==
The genus name Caseosaurus means "Case's lizard", and was named in honor of the scientist who discovered it, Ermine Cowles Case. The suffix "-saurus" Greek(σαυρος) means "lizard". The specific name crosbyensis, is a Latinized rendering of Crosby County in Texas, the site of its discovery. Caseosaurus was described, and named by A. P. Hunt, Spencer G. Lucas, Andrew B. Heckert, Robert M. Sullivan, and Martin Lockley in 1998, with the type species being Caseosaurus crosbyensis.

== Classification ==
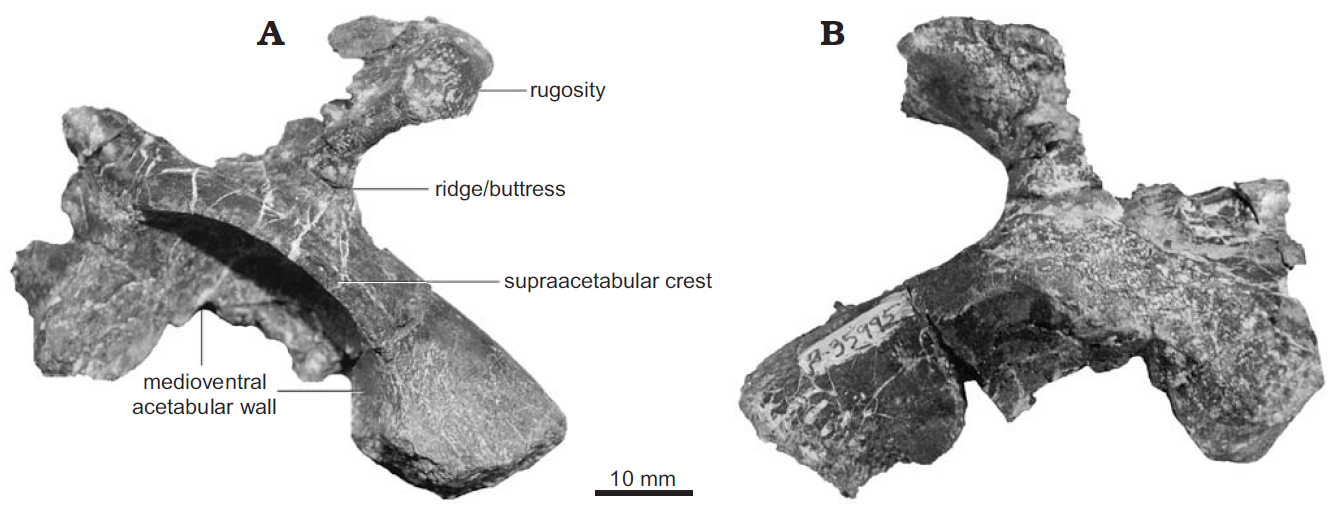
Referred ilium

In 1998, Hunt et al., examined UMMP 8870, a partial hip bone (ilium) originally assigned as a paratype of the dinosaur Chindesaurus, and designated it as the holotype of a new dinosaur, Caseosaurus crosbyensis. Irmis et al. concluded that an ilium, NMMNH P-35995 originally assigned by Heckert et al. in 2000 to the silesaurid Eucoelophysis, strongly resembles the Caseosaurus holotype. Langer (2004) examined the ilium and reassigned it back to the genus Chindesaurus.

However, in 2018, Caseosaurus was considered a valid species, and was identified as a relative of Herrerasaurus, outside of the Dinosauria.

=== Distinguishing anatomical features ===
According to Baron and Williams (2018), Caseosaurus can be distinguished from all dinosaurs (including herrerasaurids, which are placed outside Dinosauria in their analysis) by a distinctive feature: a sharp, well developed ridge connects the midpoint of the supracetabular crest to the preacetabular process. However, a recent review of early South American dinosaurs has classified it as a nomen dubium without addressing the previous study.

== Paleoecology ==
The only specimen of Caseosaurus was discovered in the Tecovas Formation of the Dockum Group in Texas, within sediments deposited during the Norian stage of the Late Triassic period, approximately 221.5 to 212 million years ago. The paleoenvironment of Caseosaurus's included the archosaur Tecovasaurus and other early theropod dinosaurs, some of which left preserved bipedal tracks.
