= Ghost Ranch =

Ghost Ranch El Rancho de los Brujos
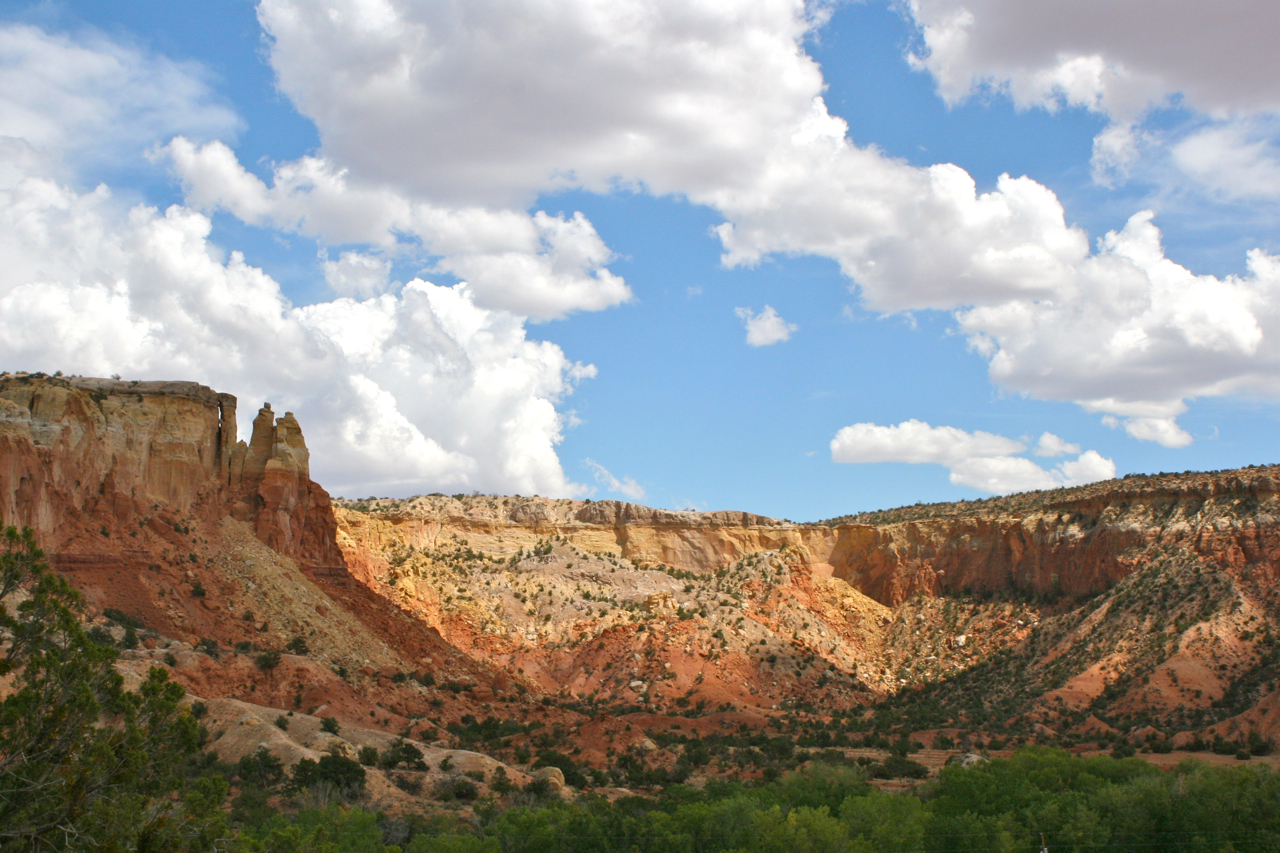

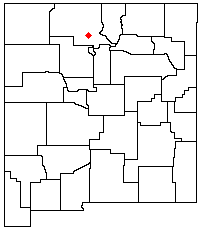
- Coordinates: 36°19′47.24″N 106°28′26.4″W
- Country: United States
- State: New Mexico
- County: Rio Arriba
- Website: www.ghostranch.org

U.S. National Natural Landmark
- Designated: 1975

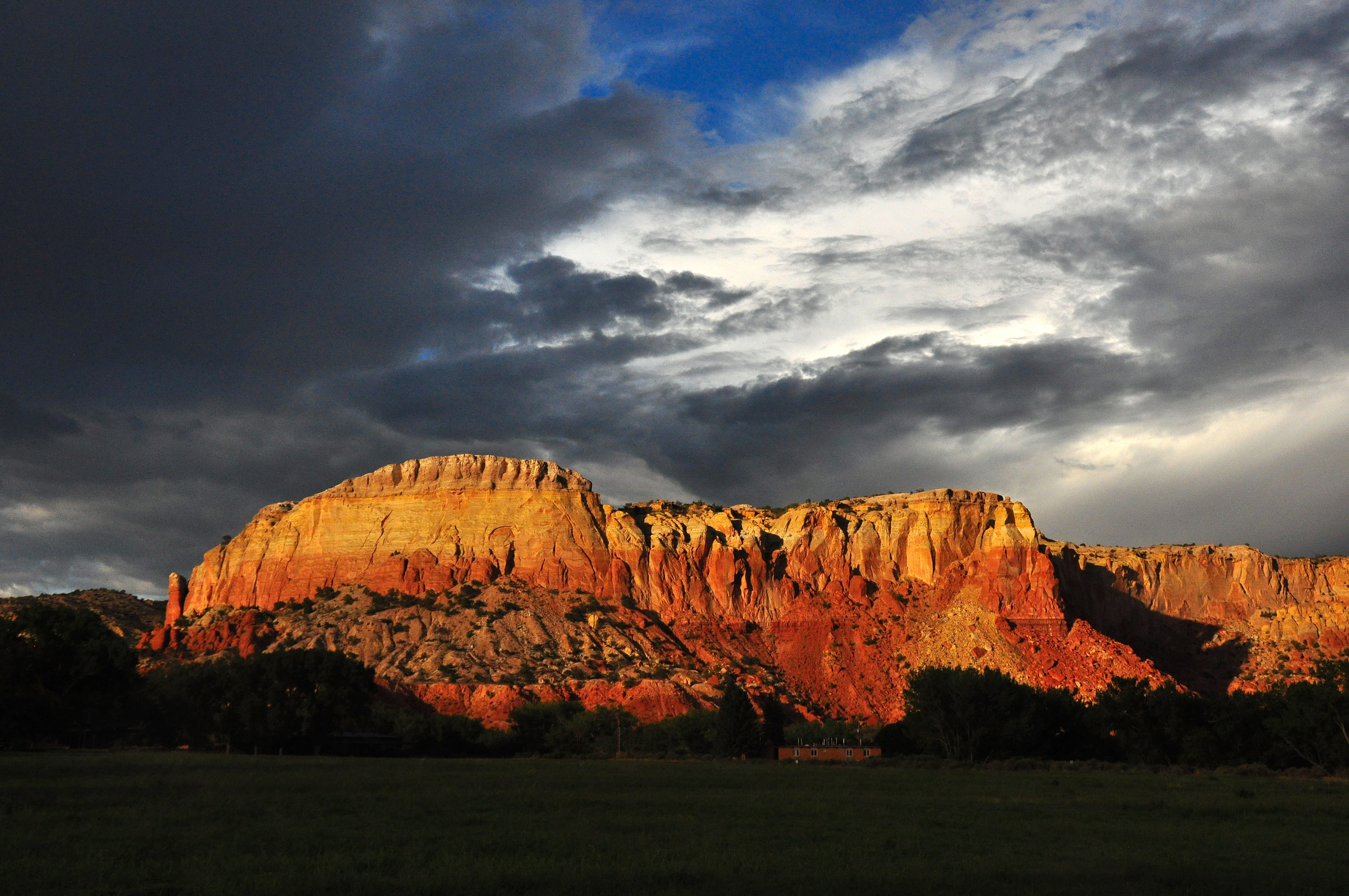
Ghost Ranch redrock cliffs and clouds

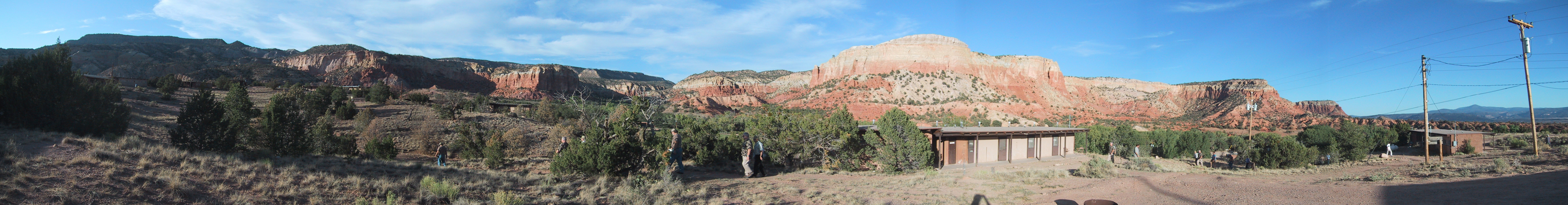
Ghost Ranch, New Mexico

Ghost Ranch is a 21,000-acre (85 km^{2}) retreat and education center in Rio Arriba County in north central New Mexico, United States. It is about 65 miles northwest of Santa Fe and 14 miles from Abiquiu, the nearest community. In the later 20th century, it was the summer home and studio of artist Georgia O'Keeffe, as well as the subject of many of her paintings. It often serves as a location for movie production. Ghost Ranch is owned by the Presbyterian Church (USA) and leased to and managed by The National Ghost Ranch Foundation, Inc.

Ghost Ranch is known for a remarkable concentration of fossils, most notably that of the theropod dinosaur Coelophysis, of which it has been estimated that nearly a thousand individuals have been preserved in a quarry at Ghost Ranch.

== History ==
Ghost Ranch is part of Piedra Lumbre (Spanish, "Shining Rock"), a 1766 land grant to Pedro Martin Serrano from King Charles III of Spain. The Rito del Yeso is a stream that meanders through the canyons and gorge, providing a drought-resistant source of water. In 1976, Ghost Ranch was designated as a National Natural Landmark by the National Park Service.

The canyon was first inhabited in the 1880s by the Archuleta brothers, cattle rustlers who enjoyed the coverage and invisibility that the canyon provided as well as their ability to see for miles down the valley. They created two jacal homes and would move stolen cattle throughout the night to Box Canyon. By transporting the cattle through streams, footprints would be lost and they could not be tracked. Stories of people staying with the Archuleta brothers who had gone missing (and their clothing on the men) circulated around the area. One day one of the brothers made a transaction without the other, and claimed he had buried the gold for safety. The second brother killed him, and kept his wife and daughter hostage until they admitted to knowing where the gold was hidden. Although the mother and daughter feared the rumored spirits of the canyon, they mustered up the courage to sneak away at night through the Chama Valley. The Mother and the daughter informed locals about the remaining brother. A group of local men then came to the ranch, fighting through their fear, and hanged the remaining brother and his gang from a cottonwood tree that still stands next to one of the casitas on the property. Other visitors who stayed in the casita later on claimed they could hear voices of a man and a woman fighting. A descendant of the Archuletas obtained a deed for the property in 1918. He sold the ranch in 1921 to an area merchant, who sold it in 1928 to a sheep rancher.

=== Arthur Pack ===
Roy Pfaffle, a guide, outfitter and former park ranger, won the deed to the undeveloped ranch sometime early in 1928 in a poker game, details of which remain shrouded in mystery. His wife Carol (née Caroline Bishop Stanley), a graduate of the New England Conservatory of Music who had ventured West in 1915, recorded the deed in her name and decided to call the property Ghost Ranch, reflecting legend and lore about evil spirits in the area. Stanley moved there in 1931 after divorcing Pfaffle, who suffered gambling and drinking problems. Stanley led the construction of guest quarters and created an exclusive dude ranch that was visited by wealthy and creative people of the time. Eventually many of her friends moved to New Mexico for its peaceful atmosphere. One of the most influential to visit Ghost Ranch was Arthur Newton Pack, writer and editor of Nature Magazine. Pack's daughter suffered from bouts of pneumonia, so he and his family moved to an area with a drier climate. Although Stanley's clientele were wealthy, she had difficulty making a profit, and after 1929 the Great Depression severely reduced tourism. Stanley sold the ranch to Arthur Pack in 1935.

As Pack aged, he grew concerned about the future of the ranch. He spoke with the YMCA, the Boy Scouts of America, the Archdiocese of Santa Fe, and the United Brethren Church about acquiring and maintaining the ranch, but none of the organizations was in a position to accept. The Presbyterian Church accepted his offer, and in 1955 Pack donated the ranch to the church for use as an educational center, though the church faced difficulties developing it. The ranch is now used by various organizations and teachers that offer over 300 workshops, classes, outdoor activities and spiritual retreats each year.

=== Georgia O'Keeffe ===
Georgia O'Keeffe, intrigued by Arthur Pack's statement that the Piedra Lumbre was "the best place in the world", visited the ranch and fell in love with the geography. Soon thereafter, she split her time between New York and New Mexico. She enjoyed having alone time, and was often very demanding of the Packs. Cerro Pedernal was a key geographical feature that could be often found in her paintings. After she moved to New Mexico full time, she spent most of the year at what is now preserved as the Georgia O'Keeffe Home and Studio in Abiquiu, but she lived and worked at a villa and studio in the cooler elevations at Ghost Ranch in summer.

=== 2015 flash flood ===
On July 7, 2015, a flash flood occurred in Ghost Ranch due to severe weather, and destroyed several buildings at the ranch. No injuries or deaths were caused by the flood.

== Geology and palaeontology ==
200 million years ago Ghost Ranch and the American Southwest were located close to the equator, and had a warm, monsoon-like climate with heavy seasonal precipitation. Ghost Ranch includes a famous palaeontological site preserving Triassic dinosaurs. Fossil bones were found here as early as 1885. In 1947 the palaeontologist Edwin H. Colbert documented the discovery of over a thousand well-preserved fossilized skeletons of a small Triassic dinosaur called Coelophysis in a quarry here. In 2007, fossil remains of Dromomeron romeri, one of the group of animals recognized as basal dinosauromorphs, were found in the Hayden Quarry. In April 2010, a team of scientists led by Hans-Dieter Sues of the Smithsonian Institution reported the discovery of Daemonosaurus chauliodus, a basal theropod species, at Ghost Ranch. Daemonosaurus lived approximately 205 million years ago, during a transitional period between the oldest known dinosaurs such as Herrerasaurus, which existed during the Late Triassic period in what is now known as Argentina and Brazil, and the more advanced theropod dinosaurs.

Effigia, a genus of small Shuvosaurid pseudosuchian, was also uncovered from Ghost Ranch, though it was not recognized for decades following Edwin Colbert's 1947 expedition.

== Cinematography ==
Ghost Ranch's redrock scenery and 21,000 acres (8,500 hectares) have attracted many filmmakers. Here is a partial list of films and series shot at Ghost Ranch:

- The Light That Failed (1939)
- And Now Miguel (1966) included Ghost Ranch staff members James Hall and Heil Waters in small roles.
- Showdown (1973)
- Red Dawn (1984)
- Silverado (1985)
- Outrageous Fortune (1987)
- City Slickers (1991)
- The Last Outlaw (1993)
- Earth 2 (1994 television series)
- Wyatt Earp (1994)
- Wild Wild West (1999)
- All the Pretty Horses (2000)
- The Missing (2003)
- No Country for Old Men (2007)
- 3:10 to Yuma (2007)
- Indiana Jones and the Kingdom of the Crystal Skull (2008)
- Georgia O'Keeffe (2009)
- Year One (2009)
- Brothers (2009)
- Cowboys & Aliens (2011)
- Lone Ranger (2013)
- Cosmos: A Spacetime Odyssey (2014)
- The Ballad of Buster Scruggs (2018)
- Oppenheimer (2023)

== See also ==
- Effigia
