= Ahvaytum =

Ahvaytum Temporal range: Late Triassic (Carnian), ~230 Ma
- Skeletal reconstruction

Scientific classification
- Kingdom: Animalia
- Phylum: Chordata
- Class: Reptilia
- Clade: Dinosauria
- Clade: Saurischia
- Clade: †Sauropodomorpha (?)
- Genus: †Ahvaytum; Lovelace et al., 2025
- Species: †A. bahndooiveche

Binomial name
- †Ahvaytum bahndooiveche Lovelace et al., 2025

Genus of early sauropodomorph dinosaurs

Ahvaytum (/ɑːˈveɪtəm/ ah-VAY-tum; lit. 'long ago') is an extinct genus of probable basal sauropodomorph saurischian dinosaurs from the Late Triassic Popo Agie Formation of Wyoming, United States. The genus contains a single species, A. bahndooiveche, known from fragmentary hindlimb bones. Ahvaytum represents the oldest known named dinosaur of the ancient Laurasian landmass.

== Discovery and naming ==
The Ahvaytum fossil material was discovered in 2013 in outcrops of the lower Popo Agie Formation (Garrett's Surprise locality) in west-central Wyoming, United States. The holotype specimen, UWGM 1975, is an isolated left astragalus. Specimen UWGM 7549, a partial left femur (proximal end) was referred to Ahvaytum since it was found within a 5 metres (16 ft) radius of the holotype and its anatomy is consistent with saurischians.

Prior to the formal naming of Ahvaytum, the fossil material was noted in a 2020 conference abstract, where it was initially interpreted as an early-diverging theropod closely related to the Neotheropoda.

In 2025, Lovelace et al. described Ahvaytum bahndooiveche as a new genus and species of early sauropodomorphs based on these fossil remains. The generic name, Ahvaytum (Shoshoni pronunciation: [ɑβɑjttum]), means "long ago", referring to the specimen's old age. The specific name, bahndooiveche (Shoshoni pronunciation: [pɑnduiβitʃi̥]), literally translates to "water's young man", and is the term used to refer to both dinosaurs and the colorful native salamanders. The full binomial (intended to mean "long ago dinosaur") was created by Eastern Shoshone elders and students in their native language, intended to counteract the perceived colonialism associated with the erection of names derived from European languages.

Ahvaytum notably represents the oldest dinosaur from the ancient landmass of Laurasia (comprising what is now North America, Europe, and Asia excluding the Indian subcontinent and the Arabian peninsula). Prior to its description, it was assumed that sauropodomorph dinosaurs originated in the landmass of Gondwana, although Ahvaytum shows that this clade had already dispersed more widely.

== Description ==
Size compared to a human

Ahvaytum is a small sauropodomorph, estimated to be around a metre (3 feet) long and 30 centimetres (1 foot) tall. Eoraptor, a close relative from Argentina, is known from a larger and more complete skeleton with a total body length of around 1.3 metres (4.3 ft). The fossil material assigned to Ahvaytum is interpreted as belonging to at least one individual that had grown past the juvenile ontogenetic stage and was still slowly growing.

== Classification ==
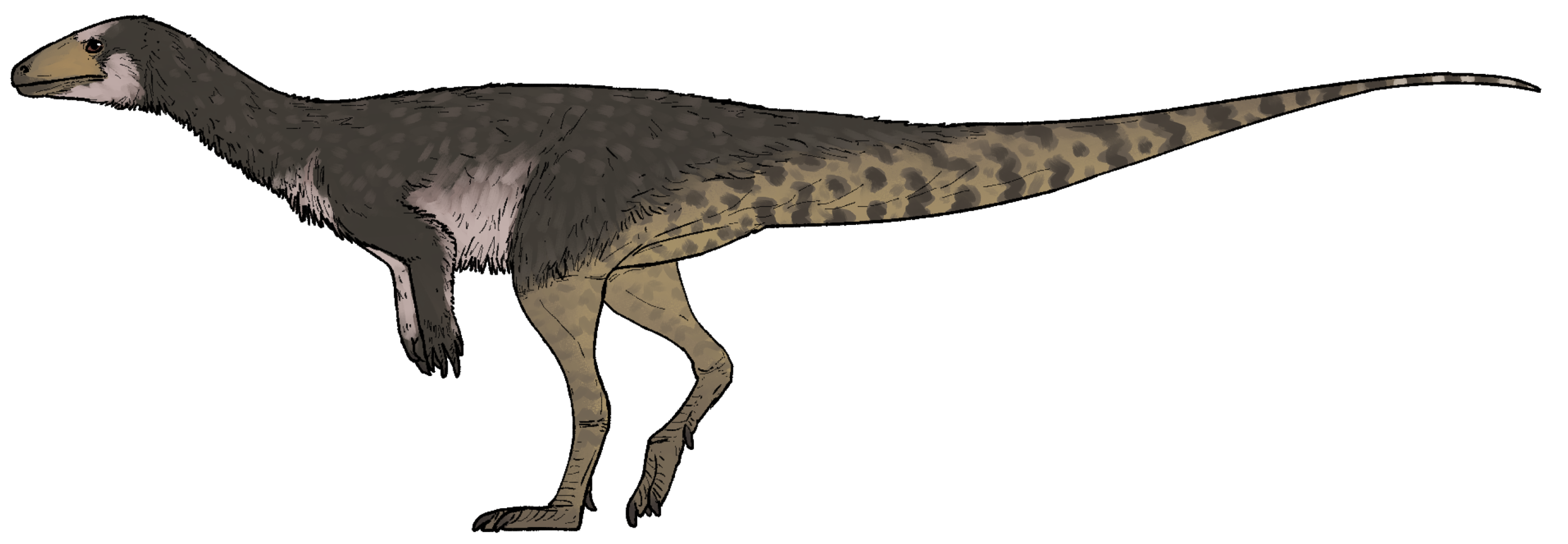
Speculative life restoration

In their phylogenetic analyses, Lovelace et al. (2025) consistently recovered Ahvaytum as closely affiliated with the Gondwanan sauropodomorphs Eoraptor and Buriolestes. Using maximum parsimony, their analysis placed these taxa, along with the African Mbiresaurus, as members of the family Saturnaliidae. The authors noted that these results, displayed in the cladogram below, indicate a more inclusive grouping of saturnaliids than traditionally recognized:

- Eusaurischia
  - Theropoda
  - Sauropodomorpha
    - - Panphagia
      - Pampadromaeus
    - Bagualosauria
      - - Bagualosaurus
        - Saturnaliidae
          - - Saturnalia
            - Nhandumirim
            - Chromogisaurus
          - - Ahvaytum
            - - Mbiresaurus
              - - Buriolestes
                - Eoraptor
      - - Thecodontosaurus
        - - Plateosauria

== Paleoenvironment ==
In 2024, Deckman, Lovelace, and Holland suggested that the Popo Agie Formation represents a common river environment, specifically a distributive fluvial system. The formation's lower unit from which Ahvaytum is known has also yielded fossils of sulcimentisaurian 'silesaurids', the large temnospondyls Anaschisma and Buettnererpeton and the phytosaur Parasuchus. The rhynchosaur Beesiiwo, the pseudosuchians Heptasuchus and Poposaurus, and the dicynodont Eubrachiosaurus are known from other layers of this formation.
