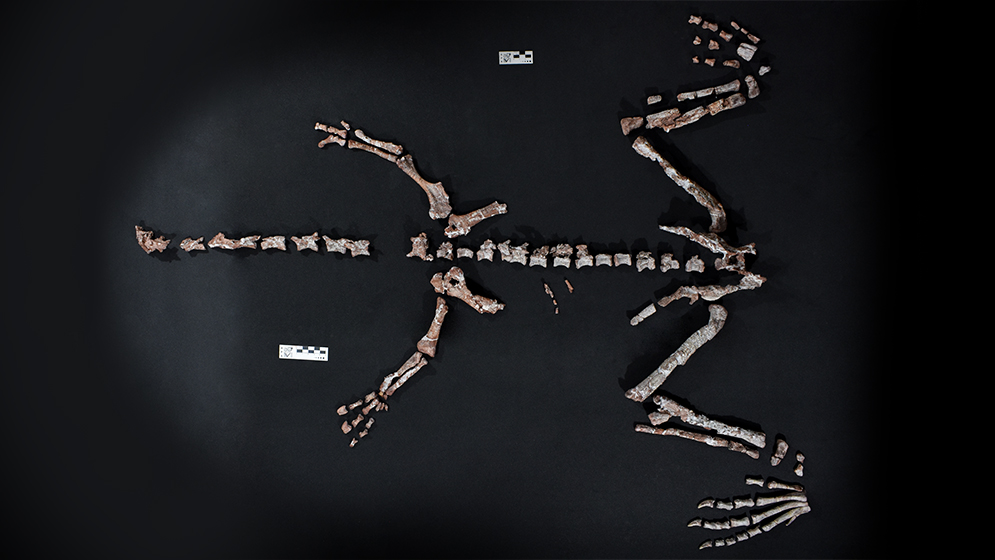
- Holotype specimen
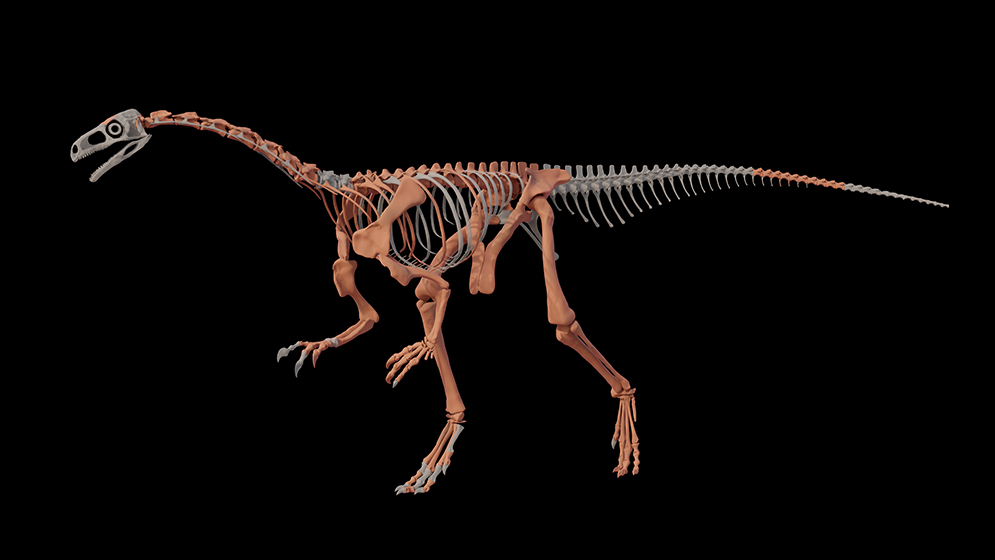
- Reconstructed skeleton (known remains in orange)

Scientific classification
- Kingdom: Animalia
- Phylum: Chordata
- Class: Reptilia
- Clade: Dinosauria
- Clade: Saurischia
- Clade: †Sauropodomorpha
- Clade: †Bagualosauria
- Genus: †Huayracursor; Hechenleitner et al., 2025
- Species: †H. jaguensis

Binomial name
- †Huayracursor jaguensis Hechenleitner et al., 2025

= Huayracursor =

Huayracursor Temporal range: Late Triassic, late Carnian

Genus of sauropodomorph dinosaurs

Huayracursor (lit. 'wind runner') is an extinct genus of early sauropodomorph dinosaurs known from the Late Triassic (Carnian age) Santo Domingo Formation of Argentina. The genus contains a single species, Huayracursor jaguensis, known from a partial articulated skeleton.

== Discovery and naming ==
The Huayracursor holotype specimen, CRILAR-Pv 151, was discovered in outcrops of the Santo Domingo Formation near Vinchina in La Rioja Province, Argentina. The specimen consists of a nearly complete skeleton, including cranial remains, found in articulation.

In 2025, Hechenleitner and colleagues described Huayracursor jaguensis as a new genus and species of sauropodomorph dinosaur based on these fossil remains. The generic name, Huayracursor, Quechua word huayra, meaning "wind", with the Latin word cursor, meaning "runner". The specific name, jaguensis, references the Jagüé village.

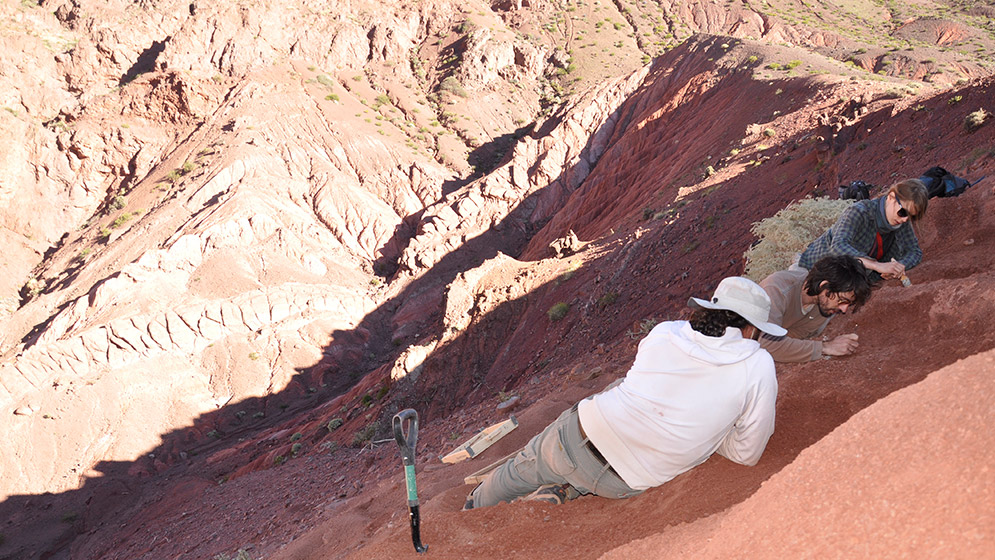
Excavation of the holotype in 2018

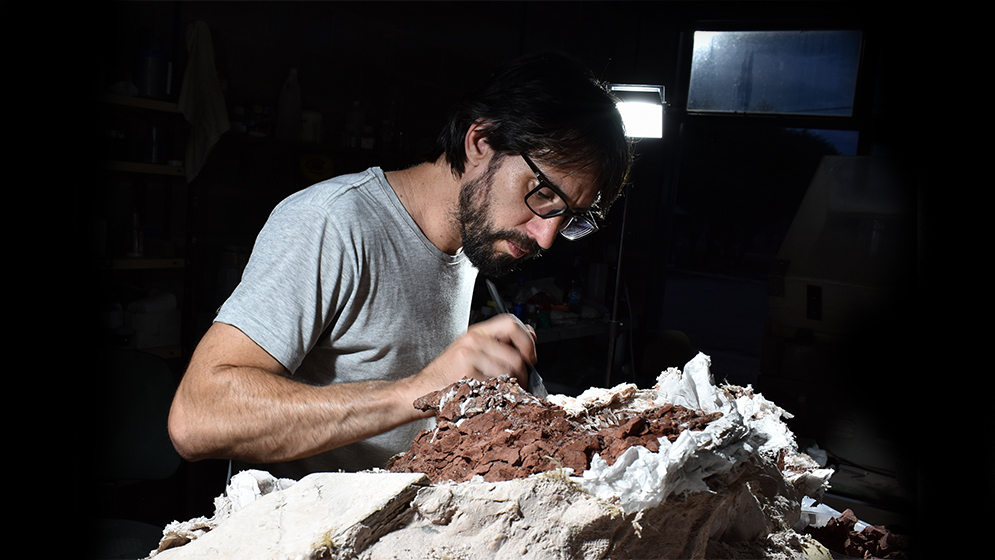
Preparation of the holotype by Martín Hechenleitner

== Classification ==
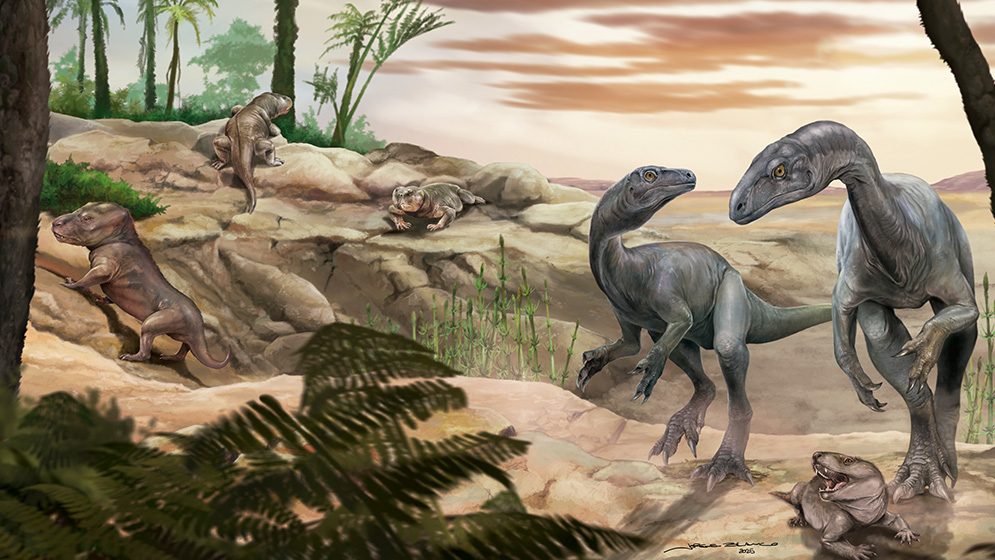
Paleoenvironmental reconstruction of Huayracursor and coeval animals of the Santo Domingo fauna

In their 2025 phylogenetic analysis, Hechenleitner and colleagues recovered Huayracursor as an early-diverging member of the Sauropodomorpha. Their results placed Huayracursor, as the sister taxon to Bagualosaurus, as the earliest branch of the more inclusive clade Bagualosauria. These results are displayed in the cladogram below:

- Sauropodomorpha
  - Buriolestes
  - - Eoraptor
    - - - Pampadromaeus
        - Panphagia
      - - - Chromogisaurus
          - Saturnalia
        - - Nhandumirim
          - - Guaibasaurus
            - Bagualosauria
              - - Huayracursor
                - Bagualosaurus
              - - Nambalia
                - - - Pantydraco
                    - Thecodontosaurus
                  - - other post-Carnian sauropodomorphs
