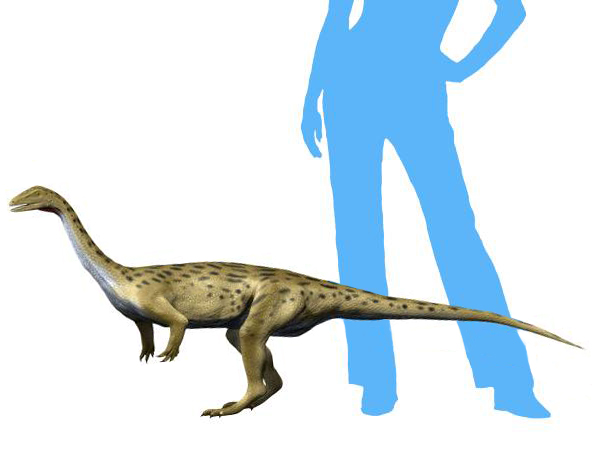
- Life restoration of Saturnalia tupiniquim

Scientific classification
- Kingdom: Animalia
- Phylum: Chordata
- Class: Reptilia
- Clade: Dinosauria
- Clade: Saurischia
- Clade: †Sauropodomorpha
- Family: †Saturnaliidae; Langer et al., 2019

Type species
- †Saturnalia tupiniquim Langer et al., 1999

Genera
- †Chromogisaurus; †Nhandumirim; †Pampadromaeus?; †Panphagia?; †Saturnalia

Synonyms
- Saturnaliinae Ezcurra, 2010

= Saturnaliidae =

Saturnaliids Temporal range: Late Triassic, 233.23–230 Ma

Late Triassic dinosaur clade

Saturnaliidae is a family of basal sauropodomorph dinosaurs found in Brazil, Argentina and possibly Zimbabwe. It is not to be confused with Saturnalidae, a family of radiolarian protists, or with Saturniidae, a family of large moths.

== Classification ==
In 2010, Martin Ezcurra defined the subfamily Saturnaliinae for the clade containing Saturnalia and Chromogisaurus, which were found to be close relatives in several studies. While they are sometimes found to be a subgroup within the Guaibasauridae, all recent studies have found the saturnaliines to form an independent lineage at the very base of the sauropodomorph family tree. At one point, Agnosphitys was recovered as a possible saturnaliine until it was recovered as a member of Silesauridae in 2017. Langer and colleagues (2019) recovered Pampadromaeus and Panphagia as relatives of Saturnalia and Chromogisaurus, elevating Saturnaliinae to family rank as Saturnaliidae. In that particular paper, they recovered Guaibasaurus as a basal theropod.

Additionally, Eoraptor, Buriolestes, Bagualosaurus and especially Nhandumirim are also possible members of this clade following their position in many recent phylogenetic analyses and the new definition given by Langer et al. (2019), as "the maximal sauropodomorph clade to encompass Saturnalia but not Plateosaurus." In several of these analyses, Guaibasaurus is recovered as distantly related to Saturnalia, sometimes as a more basal sauropodomorph or saurischian, and in some cases specifically related to more derived taxa such as Macrocollum and Unaysaurus. This way a Guaibasauridae including Saturnalia and kin is no longer being supported.
