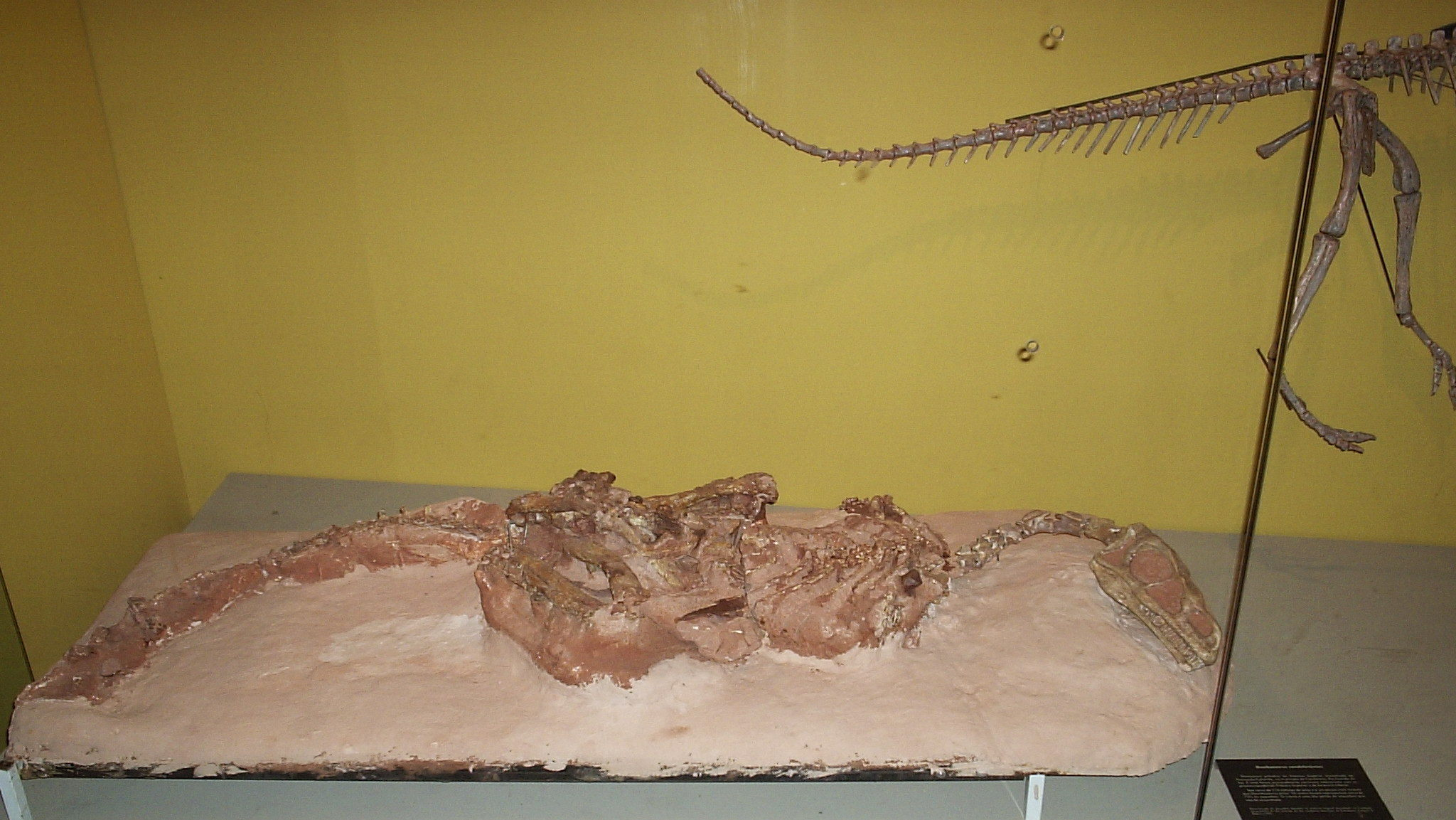
- Fossil skeleton of Guaibasaurus candelariensis

Scientific classification
- Kingdom: Animalia
- Phylum: Chordata
- Class: Reptilia
- Clade: Dinosauria
- Clade: Saurischia
- Clade: †Sauropodomorpha
- Family: †Guaibasauridae; Bonaparte et al., 1999

Type species
- †Guaibasaurus candelariensis Bonaparte et al., 1999

Subgroups
- †Guaibasaurus; †Macrocollum?; †Unaysaurus?

= Guaibasauridae =

Guaibasaurids Temporal range: Late Triassic, 225.42–225 Ma

Extinct family of dinosaurs

Guaibasauridae is a family of basal sauropodomorph dinosaurs, known from fossil remains of late Triassic period formations in Brazil, Argentina and India.

== Classification ==
The exact makeup and classification of the Guaibasauridae remain uncertain. The family was originally named by Jose Bonaparte and colleagues in 1999 to contain a single genus and species, Guaibasaurus candelariensis. When the second specimen of Guaibasaurus was described from better remains in 2007, it became easier to compare it to other enigmatic early saurischians, which are often difficult to classify because they combine characteristics of the two major saurischian groups, Theropoda and Sauropodomorpha. Bonaparte and colleagues, in light of the information gained from this second specimen, found that the genus Saturnalia (which is anatomically very similar to Guaibasaurus) could also be assigned to the Guaibasauridae, though they did not conduct a phylogenetic analysis or define Guaibasauridae as a clade. The researchers also tentatively assigned the poorly understood genus Agnosphitys to this family. However, the latter assignment was not supported by the results of the phylogenetic analyses of early dinosaurs that were carried out by Baron, Norman & Barrett (2017).

Bonaparte and colleagues (2007) found that guaibasaurids have more characteristics in common with theropods than they do with early sauropodomorphs (or "prosauropods"). Because of this, according to Bonaparte, they are most likely either a very basal group on the stem leading toward sauropodomorphs or a group ancestral to both sauropodomorphs and theropods. Furthermore, the authors interpret this as evidence that the common ancestor of both saurischian lineages was more theropod-like than prosauropod-like.

Ezcurra (2010) defined the subfamily Saturnaliinae for the clade containing Saturnalia and Chromogisaurus, which were found to be close relatives in several studies. While they are sometimes found to be a subgroup of guaibasaurids, other studies have found the saturnaliines to form an independent lineage at the very base of the sauropodomorph family tree. Langer and colleagues (2019) recovered Pampadromaeus and Panphagia as relatives of Saturnalia and Chromogisaurus, elevating Saturnaliinae to family rank as Saturnaliidae. They recovered Guaibasaurus as a basal theropod. Guaibasaurus has since been recovered as a sauropodomorph, possibly allied with Unaysauridae, with Saturnaliidae representing a group of more basal sauropodomorphs. Among taxa at one point considered guaibasaurids, Agnosphitys has been reassigned to Silesauridae, and Eoraptor, Panphagia, Saturnalia and Chromogisaurus are considered basalmost sauropodomorphs possibly in a clade of their own.
