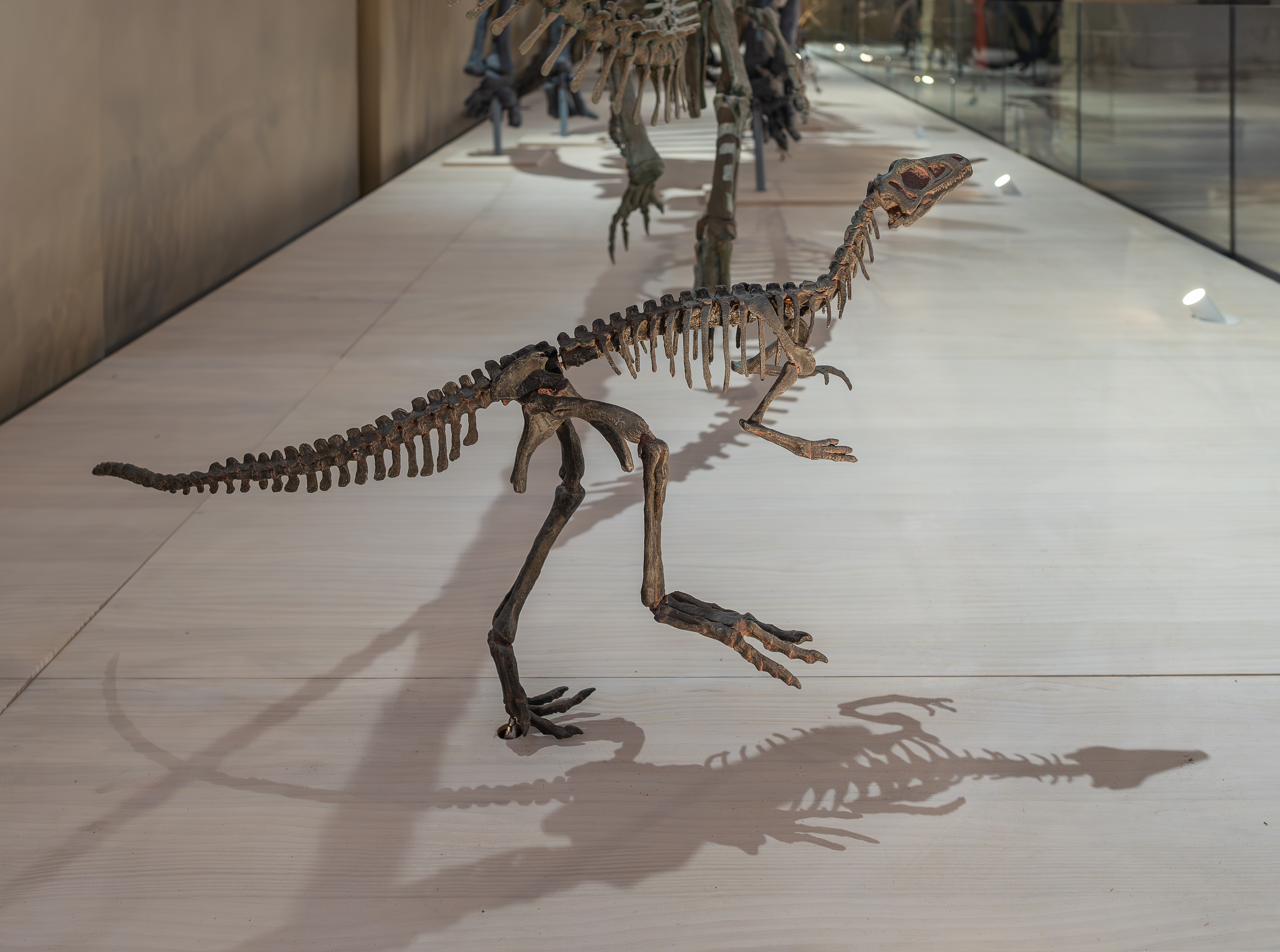
- Reconstructed skeleton, National Museum of Natural History of Chile

Scientific classification
- Kingdom: Animalia
- Phylum: Chordata
- Class: Reptilia
- Clade: Dinosauria
- Clade: Saurischia
- Clade: †Sauropodomorpha
- Genus: †Eoraptor; Sereno et al. 1993
- Species: †E. lunensis

Binomial name
- †Eoraptor lunensis Sereno et al. 1993

= Eoraptor =

Eoraptor Temporal range: Late Triassic (Carnian), 231.4–228.91 Ma

Extinct genus of dinosaurs

Eoraptor (/ˈiːoʊˌræptər/) is a genus of small, lightly built, basal sauropodomorph dinosaur. One of the earliest-known dinosaurs and one of the earliest sauropodomorphs, it lived approximately 231 to 228 million years ago, during the Late Triassic in Western Gondwana, in the region that is now northwestern Argentina. The type and only species, Eoraptor lunensis, was first described in 1993, and is known from an almost complete and well-preserved skeleton and several fragmentary ones. Eoraptor had multiple tooth shapes, which suggests that it was omnivorous.

== History of discovery ==
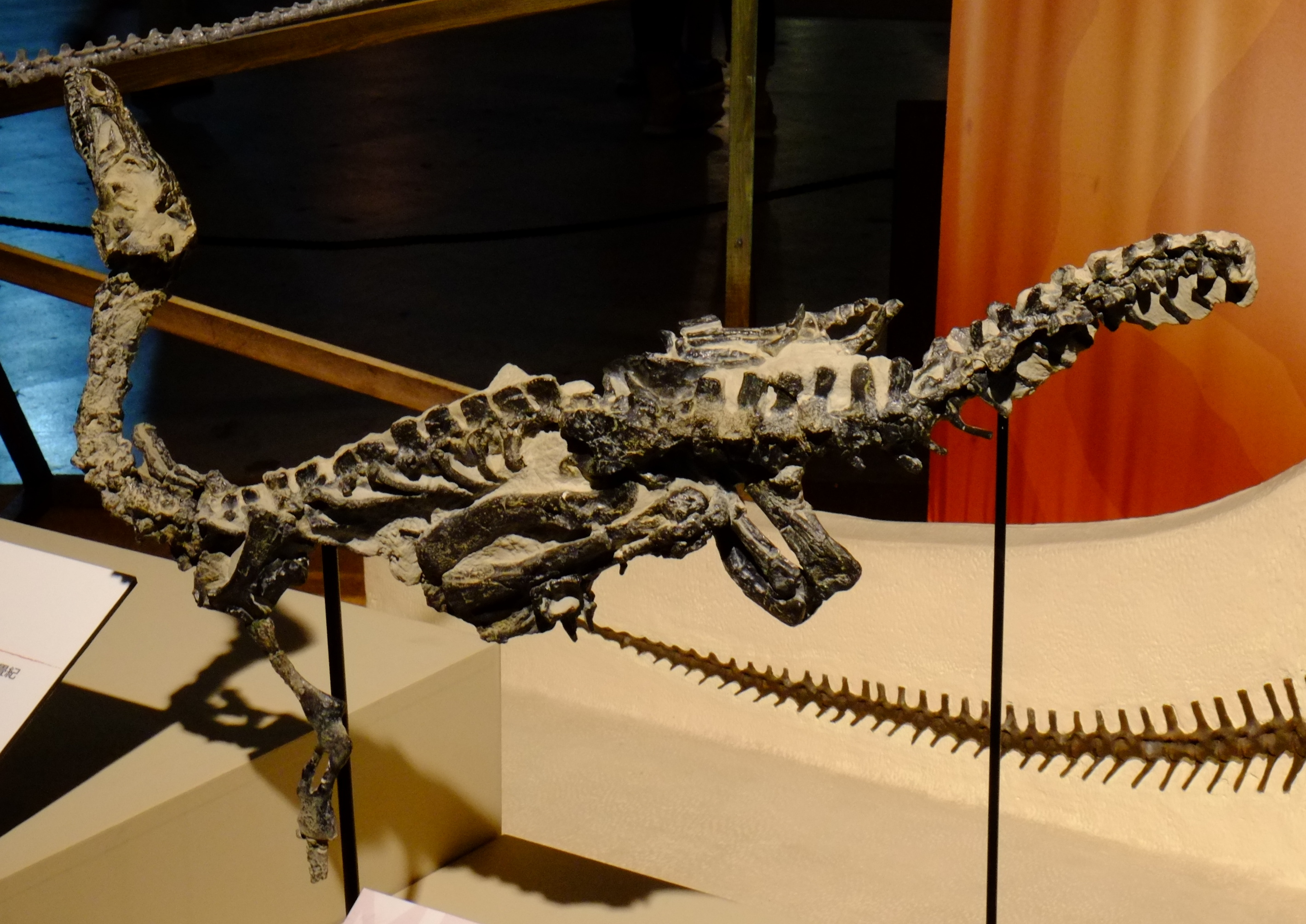
Holotype specimen

The bones of this primitive dinosaur were first discovered in 1991, by University of San Juan paleontologist Ricardo Martínez and Paul Sereno, during field work conducted by the University of Chicago and the University of San Juan. The holotype specimen PVSJ 512 was discovered in muddy siltstone belonging to the Cancha de Bochas Member of the Ischigualasto Formation in Argentina. The fossils in this formation were deposited in the Carnian stage of the Triassic period, approximately 235 to 228 million years ago. It took almost 12 months to collect the holotype, which was then shipped to the Field Museum of Natural History in Chicago for preparation by William F. Simpson and Bob Masek. The fossil was first put on display in Chicago and was then returned to San Juan, Argentina, where it went on display at the Museum of Natural Sciences.

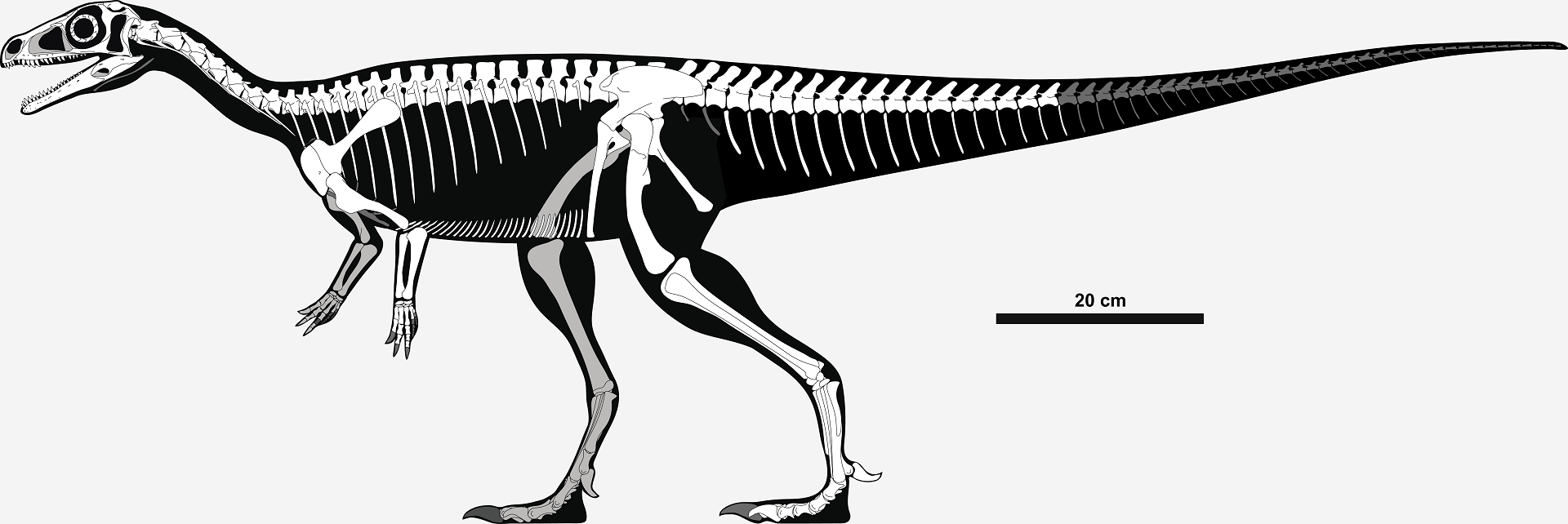
Skeletal diagram, known remains depicted in white and light grey, unknown in dark grey

The genus Eoraptor was described and named by Paul Sereno, Catherine Forster, Raymond R. Rogers, and Alfredo M. Monetta in 1993. The name is derived from the Greek word eós (ἠώς) meaning 'dawn', a reference to its primitive nature, and the Latin word raptor meaning 'plunderer', a reference to its presumed carnivorous nature and its grasping hand. The specific name lunensis is derived from the Latin words luna ('moon') and the suffix -ensis ('inhabitant'), a reference to its place of discovery: the Valle de la Luna ('Valley of the Moon'), so named for its arid, otherworldly appearance evocative of a lunar landscape. The type species Eoraptor lunensis means 'dawn plunderer from the Valley of the Moon'.

== Description ==
Eoraptor compared in size to a human

Eoraptor was a small dinosaur, with the known specimens measuring 1.2–1.3 m (3.9–4.3 ft) in length, and weighing around or less than 10 kg (22 lb). It had a lightly built skull with a slightly enlarged external naris. As in early sauropodomorphs such as Buriolestes and Pampadromaeus and coelophysoids (which would appear millions of years later), Eoraptor had a kink in its upper jaws, between the maxilla and the premaxilla. Paul Sereno et al. (2013) observed that the lower jaw had a mid-mandibular joint. It ran digitigrade, and upright on its hind legs. The femur of the holotype specimen PVSJ 512 is 152 millimetres (6.0 in), and the tibia is 157 millimetres (6.2 in), suggesting that it was a fast runner. Its forelimbs are only half the length of its hindlimbs, suggesting that it was bipedal. All of its long bones have hollow shafts. Eoraptor had five digits on each 'hand', the three longest of which ended in large claws and were presumably used to handle prey. Scientists have surmised that the fourth and fifth digits were too tiny to be of any use in hunting. The ilium is supported by three sacral vertebrae (atypical of the plesiomorphic two sacrals of basal sauropodomorphs), unlike that of the coeval Herrerasaurus which is supported by only two sacrals, a basal trait. Eoraptor had vertebral centra that are hollow, a feature present in some of its ancestors.

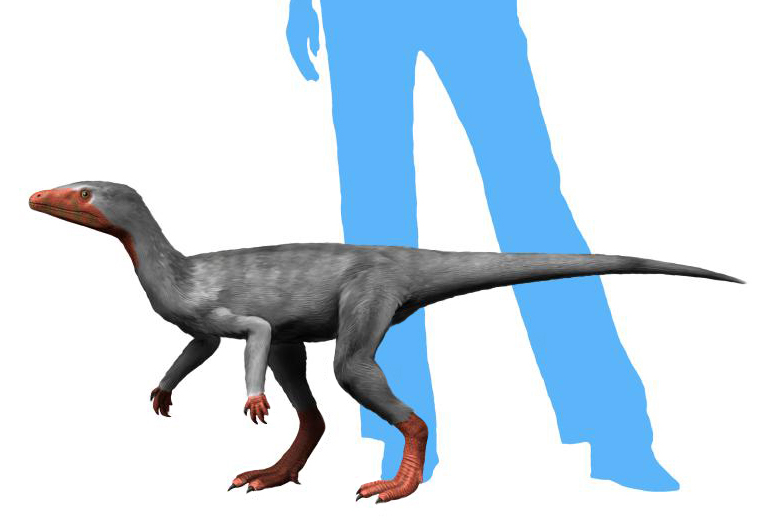
Restoration

The original describers, Paul Sereno et al. (1993), supported the notion that Eoraptor was an adult specimen based on the closure of sutures in the vertebral column, and the partial fusion of the scapulocoracoid. Bonaparte (1996) interpreted the relatively large orbital opening in the skull as a juvenile trait. Ronald Tykoski agreed (2005) and suggested that certain skull features of the type specimen suggested that it was young, specifically, the skull bones are not completely fused, relatively large orbits, and a short snout. Later Sereno et al. (2013) considered the type specimen as a young adult approaching skeletal maturity, considering that it contained traits of both maturity and immaturity.

According to Sereno et al. (1993), Eoraptor can be distinguished based on the fact that its premaxillary and anterior maxillary teeth are leaf-shaped, the external nares are slightly enlarged, and the premaxilla is observed to have a slender posterolateral process. Max Langer and Michael Benton (2006) noted that Eoraptor can be distinguished based on the fact that the proximal part of its fibula is extremely transversely compressed.

== Classification ==
In 1993 Paul Sereno and his colleagues described and named Eoraptor, and determined it to be one of the earliest dinosaurs. Its age was determined by several factors, not least because it lacked the specialized features of any of the major groups of later dinosaurs, including its lack of specialized predatory features. In 1995, Sereno posited that Eoraptor is the earliest-recorded theropod, and is closest to "the hypothetical dinosaurian condition than any other dinosaurian subgroup." The precise placement of Eoraptor within Dinosauria has been unstable, with opinion often varying between a basal saurischian and a basal theropod. When it was first described by Sereno and Forster in 1993, it was regarded as a theropod, based on its "functionally tridactyl hand" and other anatomical features. In 2011, a study conducted by Hans-Dieter Sues, Sterling J. Nesbitt, David S. Berman and Amy C. Henrici featuring a description of Daemonosaurus, also concluded that there is now enough fossil evidence to confidently classify Eoraptor as a theropod. The study noted that the "transitional suite of character states" of the recently discovered dinosaurs, Daemonosaurus and Tawa further support that Eoraptor is a basal theropod, and not a basal saurischian or a basal sauropodomorph. On the other hand, several studies from 2012 onward have recovered Eoraptor as an early sauropodomorph, rather than a theropod. The following phylogenetic tree illustrates the relationships of Eoraptor among the major theropod groups based on various studies conducted in the 2010s.

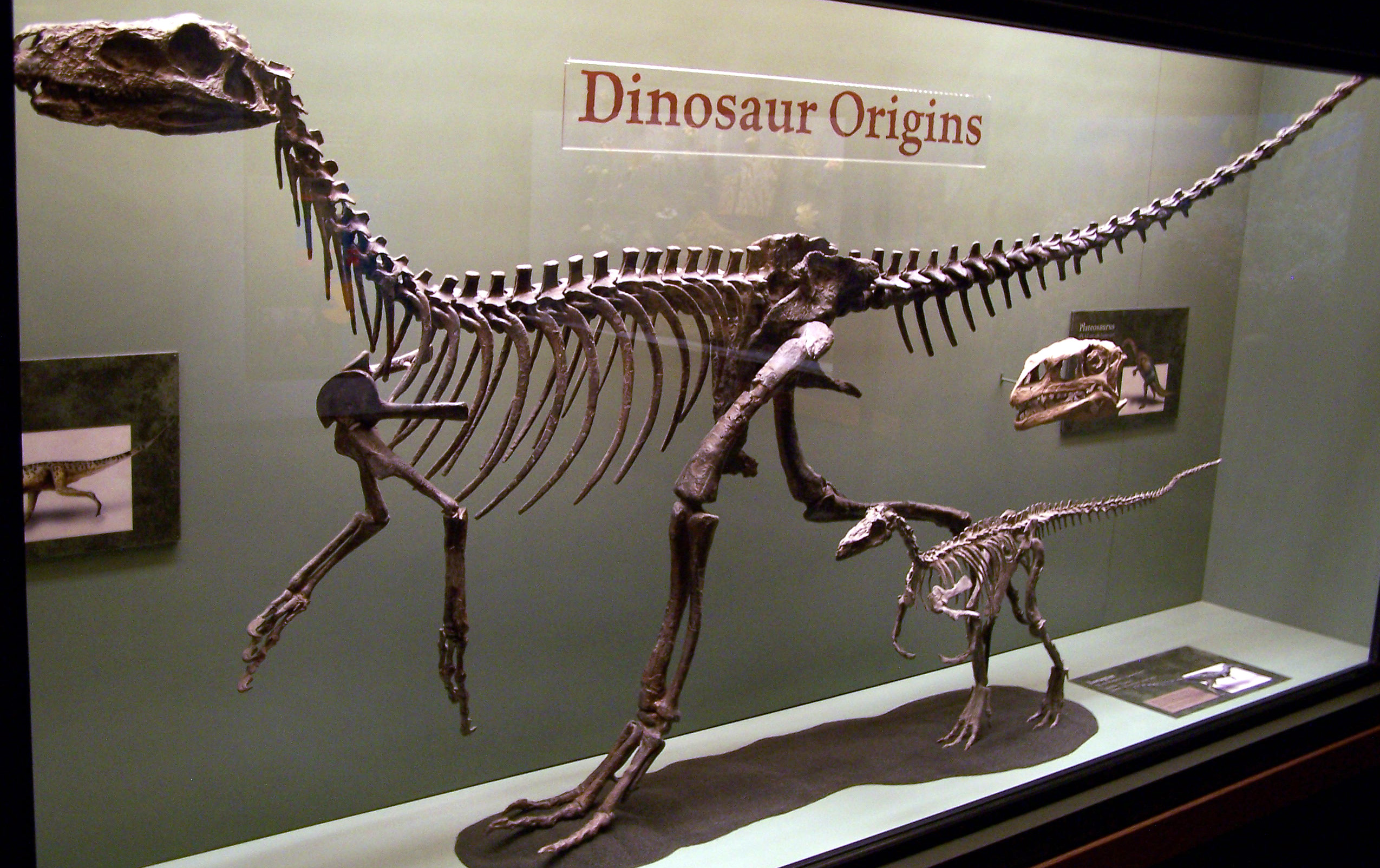
Herrerasaurus (large), Eoraptor (small), and Plateosaurus (skull), three early saurischians

- Theropoda
  - †Herrerasauridae
  - - †Eoraptor
    - - †Eodromaeus
      - - †Daemonosaurus
        - - †Tawa
          - Neotheropoda
            - †Coelophysoidea
            - - †Dilophosauridae
              - Averostra
                - †Ceratosauria
                - Tetanurae

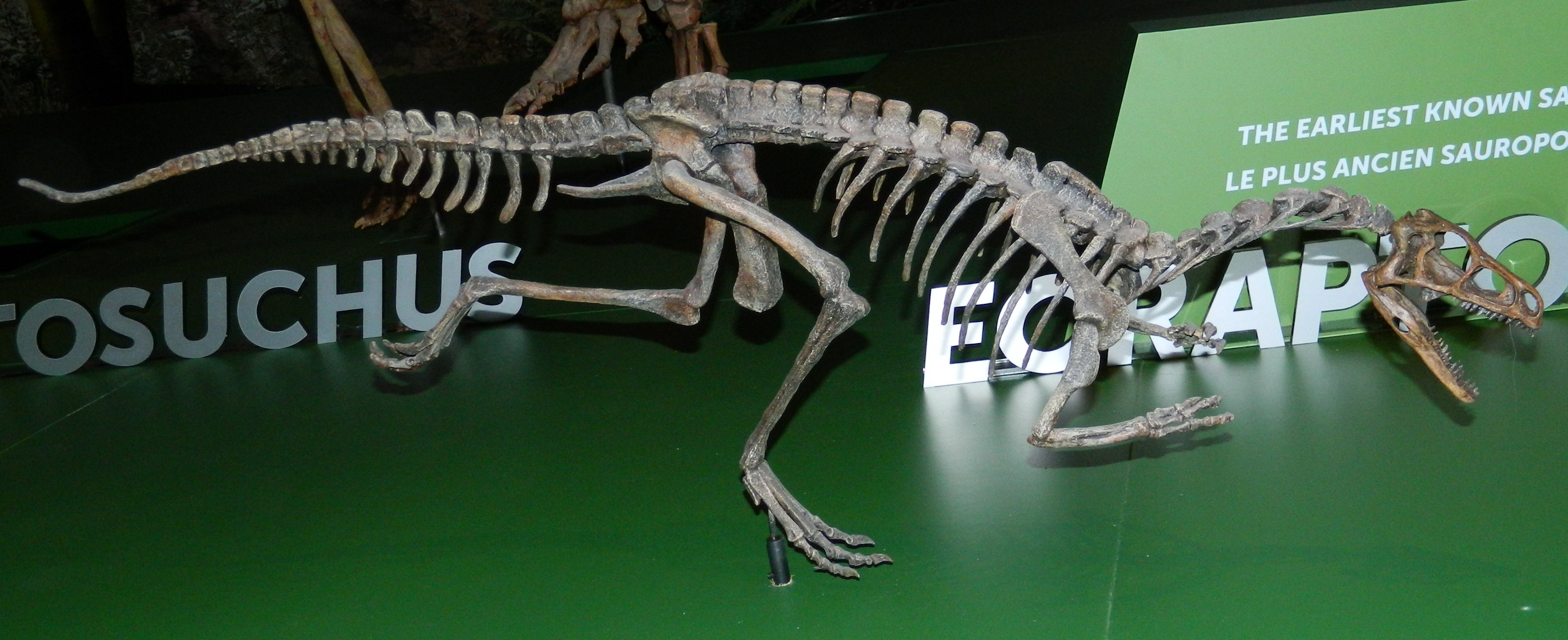
Reconstructed skeleton, Royal Ontario Museum

Philip Currie (1997) found Eoraptor anatomically closer to what would be considered the ancestral morphotype of both saurischian and ornithischian dinosaurs. In 2011, Martinez et al. (the team that described Eodromaeus) found Eoraptor to be a basal sauropodomorph, with characteristic features from the group. Michael Benton expressed his hesitation to this, and claimed that it is "quite a shift" to remove Eoraptor from Theropoda and then place it in Sauropodomorpha. A subsequent study by Apaldetti, Martinez, Alcober, and Pol published in 2011 found Eoraptor to be a saurischian close to sauropodomorphs and theropods, though was unable to resolve which of the two branches, if either, it fell within. Sereno et al. (2013) redescribed the holotype skeleton and concluded that Eoraptor was not a theropod but a basal sauropodomorph, consistent with the earlier observation made by Martinez et al. (2011).

A large phylogenetic analysis of early dinosaurs by Matthew Baron, David Norman and Paul Barrett (2017) found Eoraptor to be the earliest diverging member of Theropoda, within the larger clade Ornithoscelida. A phylogenetic analysis published with the description of new Buriolestes remains in 2018, based on Langer et al. (2017) placed Eoraptor in a clade of early sauropodomorphs, alongside Buriolestes, Panphagia, Pampadromaeus, and Saturnalia. In their 2025 description of the early bagualosaurian sauropodomorph Huayracursor, Hechenleitner and colleagues recovered Eoraptor as one of the earliest-diverging members of the Sauropodomorpha, diverging after Buriolestes but before all other members of this clade. These results are displayed in the cladogram below:

- Sauropodomorpha
  - Buriolestes
  - - Eoraptor
    - - - Pampadromaeus
        - Panphagia
      - - - Chromogisaurus
          - Saturnalia
        - - Nhandumirim
          - - Guaibasaurus
            - Bagualosauria
              - - Huayracursor
                - Bagualosaurus
              - - Nambalia
                - - - Pantydraco
                    - Thecodontosaurus
                  - - other post-Carnian sauropodomorphs

== Paleobiology ==
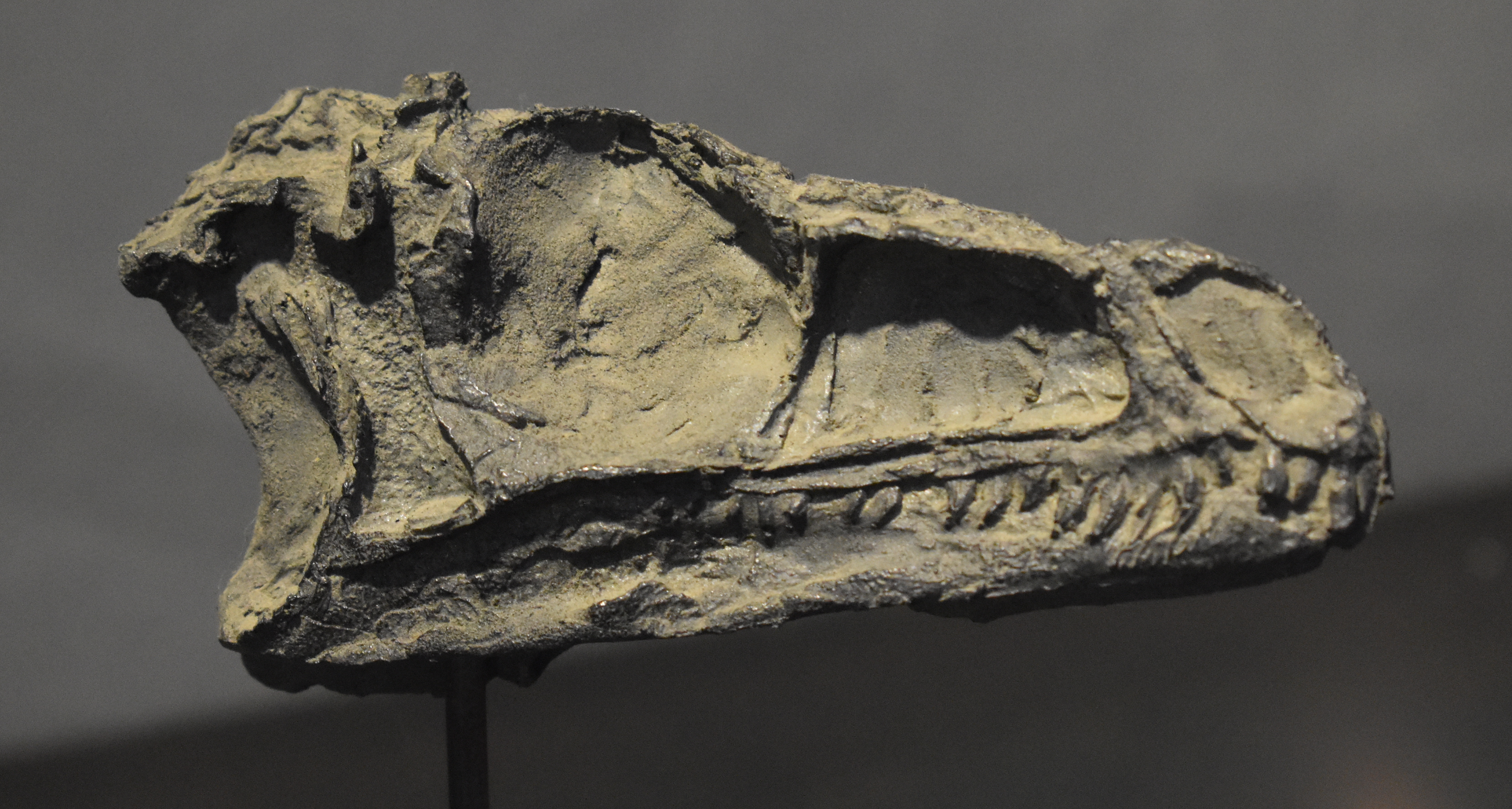
Skull cast

Eoraptor is thought to have been an omnivore, although its dentition is quite similar to that of Buriolestes, which is considered carnivorous. It was a swift sprinter and, upon catching its prey, it would use claws and teeth to tear the prey apart. Unlike later carnivorous dinosaurs, it lacked a sliding joint at the articulation of the lower jaw, with which to hold large prey. Furthermore, only some of its teeth were curved and saw-edged, unlike those in the mouths of later theropods. The heterodont dentition of Eoraptor consists of both serrated, recurved teeth in the upper jaw, like the teeth of theropods, and leaf-shaped teeth in the lower jaw, like the teeth of basal sauropodomorphs. Eoraptor had 4 teeth in the premaxilla and 18 teeth in the maxilla, a dental formula not dissimilar to that of Herrerasaurus.

== Paleoecology ==
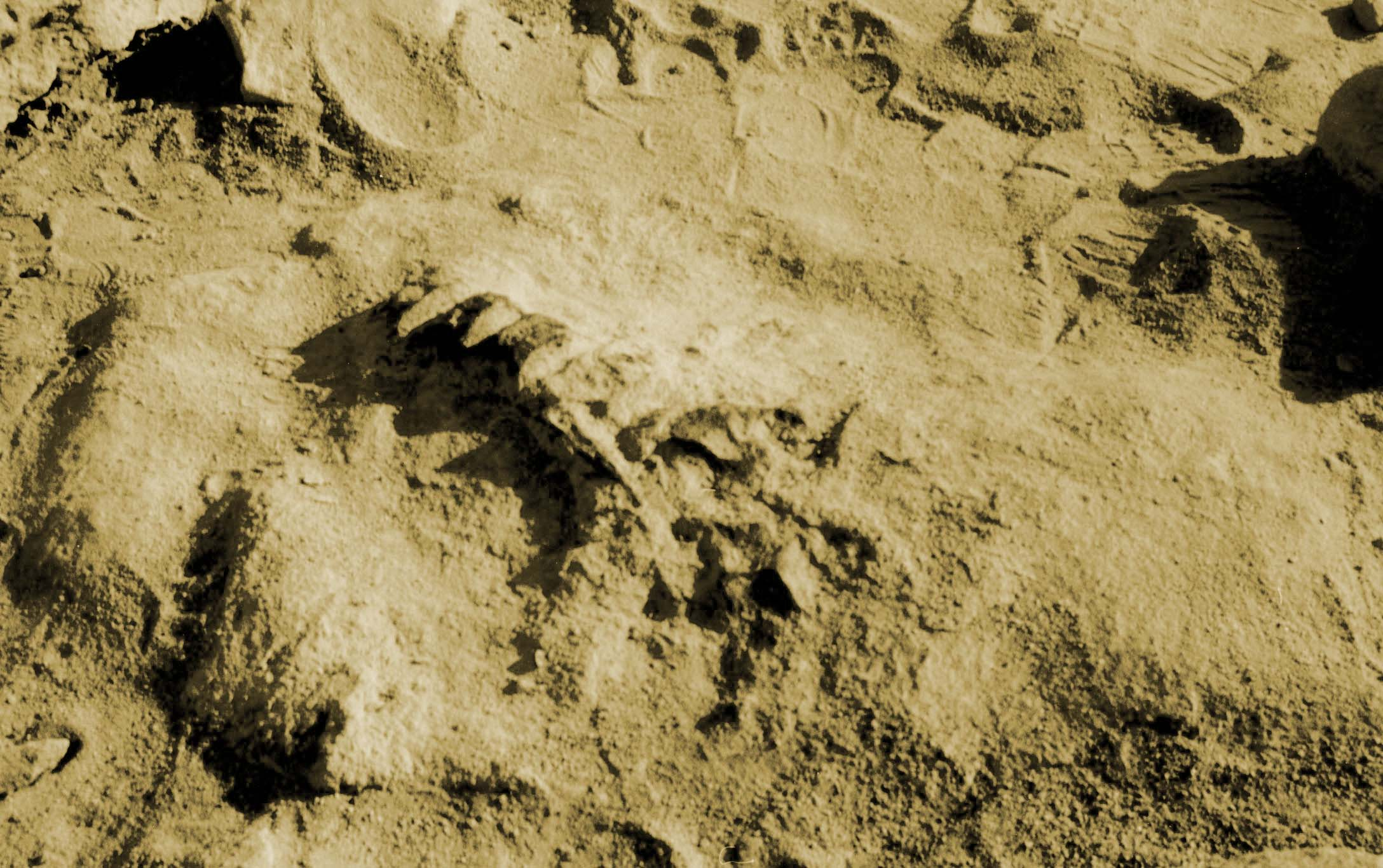
Backbone and upper limbs outcropping from the soil, Valle de la Luna, Argentina

During the Late Triassic period, the Ischigualasto Formation was a volcanically active floodplain covered by forests, with a warm and humid climate, but subject to seasonal variations including strong rainfall. Vegetation consisted of ferns, horsetails, and giant conifers, which formed highland forests along the banks of rivers. Herrerasaurus remains appear to have been the most common among the carnivores of the Ischigualasto Formation. Sereno (1993) noted that Eoraptor was found in "close association" with therapsids, rauisuchians, archosaurs, Saurosuchus and the dinosaurs Herrerasaurus and Pisanosaurus, all of whom lived in its paleoenvironment. Herbivores were represented by rhynchosaurs such as Hyperodapedon; aetosaurs; cynodonts like Chiniquodon, kannemeyeriid dicynodonts such as Ischigualastia; and traversodontids such as Exaeretodon. These non-dinosaurian herbivores were much more abundant than early dinosaurs. Dinosaur fossils, including those of Eoraptor only represent approximately 6% of the total sample that has been recovered from the Ischigualasto Formation (Rogers et al., 1993), which suggests that dinosaurs were less numerous than other tetrapods.
