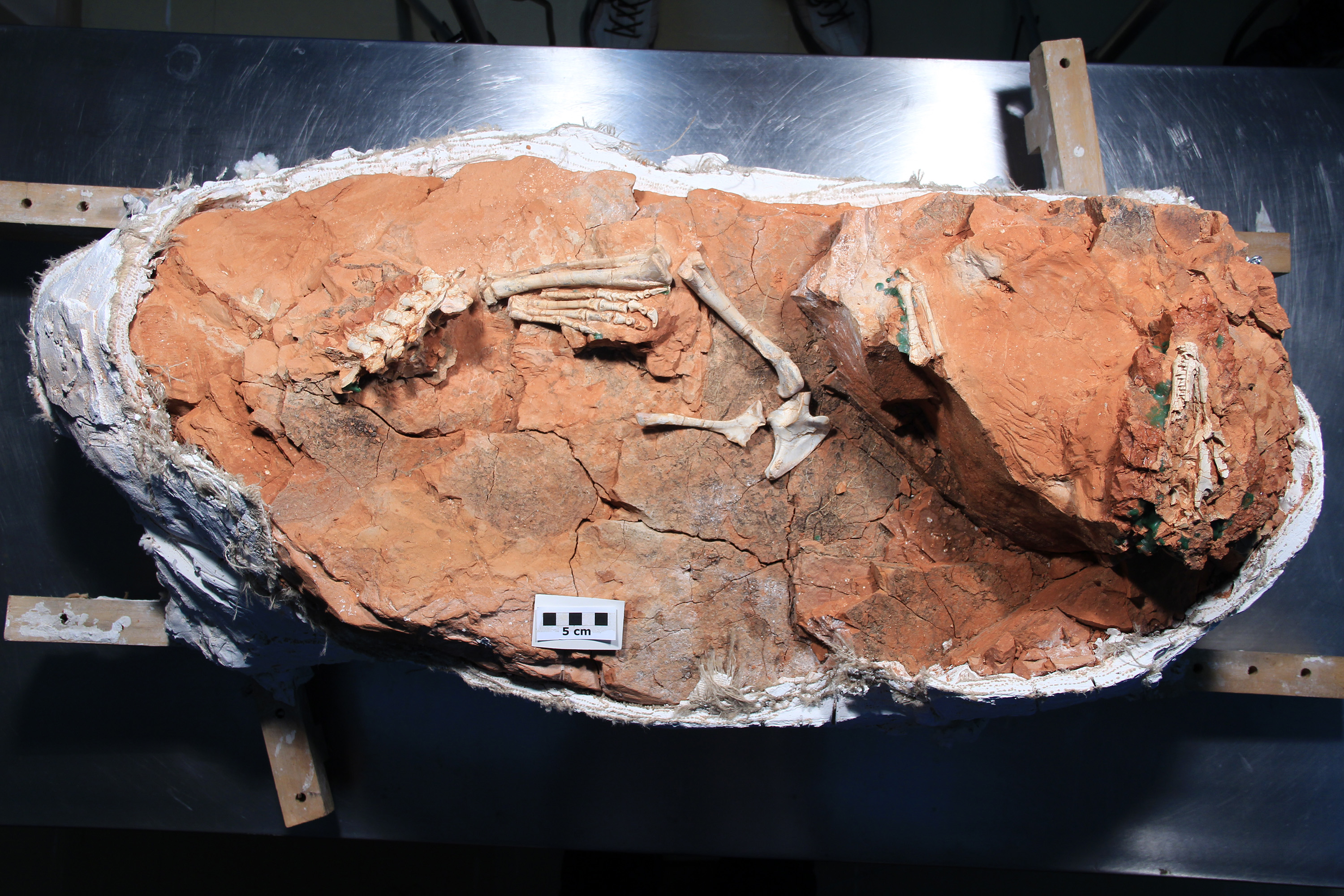
- Block containing the holotype fossil

Scientific classification
- Kingdom: Animalia
- Phylum: Chordata
- Class: Reptilia
- Clade: Dinosauria
- Clade: Saurischia
- Clade: †Sauropodomorpha
- Genus: †Buriolestes; Cabreira et al. 2016
- Species: †B. schultzi

Binomial name
- †Buriolestes schultzi Cabreira et al. 2016

= Buriolestes =

Buriolestes Temporal range: Late Triassic (Carnian) ~233 Ma

Extinct genus of dinosaurs

Buriolestes is a genus of early sauropodomorph dinosaurs from the Late Triassic Santa Maria Formation of the Paraná Basin in southern Brazil. It contains a single species, B. schultzi, named in 2016. The type specimen was found alongside a specimen of the lagerpetid pterosauromorph Ixalerpeton.

== Discovery and naming ==
The holotype specimen, ULBRA-PVT280, was discovered in 2009 in the Buriol ravine in São João do Polêsine, Brazil. These rocks are part of the Santa Maria Formation, which dates to the Carnian epoch. The specimen consists of a single skeleton preserving parts of the skull, vertebrae, left forelimb, and left hindlimb. Another set of smaller bones is also present, which may belong to a juvenile or a different taxon altogether. Two individuals of Ixalerpeton were also preserved close by.

Additional remains were discovered in 2015 and published in 2018. These include a mostly complete skeleton, CAPPA/UFSM 0035, which preserves a complete skull and most bones apart from tail vertebrae. Additional dinosaur bones from the Buriol locality may also belong to Buriolestes, but their assignment is uncertain. They include a femur (ULBRA-PVT289), a portion of an individual's hip and hindlimbs (ULBRA-PVT056), and a lone axis vertebra (CAPPA/UFSM 0179). These new finds have made Buriolestes among the most complete Triassic dinosaurs known, comparable to Eoraptor, Herrerasaurus, and Coelophysis.

In 2016, the holotype specimen was described and given the generic name Buriolestes, after the Buriol family; the suffix -lestes is Greek for "robber." The specific name honors palaeontologist Cezar Schultz. The well-preserved additional specimens were described in 2018, with the braincase of CAPPA/UFSM 0035 being described in more detail in 2020.

== Description ==
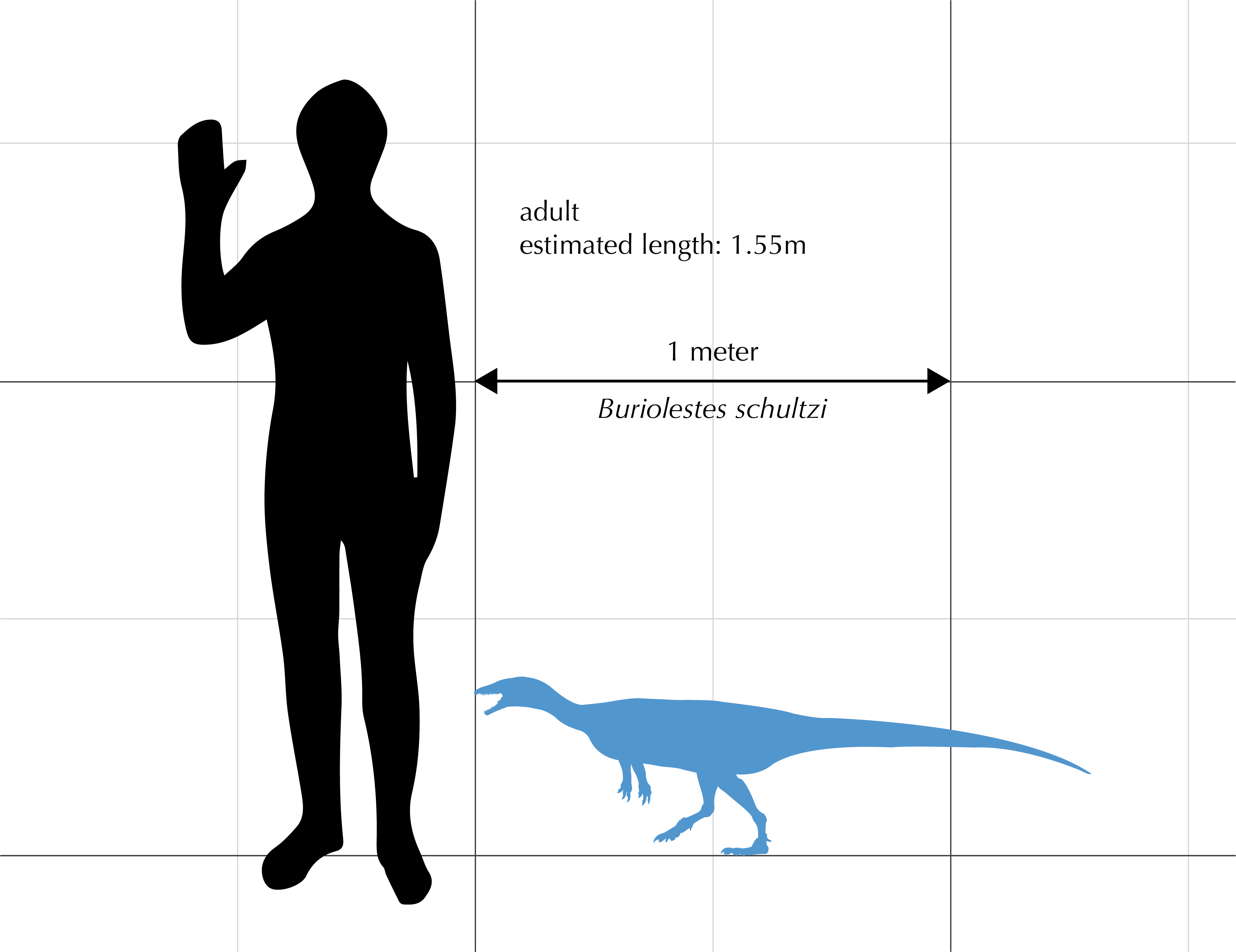
A size comparison between an average human male and a Buriolestes schultzi specimen

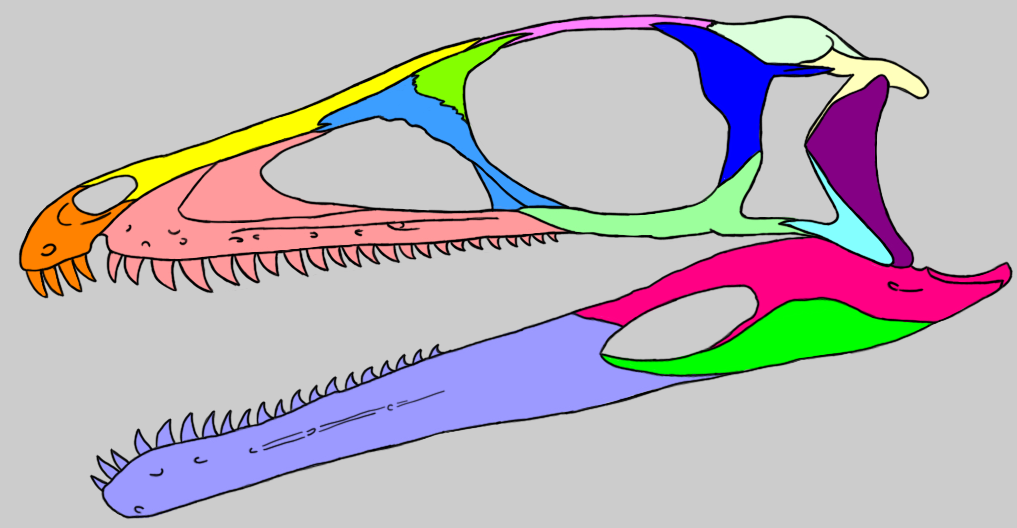
Skull diagram

Although Buriolestes superficially resembles predatory theropod dinosaurs, with jaws lined by finely serrated and slightly curved teeth well-adapted to a carnivorous diet, possibly preying on small vertebrates and soft invertebrates, it is in fact an early member of the otherwise-herbivorous Sauropodomorpha, the group that gave rise to the giant sauropods. Characteristically sauropodomorph traits seen in Buriolestes include a downturned jaw tip and a long deltopectoral crest on the humerus. However, Buriolestes also lacks a small head and enlarged nostrils, which are typical among sauropodomorphs, and the medial condyle on the end of its tibia projects backwards, a distinctive feature (autapomorphy) unique to this animal.

In Buriolestes, the shaft of the pubis is straight, in contrast to later sauropodomorphs, where it has been modified into an expanded "apron", theropods, where it forms a "boot," and all ornithischians, where it is reversed and is parallel to the ischium. Additional traits differentiate Buriolestes from both later and contemporary sauropodomorphs: the front expansion (preacetabular ala) of the ilium is relatively tall, the outer edges of the pubis are bevelled, the trochanter of the femur forms a shelf, and the metatarsal of the fifth digit on the foot is relatively long.

Skeletally mature specimens of Buriolestes exhibit intraspecific variation through size disparity, with one robust individual weighing over 15.4 kg (34 lb) and others weighing between 6.4–7.2 kg (14–16 lb). This robust specimen is collected from the Piche site, which makes it the first Buriolestes specimen outside the type locality.

A 2020 study by Rodrigo T. Müller et al. that analysed Buriolestes' endocranial anatomy indicated a similar brain morphology to crocodiles. Furthermore, the well-developed optic lobe suggests that Buriolestes was a sight-based predator, as its olfactory bulb was comparatively underdeveloped. The volume of the brain endocast additionally suggests a higher encephalisation quotient than sauropods such as Diplodocus, Nigersaurus, and Brachiosaurus. The well-developed flocculus is similar to Saturnalia, and the authors infer this to be the ancestral condition for sauropodomorpha.

In 2022, Aureliano and colleagues performed a mirco-computed tomography scan on the postcranial skeletons of some of the earliest saurischian dinosaurs that lived during the late Carnian including Gnathovorax with sauropodomorphs Pampadromaeus and Buriolestes, which showed that the invasive air sac system was absent and that their bones were not pneumatised. These results indicate that pneumatisation in archosaur groups (pterosaurs, theropods and sauropodomorphs) are not homologous, but are traits that independently evolved at least 3 times.

== Classification ==
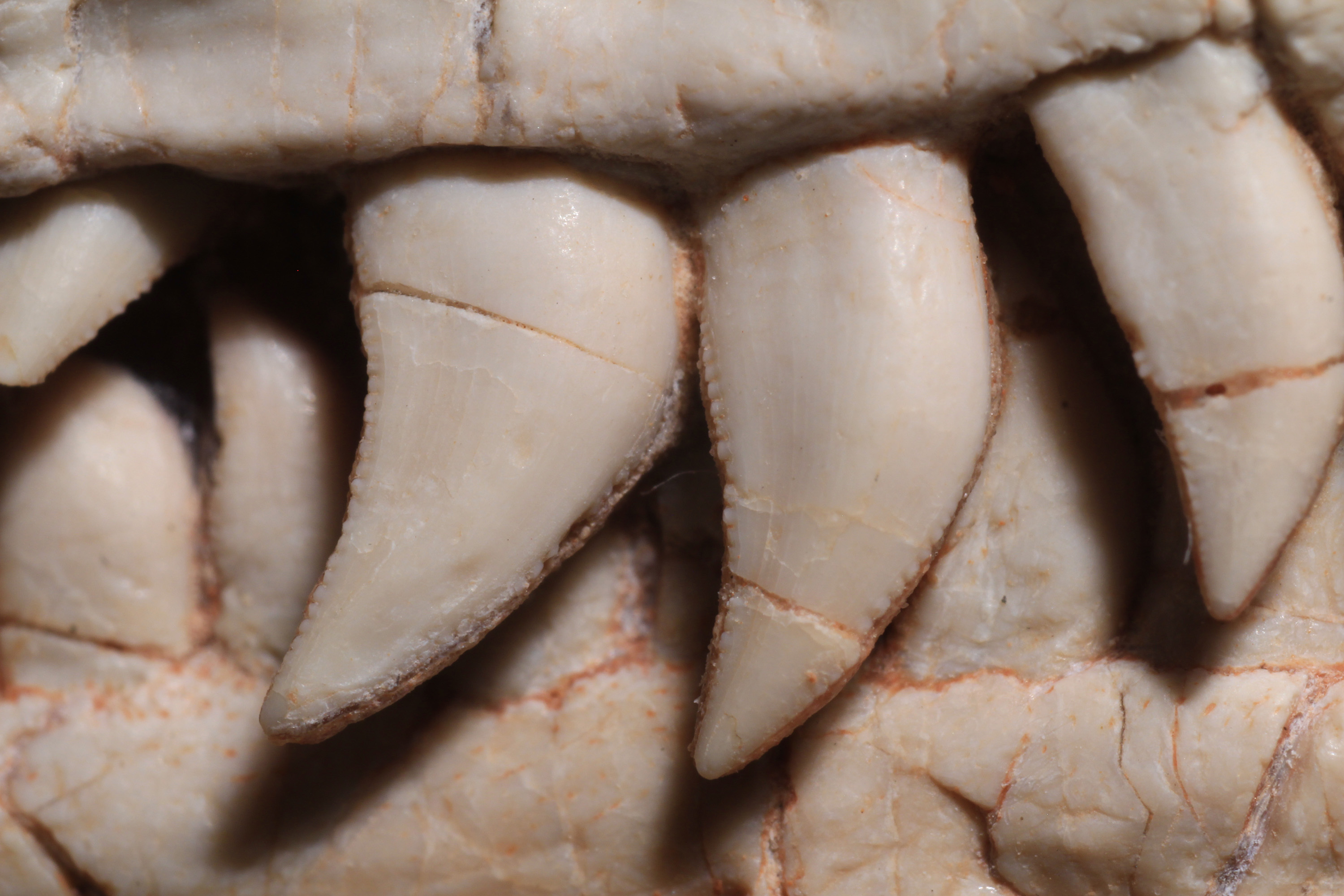
A close-up of the holotype's teeth

A phylogenetic analysis conducted in 2016 affirmed the sauropodomorph affinities of Buriolestes. Part of the phylogenetic tree from the study is shown below.

- Dinosauria
  - Ornithischia
  - Saurischia
    - Herrerasauridae
    - - Daemonosaurus
      - - - Tawa
          - Chindesaurus
        - - Eodromaeus
          - - Guaibasaurus
            - - Theropoda
              - Sauropodomorpha
                - Buriolestes
                - - Eoraptor
                  - - Pampadromaeus
                    - - Panphagia
                      - - Saturnalia
                        - Chromogisaurus
                      - - Pantydraco
                        - - Efraasia
                          - Plateosaurus

Five variants of phylogenetic analyses published earlier were used along with the description of the new specimens in 2018. One of these analyses, based on Langer et al. (2017) placed Buriolestes in a clade of early sauropodomorphs, alongside Eoraptor, Panphagia, Pampadromaeus, and Saturnalia. Another analysis, which used the dataset of Buriolestes' original description with the added parameter of implied weighting, placed it as the sister taxon to Eoraptor, with the Buriolestes+Eoraptor clade sister to a clade connecting Panphagia and Pampadromaeus. The other three analyses, which also corresponded to the original description's dataset, agreed with that study's placement of Buriolestes as the single most basal sauropodomorph.

== Paleoecology ==
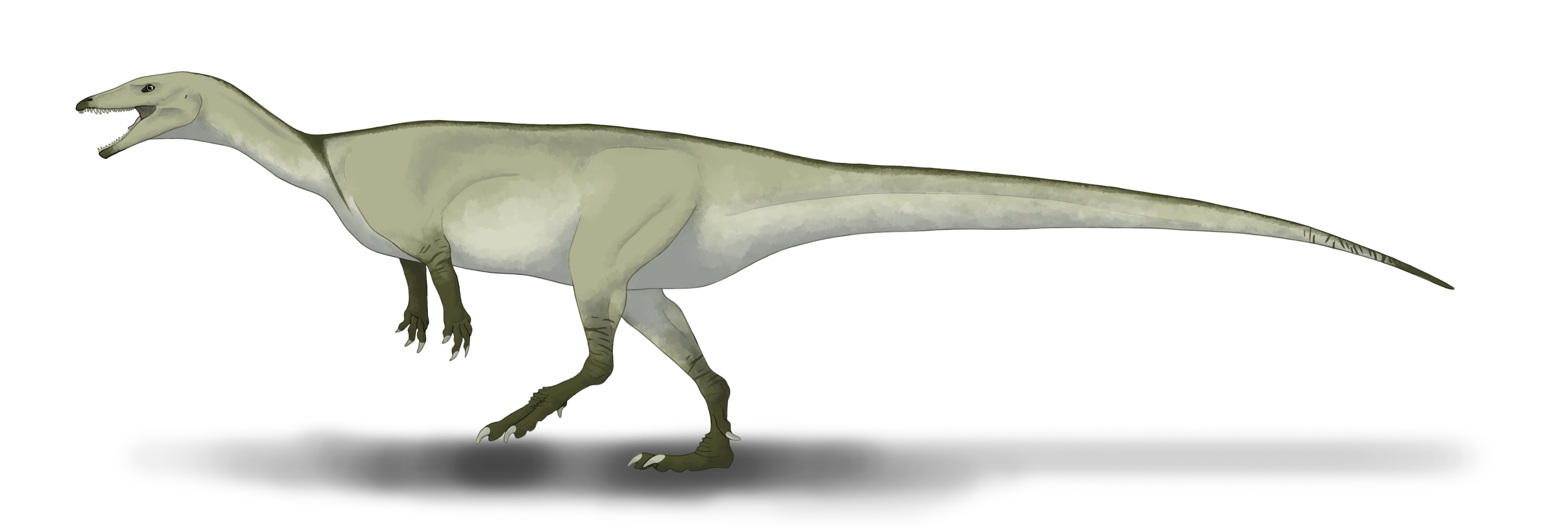
Restoration of Buriolestes schultzi

The shape of the teeth of Buriolestes suggest that it was a carnivore which fed on small vertebrates and invertebrates, which provides evidence that sauropodomorphs - and likely all saurischians and dinosaurs as a whole - were ancestrally carnivorous, and that sauropodomorphs, ornithischians, and various groups of theropods independently became herbivorous.

The co-occurrence of Buriolestes and Ixalerpeton parallels the simultaneous presence of dinosaurs and non-dinosaur dinosauromorphs at other sites (such as the Ischigualasto and Chinle Formations), suggesting that, after their initial evolutionary radiation, dinosaurs did not rapidly replace their dinosauromorph precursors.

== See also ==
- 2016 in paleontology
