= Jagüé =

Coordinates: 28°38′S 68°24′W

- Municipality and village
- Interactive map of Jagüé
- Country: Argentina
- Province: La Rioja Province
- Time zone: UTC−3 (ART)

Jagüé is a municipality and village in Vinchina Department, La Rioja Province in northwestern Argentina.. Its population is 230 as of 2010.

Well-preserved fossil remains of Huayracursor jaguensis, one of the earliest bagualosaurian sauropodomorph dinosaurs, were found here, and the species was named after the village of Jagüé in 2025.
