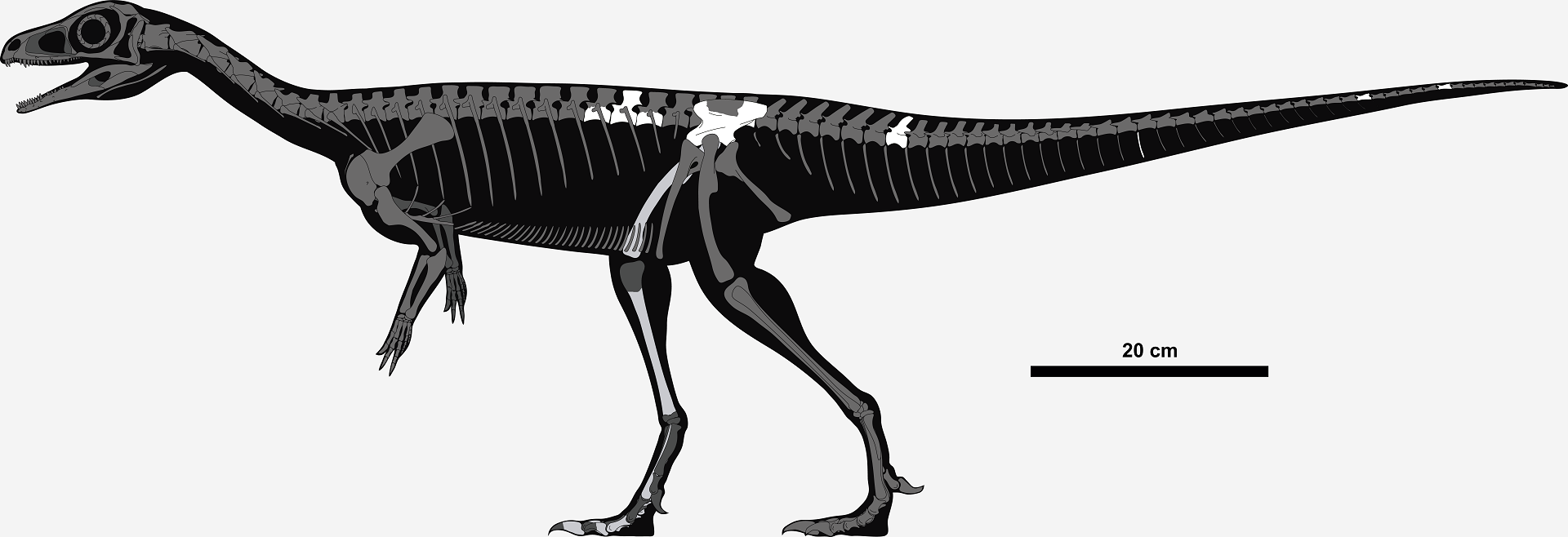
- Skeletal diagram of Nhandumirim, as an early sauropodomorph, following all the subsequent studies after its original description

Scientific classification
- Kingdom: Animalia
- Phylum: Chordata
- Class: Reptilia
- Clade: Dinosauria
- Clade: Saurischia
- Clade: †Sauropodomorpha
- Family: †Saturnaliidae
- Genus: †Nhandumirim; Marsola et al. 2019
- Species: †N. waldsangae

Binomial name
- †Nhandumirim waldsangae Marsola et al. 2019

= Nhandumirim =

Nhandumirim Temporal range: Carnian ~233 Ma

Genus of reptiles (fossil)

Nhandumirim (meaning "small rhea" in the Tupi language) is a genus of basal sauropodomorph dinosaur from the Carnian age of Late Triassic Brazil. It is currently considered a saturnaliid sauropodomorph. The type and only species, Nhandumirim waldsangae, is known from a single immature specimen including vertebrae, a chevron, pelvic material, and a hindlimb found in the Santa Maria Formation in Rio Grande do Sul.

Nhandumirim is differentiated from other Santa Maria dinosaurs such as Staurikosaurus and Saturnalia on the basis of its more gracile, long-legged proportions and several more specific skeletal features. However, it is noteworthy that the holotype is an immature individual. Several features of the tibia led the describers to consider the genus to be possibly the earliest theropod, but some analyses in their study offer alternative positions within Saurischia. All subsequent studies considered Nhandumirim an early sauropodomorph, closely related to Saturnalia and Chromogisaurus.

== Discovery ==
Nhandumirim is known from a single partial skeleton, LPRP/USP 0651, which includes several vertebrae, a right ilium, and most of a right hindlimb. This skeleton was found at the site of Cerro da Alemoa (also known as Waldsanga or Sanga do Mato) in Santa Maria, Rio Grande do Sul. Waldsanga is a historically important Triassic site which also preserved the type specimens of Saturnalia, Rauisuchus, Gomphodontosuchus, and Alemoatherium. The site preserves Carnian-age sediments of the Santa Maria Formation, and LPRP/USP 0651 specifically comes from the top of the Alemoa member on that site. The generic name Nhandumirim roughly translates to "small rhea" in the Tupi-Guarani language. The specific name refers to Waldsanga.

== Description ==
The dorsal vertebrae have spool-shaped centra which are about 1.4 times longer than high, making them more elongated than those of herrerasaurids. Several areas on the dorsals are incised, such as the sides of the centrum (which each have a shallow depression) and the rear of the neural arch (which has postzygapophyseal centrodiapophyseal and centrodiapophyseal fossae). There were likely three sacral vertebrae, with at least the first one articulating with the hip akin to the "primordial" first sacral of other reptiles. This contrasts with Saturnalia in which the first sacral vertebra is an incorporated dorsal vertebra without the hallmarks of a primordial sacral. The sacral vertebrae were thick and wide, but not fused to each other or their respective sacral ribs. The most complete sacral rib was fan shaped when seen from above and has a cross section which gradually curves upwards towards the front, also unlike Saturnalia which has a more L-shaped cross section. The caudal vertebrae increase in length and gradually reduce the size of their transverse processes from the base of the tail to the tip. Caudals at the base of the tail have pronounced midline keels along their entire lower edge. This characteristic is seemingly unique to Nhandumirim, as the only other dinosauromorphs with ventral keels in proximal caudals are Dracoraptor (which had paired, not midline, keels) and Efraasia (in which they were restricted to the front third of the centrum). The zygapophyses of the caudals are short, unlike the longer joints of herrerasaurids and neotheropods.

The ilium is generally typical for early dinosaurs, with a perforated acetabulum, conspicuous antitrochanter, and a postacetabular process which was much longer than the preacetabular process. The ischiadic peduncle is expanded in a front-to-back direction like that of neotheropods. There is an L-shaped scar on the inner edge of the iliac blade which received the first sacral vertebra, and there was enough room for two more sacrals behind it. The outer surface of postacetabular process has two holes and a pronounced incision along its lower edge, known as a brevis fossa. In most dinosaurs which have a brevis fossa, it clearly starts at the base of the postacetabular process, according to a ridge which delineates its upper edge. However, Nhandumirim's brevis fossa only occupies the rear 3/4ths of the postacetabular process, with no clear interaction with the main portion of the ilium.

The femur is slender and thin-walled. The proximal portion possessed early dinosaurian hallmarks such as an anterior trochanter, a facies articularis antitrochanterica, well-developed medial tubera separated by a deep ligament sulcus, and an asymmetrical and pronounced fourth trochanter. The femoral head also possessed a deep and curved groove, but the appearance of this groove is known to be variable within some dinosaur species, so it is not particularly informative for Nhandumirim's classification. The trochanteric shelf was not present, but a homologous muscle attachment scar did exist in the same area, along with a more proximally-located anterolateral scar similar to that reported in some silesaurids. Unlike other early dinosaurs, the dorsolateral trochanter was characteristically short, ending quite a distance away from the femoral head like the anterior trochanter. The distal portion had a wide medial condyle and muscle scars similar to those of Herrerasaurus.

The tibia was poorly preserved but did possess several features similar to those of neotheropods. These include a tall facet for the ascending process of the astragalus and a distal tip which was wide and flattened when seen from below and boxy when seen from the front. There was also a diagonal mound-like tuberosity on the anterior surface of the tibia. Nhandumirim is the only known dinosaur to possess both these neotheropod-like traits and a diagonal tuberosity. The more complete fibula was elongated (~10% longer than the femur) and had scars for the tibial ligament and iliofibularis muscle near the knee. There was a semicircular facet for the ascending process of the astragalus on the portion of the fibula contacting the heel, a characteristic unique to Nhandumirim. Metatarsal II is straight, with a flattened proximal portion and boxy distal portion. Metatarsal IV has a more irregularly-shaped distal portion but is also straight, an unusual feature more akin to Lagerpeton and pterosaurs rather than the more curved bone of other dinosaurs. Isolated phalanges are variable in proportions, with one having a wide proximal articulation and the rest having tall, triangular proximal articulations and more well-developed joint surfaces. Unguals are triangular in cross section and curved, though not to the extent seen in more advanced theropods.

== Classification ==
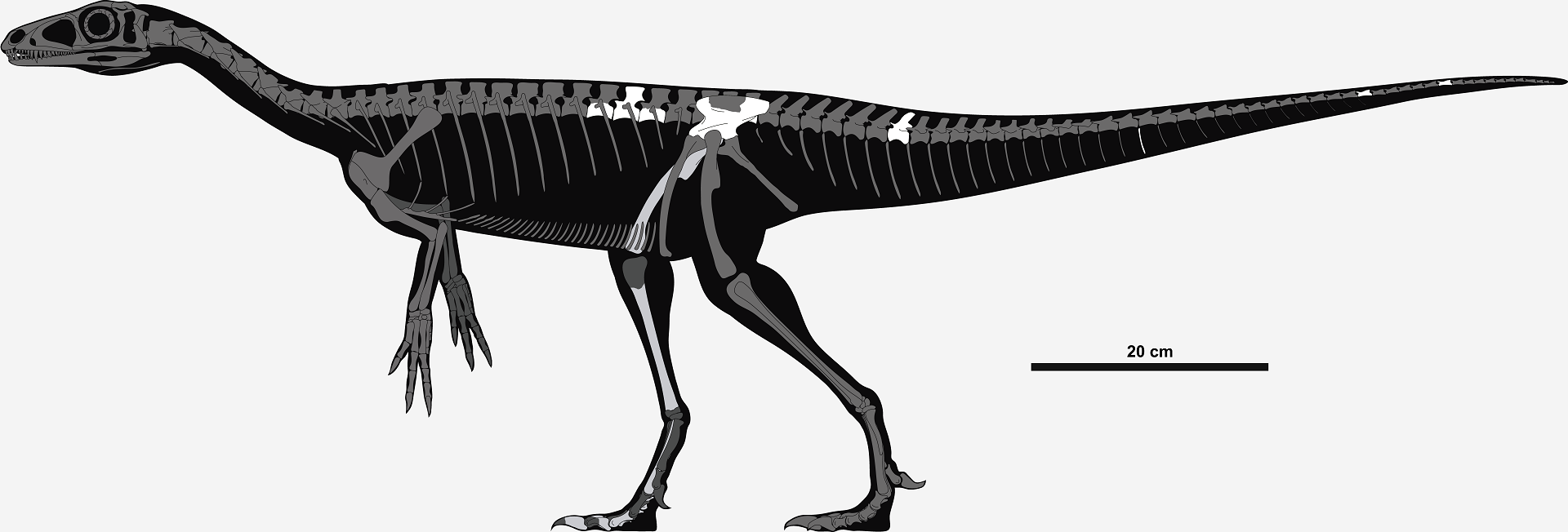
Alternative skeletal diagram for Nhandumirim, reconstructed as an early theropod as in its original description

The describers of Nhandumirim tested its relations using two phylogenetic analyses focused around the origin of dinosaurs. The first one, created previously by Cabreira et al. (2016), considered it the basalmost theropod, as the sister taxon to neotheropods. This is supported by a wide ischiadic peduncle and several traits of the tibia. The Cabreira et al. (2016) analysis is notable for excluding several other traditional basal theropods from the group. These include Daemonosaurus, Tawa, Chindesaurus, and Eodromaeus, which are considered basal saurischians according to their results.

Adding Nhandumirim to the second analysis, created by Nesbitt & Ezcurra (2015), led to inconclusive results. In the strict consensus tree (average result of most parsimonious trees), Nhandumirim is part of a broad polytomy at the base of Saurischia, along with several traditional basal theropods, herrerasaurids, and Eoraptor (which, on the other hand, is frequently considered an early sauropodomorph in most recent analyses). This is because it is a "wildcard" taxon with several equally likely positions within Saurischia. These positions may include Nhandumirim as the sister taxon to all other saurischians, as the sister taxon to Eoraptor, or as the sister taxon to all other theropods (which also includes herrerasaurids in this option). Regardless, the authors considered unlikely that Nhandumirim is particularly close to Staurikosaurus or Saturnalia.

Nonetheless, the phylogenetic position of Nhandumirim was also tested in the article describing Gnathovorax cabreirai, which recovered it as a saturnaliine sauropodomorph, close-associated with Saturnalia and Chromogisaurus. Using a modified version of this dataset, an article depicting a novel phylogenetic hypothesis for the position of silesaurids, two follow studies, as well as a study on early dinosaurs from South America based on another dataset also corroborated this position.

The following is a cladogram showing Nhandumirim's placement using Cabreira et al. (2016)'s analysis:

- Dinosauria
  - Ornithischia
  - Saurischia
    - Herrerasauridae
    - - Daemonosaurus
      - - - Tawa
          - Chindesaurus
        - - Eodromaeus
          - - Guaibasaurus
            - Sauropodomorpha
            - Theropoda
              - Nhandumirim
              - - - Coelophysis bauri
                  - "Syntarsus" rhodesiensis
                  - "Syntarsus" kayentakatae
                - - Liliensternus
                  - Zupaysaurus
                  - "Petrified Forest Tetrapod"
                  - Dilophosaurus
