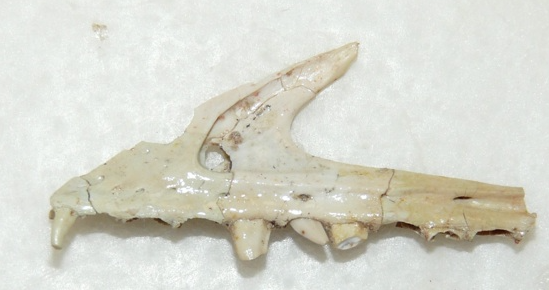
- Referred left maxilla

Scientific classification
- Kingdom: Animalia
- Phylum: Chordata
- Class: Reptilia
- Clade: Dinosauria (?)
- Clade: †Ornithischia (?)
- Family: †Silesauridae (?)
- Genus: †Agnosphitys; Fraser et al., 2002
- Species: †A. cromhallensis

Binomial name
- †Agnosphitys cromhallensis Fraser et al., 2002

= Agnosphitys =

Agnosphitys Temporal range: Late Triassic, 208 Ma

Extinct genus of dinosaurs

Agnosphitys (/ˌæɡnoʊsˈfaɪtɪs/; "unknown begetter"; sometimes mistakenly called Agnostiphys or Agnosphytis) is a genus of dinosauriform that lived during the Late Triassic. It contains only one species, the type species A. cromhallensis. Its remains include an ilium, maxilla, astragalus and humerus, which date variously from the Norian and Rhaetian stages of the Late Triassic, or possibly as late as the Hettangian stage of the Early Jurassic. The fissure fill at Avon, of which Agnosphitys was probably recovered from, was a sinkhole formed by the dissolution of Lower Carboniferous limestones.

== Discovery and naming ==
The type species, Agnosphitys cromhallensis, was described by Nicholas Fraser, Kevin Padian, Gordon Walkden and A. L. M Davis in early 2002. The fossils consist of two specimens. The holotype consists of a single isolated left ilium, while the second specimen consists of a partial skeleton including a left maxilla, a humerus and a left astragalus, were found in the Magnesian Conglomerate of Avon, England.

== Classification ==
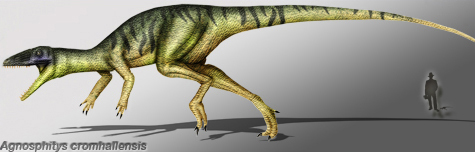
Pre-2017 life restoration showing Agnosphitys as a basal dinosaur

The remains of Agnosphitys defied precise classification in the original description; the describers placed it outside Dinosauria using the definition of Dinosauria outlined by Padian and May (1995) and provided (on p. 80) the following diagnosis: "Well-defined brevis fossa on the ilium; semi-perforate acetabulum; `kidney-shaped' antitrochanter; well-developed posterior portion of the iliac blade; two sacral vertebrae; subrectangular deltopectoral crest that is 33 per cent of the length of the humerus; astragalus with a distinct ascending process and a prominent depression immediately posterior to the ascending process; in dorsal aspect an acute anteromedial corner on the astragalus."

Despite the paucity of known fossils, Agnosphitys has been included in two phylogenetic analyses analyzing primitive dinosaur relationships. Yates (2007) recovered the genus as a theropod, whereas Ezcurra (2010) recovered it as a member of Guaibasauridae. More recently, Agnosphitys has been considered a silesaurid based on an as-yet-unpublished description of Asilisaurus.

A large phylogenetic analysis of early dinosaurs and dinosauromorphs carried out by Matthew Baron, David Norman and Paul Barrett (2017) recovered Agnosphitys as a member of the clade Silesauridae.
