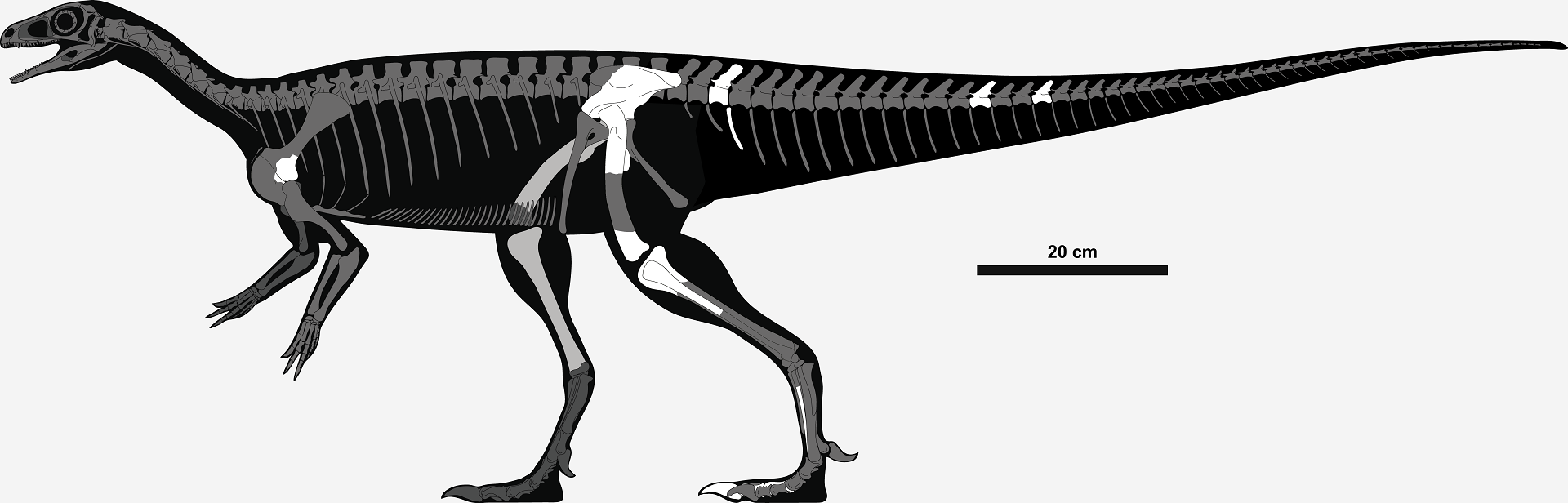
- Skeletal reconstruction of Chromogisaurus novasi. Known elements in white and unknown in dark gray. Missing elements based on Saturnalia tupiniquim

Scientific classification
- Domain: Eukaryota
- Kingdom: Animalia
- Phylum: Chordata
- Clade: Dinosauria
- Clade: Saurischia
- Clade: †Sauropodomorpha
- Family: †Saturnaliidae
- Genus: †Chromogisaurus; Ezcurra, 2010
- Species: †C. novasi

Binomial name
- †Chromogisaurus novasi Ezcurra, 2010

= Chromogisaurus =

Chromogisaurus Temporal range: Late Triassic (Carnian) ~232–230 Ma

Extinct genus of dinosaurs

Chromogisaurus is an extinct genus of saturnaliid sauropodomorph which existed in Argentina during the Late Triassic (Carnian) period. It is from the Cancha de Bochas, Valle Pintado member of the Ischigualasto Formation. It was a small, bipedal herbivore, about 2 metres (6 ft 7 in) in length.

== Description ==
Size comparison

Chromogisaurus was first named by Martín Daniel Ezcurra in 2010, and the type species is Chromogisaurus novasi. The generic name is derived from Greek chroma, "colour", and gè, "earth", a reference to the Valle Pintado, the "Painted Valley". The specific name honours Fernando Emilio Novas. The holotype, PVSJ 845, was found in the Cancha de Bochas Member of the Ischigualasto Formation, dating to the Carnian. This makes Chromogisaurus one of the oldest known dinosaurs. The specimen consists of a partial skeleton lacking the skull, with elements of the front and hind limbs, as well as the pelvis and two caudal vertebrae.

A cladistic analysis by Ezcurra indicated that Chromogisaurus was a member of a clade basal sauropodomorphs, the Guaibasauridae, together with Guaibasaurus, the disputed Agnosphitys, Panphagia and Saturnalia. Within Guaibasauridae, it forms a smaller clade with its sister taxon Saturnalia, the Saturnaliinae.
