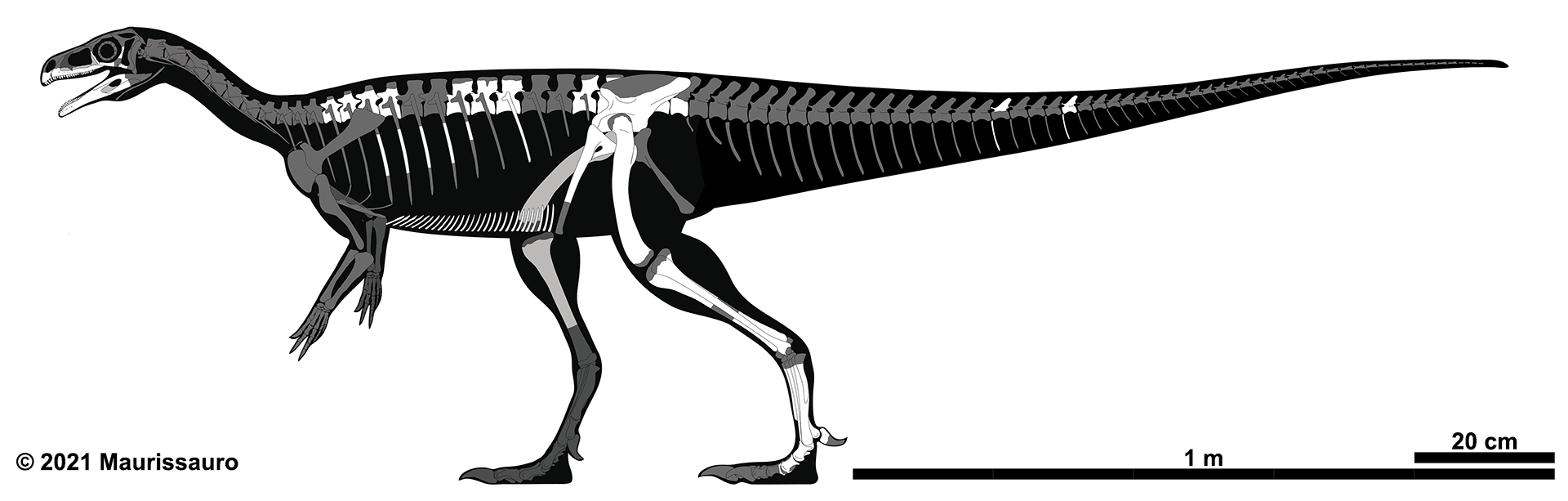
- Skeletal remains of Bagualosaurus agudoensis (known in white/light grey and unknown in dark grey).

Scientific classification
- Kingdom: Animalia
- Phylum: Chordata
- Class: Reptilia
- Clade: Dinosauria
- Clade: Saurischia
- Clade: †Sauropodomorpha
- Clade: †Bagualosauria
- Genus: †Bagualosaurus; Pretto, Langer & Schultz, 2018
- Species: †B. agudoensis

Binomial name
- †Bagualosaurus agudoensis Pretto, Langer & Schultz, 2018

= Bagualosaurus =

Bagualosaurus Temporal range: Carnian ~230 Ma

Extinct genus of dinosaurs

Bagualosaurus is a genus of sauropodomorph dinosaur from the Candelária Sequence (Uppermost Santa Maria Formation) of Brazil, dating to around 230 million years ago, in the Carnian of the Late Triassic. It includes one species, Bagualosaurus agudoensis.

== Discovery ==
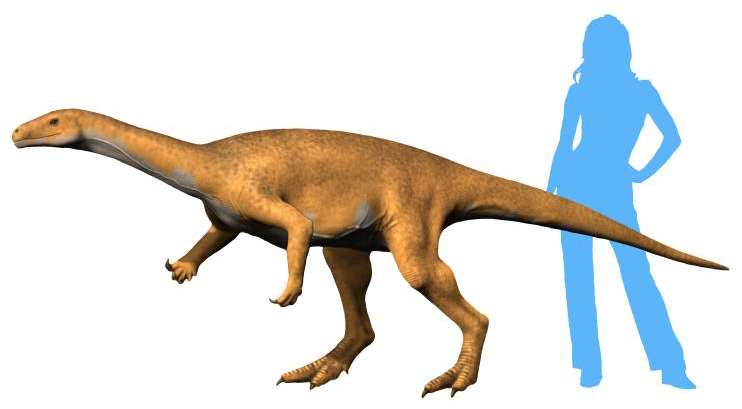
Life restoration and size diagram

In 2007, in a ravine at the outcrop of Janner, near Agudo in Rio Grande do Sul, a sauropodomorph skeleton was excavated. It was removed in a single block of stone. For five years it remained unprepared in the collection of the Laboratório de Paleovertebrados da Universidade Federal do Rio Grande do Sul, curated by Cesar Leandro Schultz. In 2012, Flávio Augusto Pretto began to study the specimen. In 2018, Pretto, Max Cardoso Langer and Schultz named and described the type species Bagualosaurus agudoensis. The generic name is derived from bagual, "strongly built fellow" in the dialect of Rio Grande do Sul, in reference to the strong hindlimbs. The specific name refers to the provenance from Agudo.

The holotype, UFRGS-PV-1099-T, has been found in a layer of red mudstone of the Candelária sequence dating from the latest Carnian. It consists of a partial skeleton with skull. It contains the lower parts of the skull, the lower jaws, nine trunk vertebrae, three sacral vertebrae, two tail vertebrae, ribs, gastralia, chevrons, both ilia, the right pubis, both femora, both tibiae, both fibulae, and most of the left foot. The skeleton was partly articulated but has been damaged by erosion. It was found on its back with the hindlimbs pulled up, a rare position for archosaurian fossils.

== Description ==
Bagualosaurus was a modest-sized basal sauropodomorph, measuring approximately 2.25 metres (7.4 ft) in length that, based on its teeth, was mostly herbivore. Features of its skull and dental structure are similar to Pampadromaeus, which comes from the same beds, and later Norian sauropodomorphs such as Pantydraco, Efraasia and Plateosaurus. However, its post-cranial skeleton resembles earlier forms. Likewise, it is somewhat smaller than Norian sauropodomorphs, yet significantly larger (~45% based on femoral length) than other sauropodomorphs of the Carnian epoch, suggesting that it is transitional between the sauropodomorphs of its time and their later Norian descendants.

== See also ==
- 2018 in paleontology
