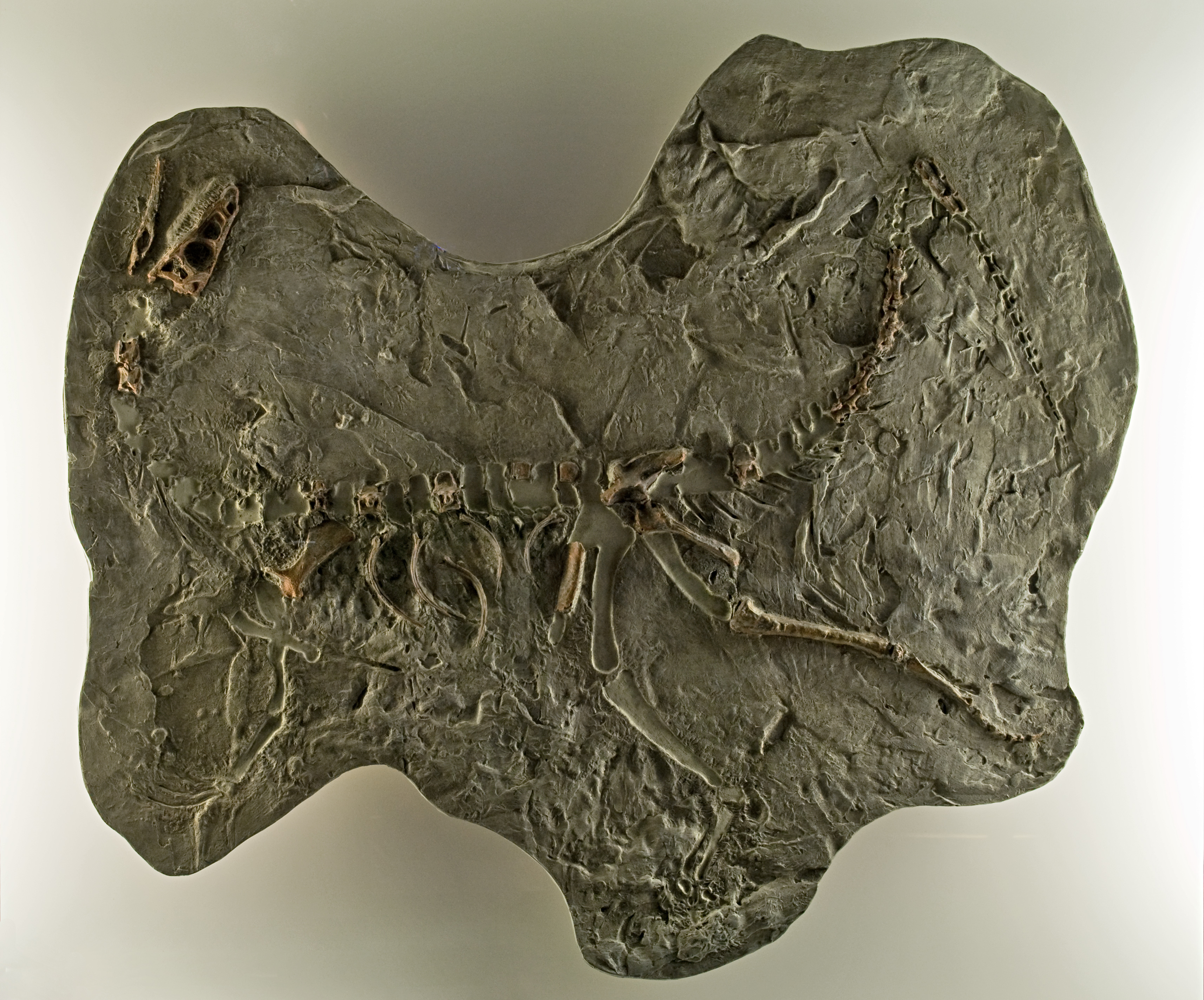
- Replica of the original fossil, with some bones reconstructed. From the Gigasaurier exhibition at Naturmuseum Senckenberg

Scientific classification
- Kingdom: Animalia
- Phylum: Chordata
- Class: Reptilia
- Clade: Dinosauria
- Clade: Saurischia
- Clade: †Sauropodomorpha
- Family: †Saturnaliidae
- Genus: †Panphagia; Martínez & Alcober 2009
- Species: †P. protos

Binomial name
- †Panphagia protos Martínez & Alcober 2009

= Panphagia =

Panphagia Temporal range: Late Triassic (Carnian) ~231 Ma

Extinct genus of dinosaurs

Panphagia is a genus of sauropodomorph dinosaur described in 2009. It lived around 231 million years ago, during the Carnian age of the Late Triassic period in what is now northwestern Argentina. Fossils of the genus were found in the La Peña Member of the Ischigualasto Formation in the Ischigualasto-Villa Unión Basin. The name Panphagia comes from the Greek words pan, meaning "all", and phagein, meaning "to eat", in reference to its inferred omnivorous diet. Panphagia is one of the earliest known dinosaurs, and is an important find which may mark the transition of diet in early sauropodomorph dinosaurs.

== Discovery ==
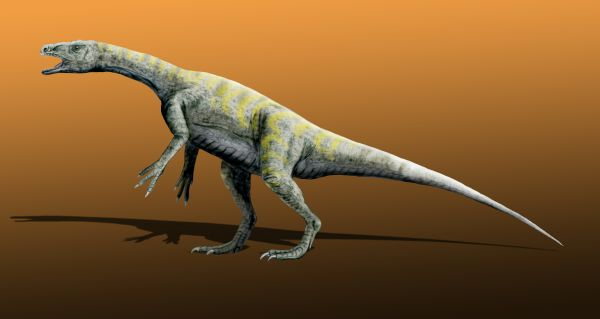
Restoration

Fossils of Panphagia were found in late 2006 by the Argentinean paleontologist Ricardo N. Martínez in rocks of the Ischigualasto Formation of Valle Pintado, Ischigualasto Provincial Park, San Juan Province, Argentina. The bones were found at approximately the same level as a 231.4 million year old ash layer, indicating it lived during the early Carnian of the Late Triassic. Panphagia is currently known from holotype PVSJ 874, the disarticulated remains of one partially grown individual of about 1.30 metres (4.3 ft) long. Portions of the skull, vertebrae, pectoral girdle, pelvic girdle, and hindlimb bones have been recovered. The russet-colored fossils were embedded in a greenish sandstone matrix and took several years to prepare and describe.

== Classification ==
- Saurischia
  - - Herrerasaurus
    - Staurikosaurus
  - - Eoraptor
    - - Theropoda
      - Sauropodomorpha
        - Panphagia
        - - Saturnalia
          - Other sauropodomorphs

Basal saurischian phylogeny simplified after Martinez and Alcober, 2009. This is only one of many proposed cladograms for basal saurischians.

Panphagia was described in 2009 by Ricardo N. Martínez and Oscar A. Alcober, both of the Museo de Ciencias Naturales, in San Juan, Argentina. They performed a phylogenetic analysis and found it to be the most basal known sauropodomorph dinosaur: the fossils shared similar features to those of Saturnalia, an early sauropodomorph, including similarities in the ischium, astragalus, and the scapular blade. Yet the fossils also exhibited similar features to those of Eoraptor, an early omnivorous sauropodomorph, including hollow bones, sublanceolate teeth, and overall proportions. Based on analysis and comparison of the Panphagia fossils and those of its closest kin, Martínez and Alcober concluded that the evolution of saurischian dinosaurs likely began with small, cursorial animals similar to Panphagia, and that there is a "general similarity among all of these basal dinosaurs [suggesting] that few structural changes stand" between Panphagia, Eoraptor, and two basal theropods which have yet to be described.

The type species of Panphagia is P. protos; the specific name, meaning "the first" in Greek, is a reference to its basal position.

== Diet ==
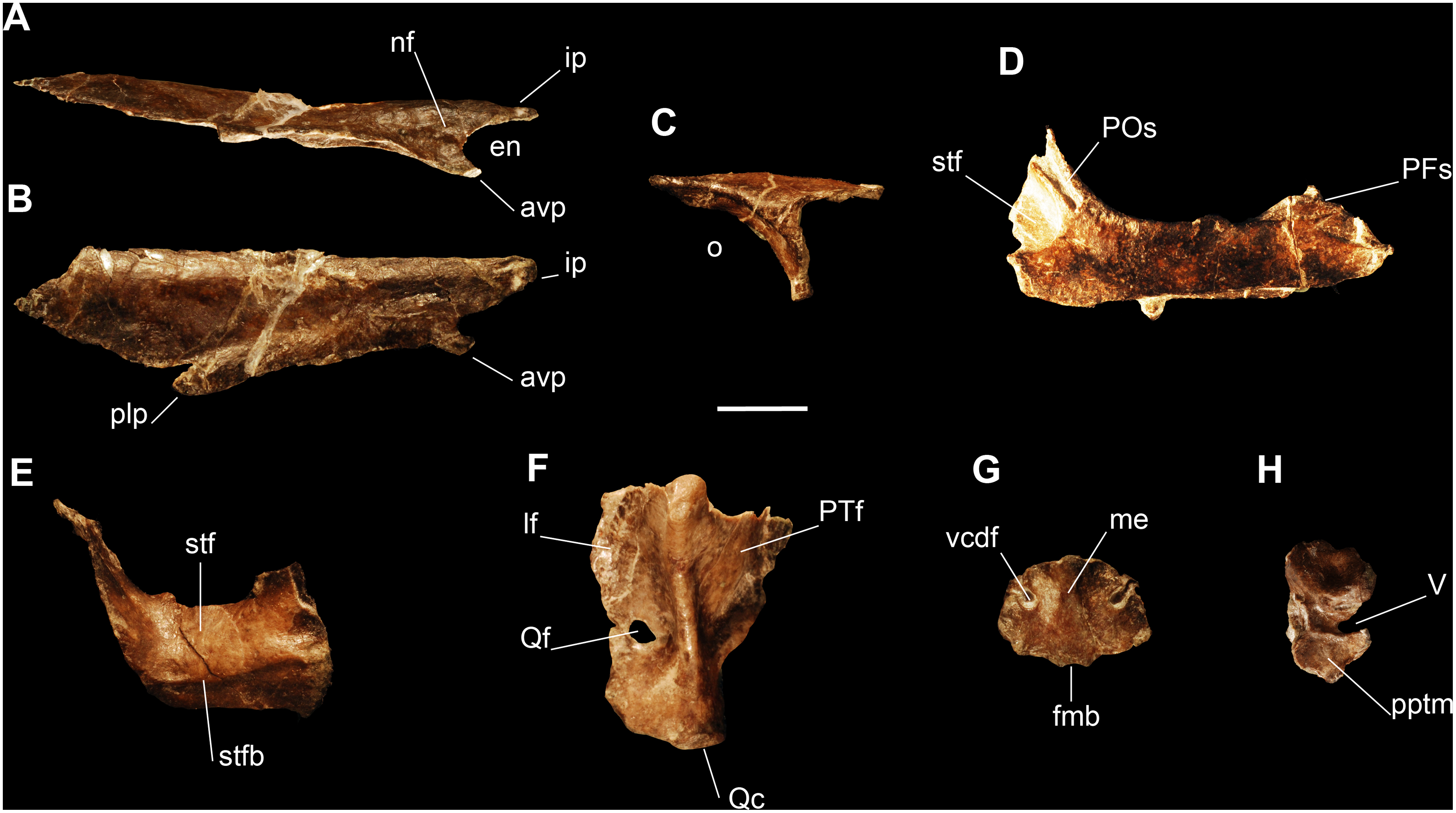
Preserved skull bones of Panphagia protos (PVSJ 874)

The teeth of Panphagia indicate a possible omnivorous diet, transitional in form between the mostly carnivorous theropods and the herbivorous sauropodomorphs. The teeth in the back of the jaw are shorter than those in the front, are leaf-shaped, and also have more marked serrations.

== See also ==
- Saurischia
- 2009 in paleontology
