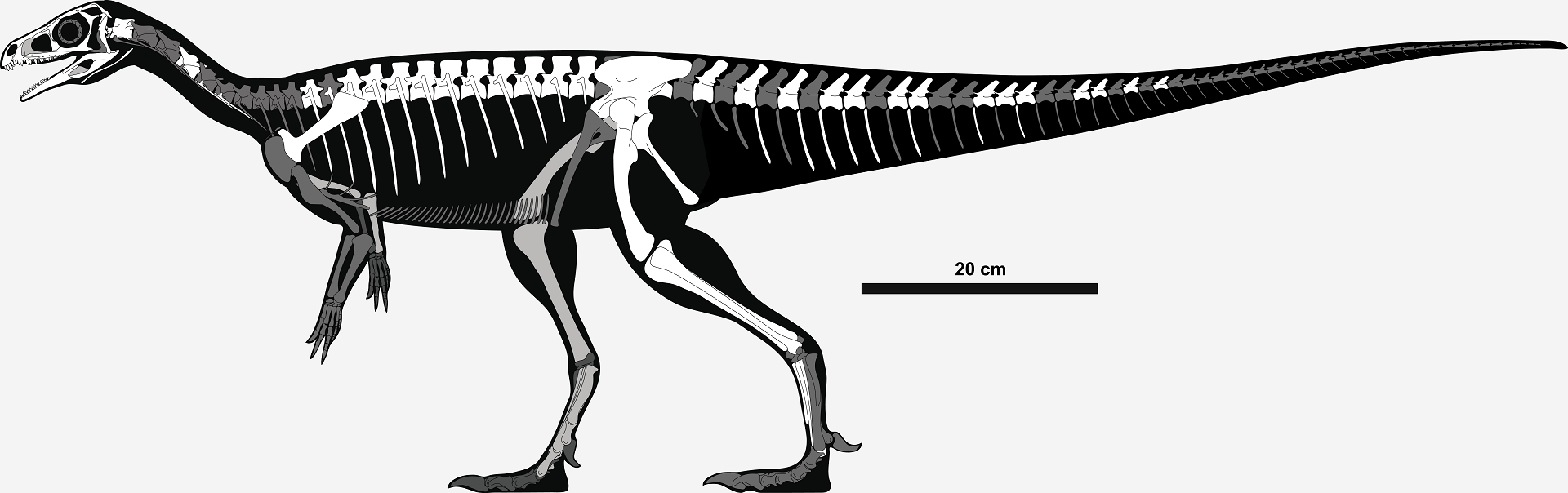
- Skeletal reconstruction showing known remains

Scientific classification
- Kingdom: Animalia
- Phylum: Chordata
- Class: Reptilia
- Clade: Dinosauria
- Clade: Saurischia
- Clade: †Sauropodomorpha
- Family: †Saturnaliidae
- Genus: †Pampadromaeus; Cabreira et al. 2011
- Species: †P. barberenai

Binomial name
- †Pampadromaeus barberenai Cabreira et al. 2011

= Pampadromaeus =

Pampadromaeus Temporal range: Late Triassic (Carnian) ~233.23 Ma

Extinct genus of dinosaurs

Pampadromaeus is an extinct genus of basal sauropodomorph dinosaurs known from the Late Triassic (Carnian) Santa Maria Formation of the Paraná Basin in Rio Grande do Sul, southern Brazil.

== Discovery ==
Pampadromaeus is known only from the holotype specimen ULBRA-PVT016, a disarticulated, partial but well preserved skeleton from a single individual which includes most of the skull bones and the lower jaws; dorsal, sacral and caudal vertebrae; elements of the shoulder girdle and the forelimbs, an ilium and elements of the hindlimbs. It was collected in the upper Hyperodapedon biozone from the Alemoa Member of the Santa Maria Formation (Rosário do Sul Group) in the "Janner" (also known as "Várzea do Agudo") locality, geopark of Paleorrota, dating to the Carnian faunal stage of the early Late Triassic, about 230–228 Ma ago. A U-Pb (uranium decay) dating found that the Santa Maria Formation dated around 233.23 Ma, putting it 1.5 million years older than the Ischigualasto Formation, and making the two formations approximately equal as the earliest dinosaur localities.

== Description ==
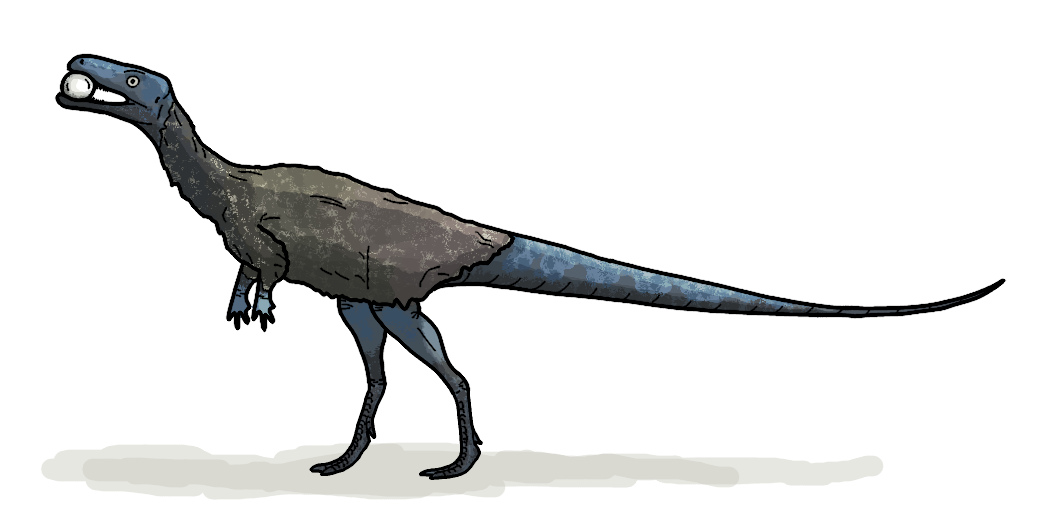
Life restoration

Pampadromaeus was a small bipedal animal. It shows a mosaic of basal and derived traits. It differs from other sauropodomorphs by a combination of characters. Some of these are shared with members of the Theropoda: the premaxilla is pointed downwards forming a subnarial gap with the maxilla and the anterior-most teeth are unserrated; in the location where with theropods the fenestra promaxillaris is positioned, a small depression is present. Basal traits consist of a large skull, a short thighbone, the possession of just two sacral vertebrae and the presence of fifteen teeth in the pterygoid.

There were four teeth in the premaxilla and about twenty in both the maxilla and the lower jaw for a total of eighty-eight. The teeth were large, elongated, lanceolate, slightly recurved, sharply pointed and coarsely serrated. The lower leg was much longer than the thighbone, indicating a cursorial lifestyle.

In 2022, Tito Aureliano and colleagues performed a micro-computed tomography scan on the postcranial skeletons of some of the earliest saurischian dinosaurs that lived during the late Carnian including the herrerasaurid Gnathovorax with sauropodomorphs Pampadromaeus and Buriolestes, which showed that the invasive air sac system was absent and that their bones were not pneumatised. These results indicate that pneumatisation in archosaur groups (pterosaurs, theropods and sauropodomorphs) are not homologous, but are traits that independently evolved at least 3 times.

== Etymology ==
Pampadromaeus was first named by Sergio F. Cabreira, Cesar L. Schultz, Jonathas S. Bittencourt, Marina B. Soares, Daniel C. Fortier, Lúcio R. Silva and Max C. Langer in 2011 and the type species is Pampadromaeus barberenai. The generic name is derived from Quechua pampa, "plain", in reference to the present landscape of the site, and Greek δρομεύς, dromeus, "runner", referring to the cursorial habits; the Latinised spelling variant dromaeus is used. The specific name honours the Brazilian paleontologist Mário Costa Barberena.

== Phylogeny ==
Pampadromaeus was found to be a basal sauropodomorph in four different cladistic analyses. The describers emphasized however, that this position was not strongly supported, showing the difficulties of determining the affinities of such early forms with the basal Dinosauromorpha, Saurischia, Sauropodomorpha and Theropoda.
