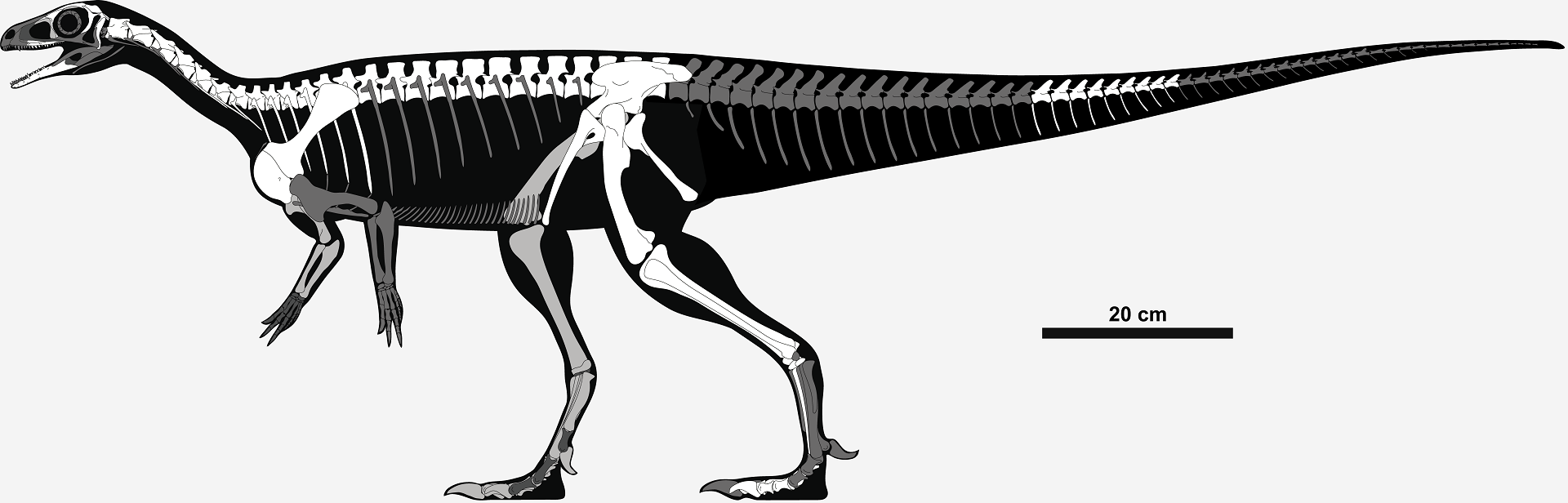
- Skeletal reconstruction showing known remains as of 2019

Scientific classification
- Kingdom: Animalia
- Phylum: Chordata
- Class: Reptilia
- Clade: Dinosauria
- Clade: Saurischia
- Clade: †Sauropodomorpha
- Family: †Saturnaliidae
- Genus: †Saturnalia; Langer et al., 1999
- Species: †S. tupiniquim

Binomial name
- †Saturnalia tupiniquim Langer et al., 1999

Synonyms
- ?Nhandumirim waldsangae Marsola et al., 2018

= Saturnalia tupiniquim =

Saturnalia Temporal range: Late Triassic, 233.23 Ma

Extinct genus of dinosaurs

Saturnalia is an extinct genus of basal sauropodomorph dinosaur known from the Late Triassic Santa Maria Formation of Rio Grande do Sul, southern Brazil. It contains one species, Saturnalia tupiniquim. It is one of the earliest known dinosaurs.

== Discovery and naming ==
Fossils of Saturnalia were first collected by the Museum of Science and Technology of the Pontifical Catholic University of Rio Grande do Sul in the austral summer of 1998. Some of the specimens were collected during Carnival. The specimens were found at a site called Wald Sanga or Sanga do Mato, one of several sites called "sangas" in the vicinity of Santa Maria, Rio Grande do Sul, where red, fossil-bearing mudstone is exposed.

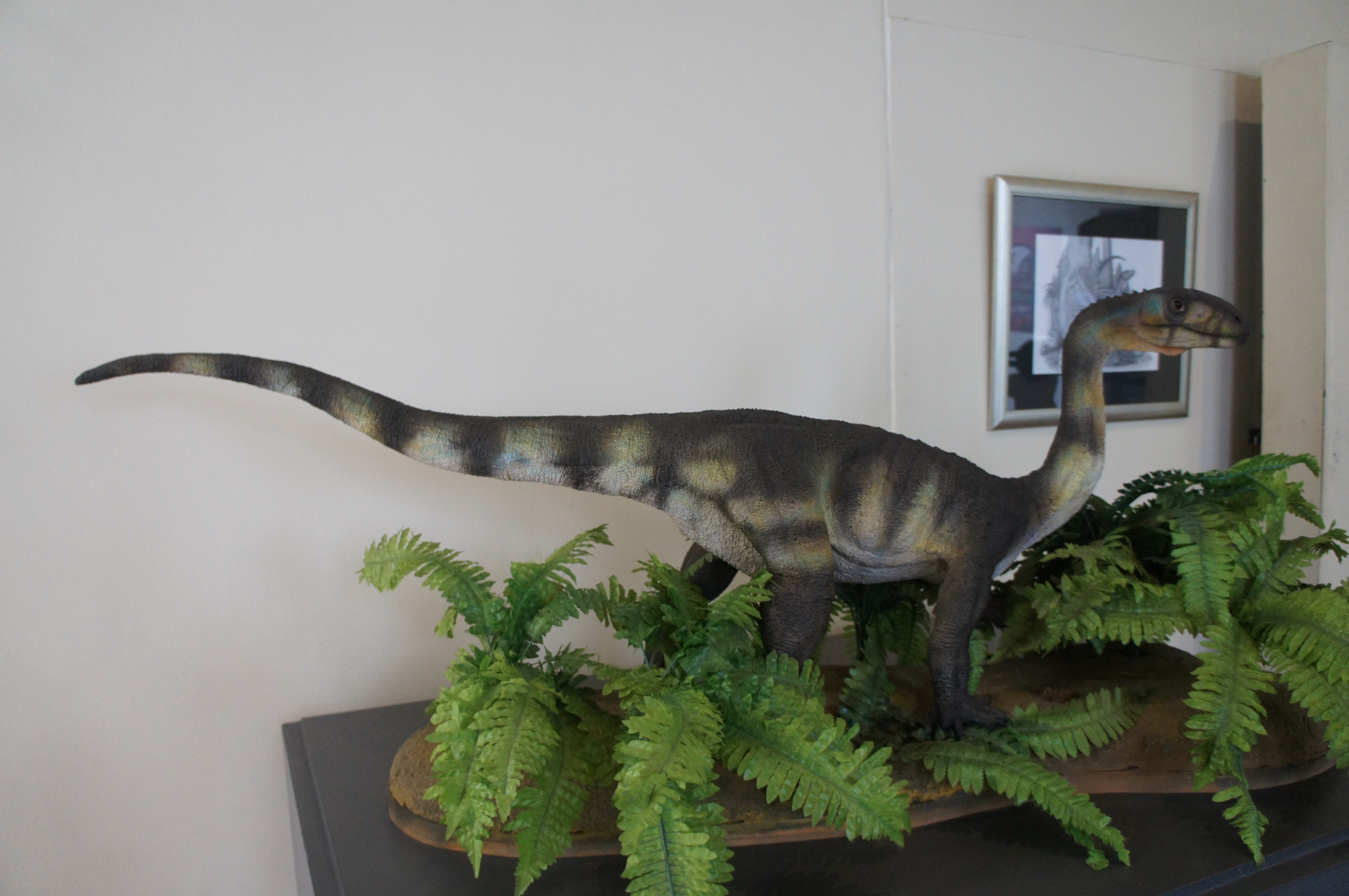
Model showing outdated quadrupedal posture, Museu Nacional, Rio de Janeiro

In 1999, Max Cardoso Langer, Fernando Abdala, Martha Richter, and Michael J. Benton described the new genus and species Saturnalia tupiniquim based on the three skeletons. The genus name is derived from the Roman festival of Saturnalia, in reference to the specimens' discovery during the festival of Carnival, and the species name, tupiniquim, is a word of Guarani origin colloquially used in Portuguese to refer to things of Brazilian origin.

Numerous studies have since been published on Saturnalia, making it one of the best-studied Carnian sauropodomorphs.

=== Fossil record ===
Saturnalia tupiniquim is known from three well-preserved partial skeletons and disarticulated remains from at least three other individuals. The holotype, MCP 3844-PV is a partial skeleton including most of the presacral vertebrae and sacrum, the pectoral and pelvic girdles, the right humerus and part of the right ulna, the left femur, and most of the right hind limb. The paratypes are MCP 3845-PV, a partial skeleton including a partial skull, trunk vertebrae, pectoral girdle, right side of the pelvic girdle, right humerus, and most of the right hind limb, and MCP 3846-PV, a partial skeleton including trunk vertebrae, a tibia, and part of the foot. Referred material, cataloged as UFSM 11660, consists of the disarticulated remains of at least three other individuals, including a partial skull and remains of the pelvis and hindlimb. Another specimen, LPRP/USP 0651, consisting of a few vertebrae, ilium, and most of the right hind limb, was originally described as representing a distinct species, Nhandumirim waldsangae, but may be a juvenile individual of Saturnalia tupiniquim.

The known fossils of Saturnalia all come from a single site in the Alemoa Member of the Santa Maria Formation, and are included in the Hyperodapedon Assemblage Zone. A maximum age for the Saturnalia type locality, determined by uranium–lead dating, is 233.23 ± 0.61 million years old. Because this age is derived from detrital zircons, it is a maximum age and the true age might be slightly less, making the rocks approximately equivalent in age to the base of the Ischigualasto Formation, which has been found to be approximately 231.5 million years old. Saturnalia is among the oldest known dinosaurs.

== Description ==
Size chart

Saturnalia was a small, bipedal animal that probably reached a length of 1.5 metres (4.9 ft) and weighed between 4 and 11 kilograms (8.8 and 24.3 lb). (Note: A mass of 6.5 to 11 kilograms (14 to 24 lb) was estimated based on the femur circumference. Paul suggested a smaller mass of 4 kg (8 lb).) The skull of Saturnalia was only about 10 centimetres (3.9 in) long, giving it a proportionally small head as in other sauropodomorphs. It was relatively short-snouted compared to contemporary sauropodomorphs. The neck of Saturnalia was moderately long, about 56–60% the length of the trunk, and was composed of nine or ten vertebrae. (Note: Because the known specimens do not preserve articulated ribs and shoulder girdles, it is difficult to determine whether the tenth vertebra in the series is the last cervical or first dorsal vertebra.)

== Classification ==
The plesiomorphic nature of Saturnalia, combined with its mixture of sauropodomorph and theropod characteristics, has made it difficult to classify. Paleontologist Max Cardoso Langer and colleagues, in their 1999 description of the genus, assigned it to the Sauropodomorpha. However, in a 2003 paper, Langer noted that features of its skull and hand were more similar to the theropods, and that Saturnalia could at best be considered a member of the sauropodomorph "stem-lineage", rather than a true member of that group.

José Bonaparte and colleagues, in a 2007 study, found Saturnalia to be very similar to the early saurischian Guaibasaurus. Bonaparte placed the two in the same family, Guaibasauridae. Like Langer, Bonaparte found that these forms may have been basal sauropodomorphs, or an assemblage of forms close to the common ancestor of the sauropodomorphs and theropods. Overall, Bonaparte found that both Saturnalia and Guaibasaurus were more theropod-like than prosauropod-like. However, all more recent cladistic analyses found it to be a very basal sauropodomorph, possibly guaibasaurid, as the family was found to nest in a basal position within Sauropodomorpha. The subfamily Saturnaliinae was established in 2010 by Martin Ezcurra to include Saturnalia and its close relative Chromogisaurus.

== Paleobiology ==
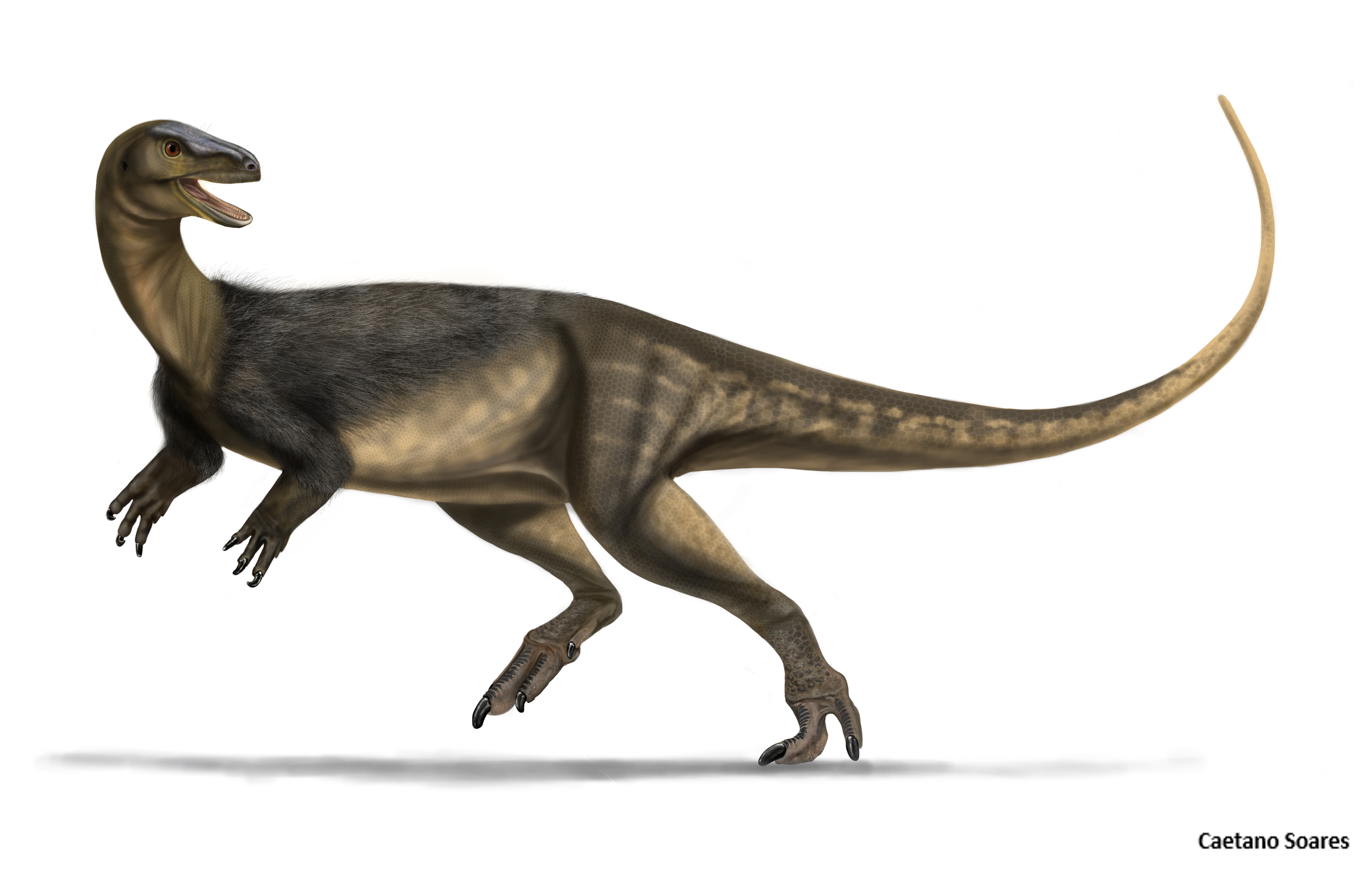
Life restoration

Like many other early dinosaurs, but unlike later sauropodomorphs, Saturnalia was most likely carnivorous or omnivorous, with a diet that included insects or small vertebrates. Its small head and long neck may have allowed it to move its head rapidly enough to catch small, elusive prey.

== Paleoecology ==
Saturnalia may have been prey to the contemporary herrerasaurid Staurikosaurus. Buriolestes, a carnivorous sauropodomorph similar to Saturnalia, was contemporaneous with it, although the two have yet to be discovered at the exact same locality. Buriolestes was longer-snouted than Saturnalia and the two may demonstrate niche partitioning.
