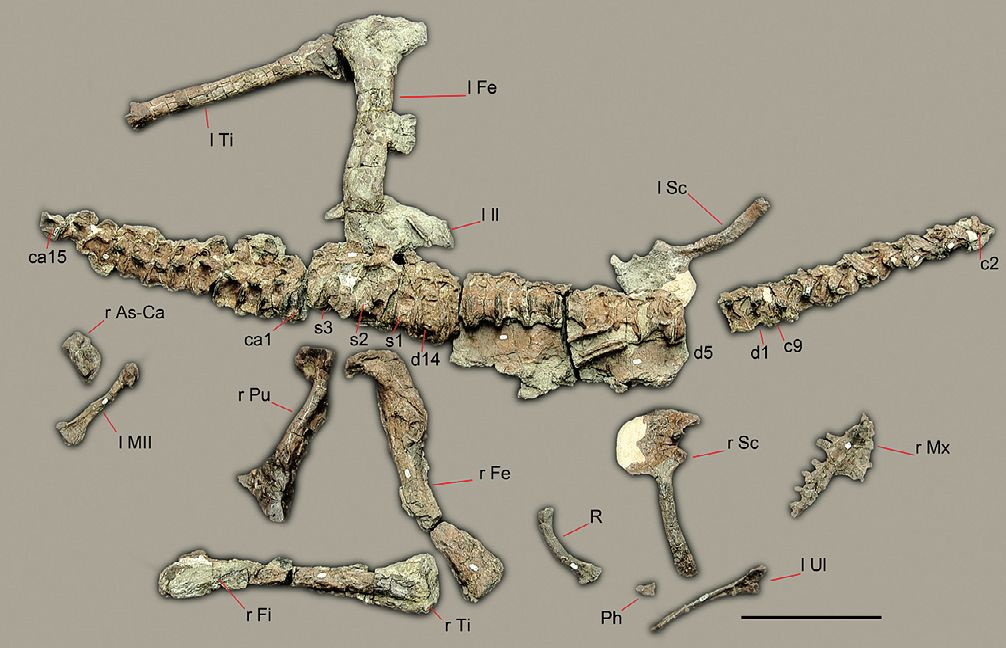
- Preserved bones of the holotype specimen

Scientific classification
- Kingdom: Animalia
- Phylum: Chordata
- Class: Reptilia
- Clade: Dinosauria
- Clade: Saurischia
- Family: †Herrerasauridae
- Genus: †Sanjuansaurus; Alcober & Martinez, 2010
- Species: †S. gordilloi

Binomial name
- †Sanjuansaurus gordilloi Alcober & Martinez, 2010

= Sanjuansaurus =

Sanjuansaurus Temporal range: Carnian ~231.4 Ma

Extinct genus of dinosaurs

Sanjuansaurus ("San Juan Province lizard") is a genus of herrerasaurid dinosaur from the Late Triassic (Carnian) Ischigualasto Formation of the Ischigualasto-Villa Unión Basin in northwestern Argentina.

== Discovery ==
Sanjuansaurus was named and described in 2010 by Oscar Alcober and Ricardo Martinez. The type species was named S. gordilloi after Raul Gordillo, the head fossil preparator and artist of the San Juan Museum. It is known from and based on an associated and partially articulated partial skeleton (PVSJ 605) consisting of a jaw fragment, most of the vertebral column from the axis to the anterior tail, the shoulder blades, an ulna, part of the pelvis, most of the long bones of the legs, and a few other bones.

PVSJ 605 was discovered in 1994, in gray-green sandstone 40 meters above the base of the Ischigualasto Formation, in Ischigualasto Provincial Park in San Juan, Argentina. An ash bed from the early part of the formation dates to approximately 231.4 Ma, during the late Carnian Stage of the Late Triassic. The original description indicated that the skeleton was from the earliest part of the Cancha de Bochas Member, though later sources suggested that it was from the upper La Peña member.

== Description and classification ==
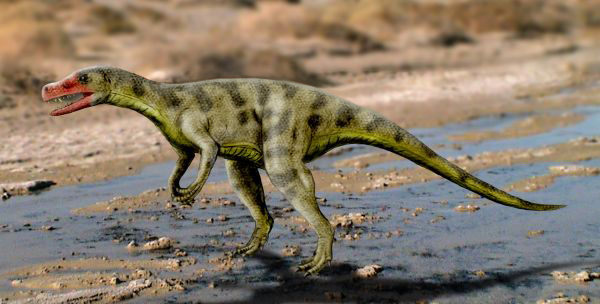
Life restoration

Sanjuansaurus was comparable in size to a medium-sized Herrerasaurus, with a thigh bone that was 395 millimetres (15.6 in) long and a tibia that is 360 millimetres (14 in) in length (in the description paper the tibia is listed with 260 mm in length due to a typo). Alcober and Martinez performed a phylogenetic analysis and found Sanjuansaurus to be a herrerasaurid. It was determined that Sanjuansaurus and Herrerasaurus share many similarities in the morphology of the skull, neck vertebrae, back vertebrae, hip vertebrae, scapula, and the hip bones. Alcober and Martinez observed that Sanjuansaurus and Staurikosaurus share many similarities in the morphology of the hip bones, and the tibia. The pubis of Sanjuansaurus, unlike in other herrerasaurids, points toward the cranium.

=== Distinguishing anatomical features ===
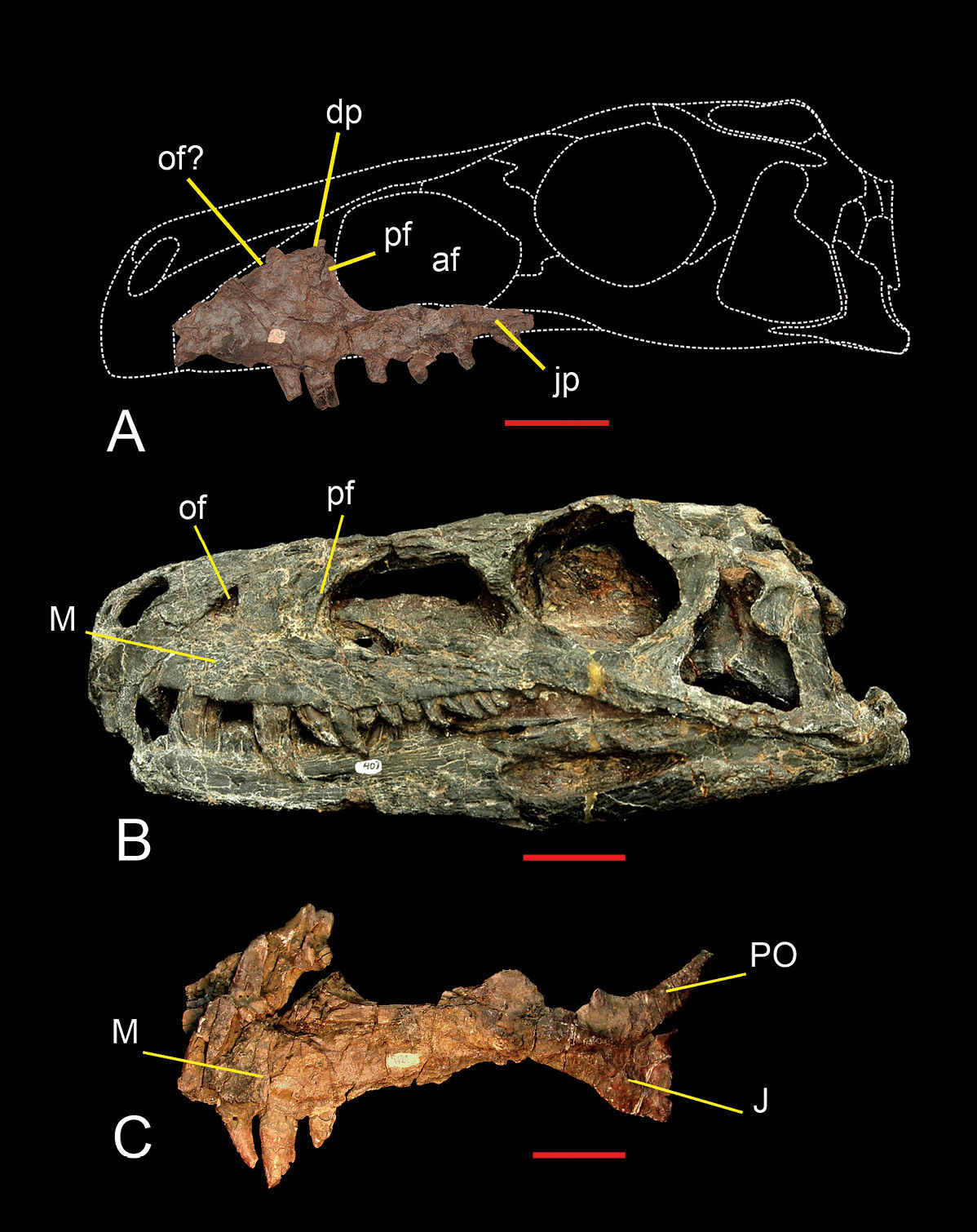
Maxilla of the holotype compared to that of Herrerasaurus

A diagnosis is a statement of the anatomical features of an organism (or group) that collectively distinguish it from all other organisms. Some, but not all, of the features in a diagnosis are also autapomorphies. An autapomorphy is a distinctive anatomical feature that is unique to a given organism or group.

According to Alcober and Martinez (2010), Sanjuansaurus can be distinguished based on the following characteristics:

- the cervical vertebrae have shelf-like, posterolaterally directed transverse processes
- the neural spines of the sixth to eighth dorsal vertebrae, at least, bear acute anterior and posterior processes
- the glenoid has everted lateral margins
- the pubis is relatively short, measuring 63% of the length of the femur
- a pronounced, rugose scar is present on the medial surface of the femur at the level of the fourth trochanter

== Paleoecology ==
=== Fauna and habitat ===
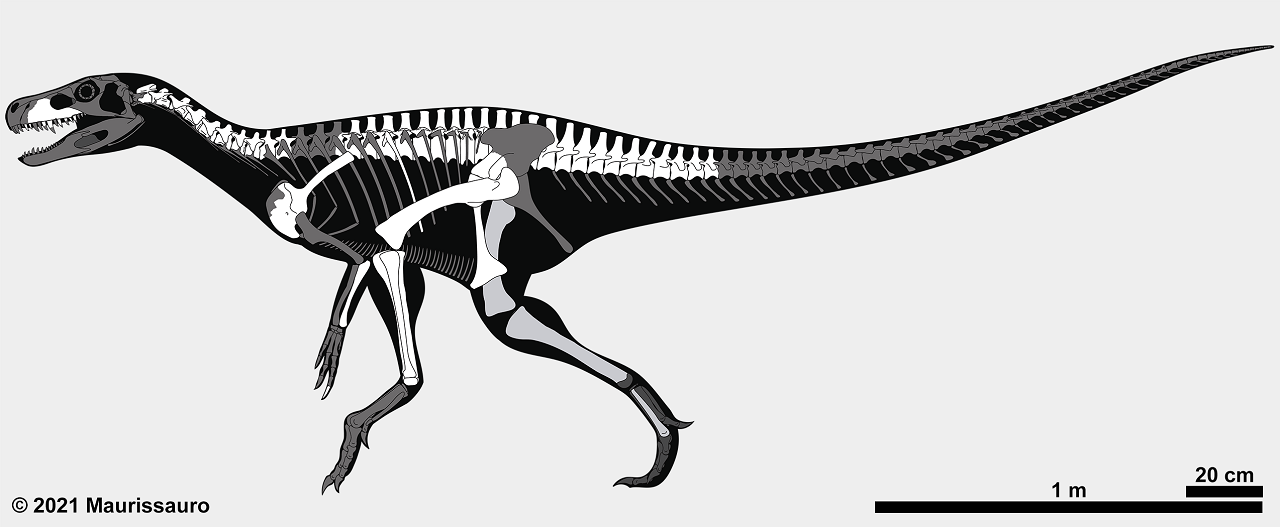
Skeletal diagram showing known elements in white

In the Ischigualasto Formation, dinosaurs constituted only about 6% of the total number of fossils, but by the end of the Triassic Period, dinosaurs were becoming the dominant large land animals, and the other archosaurs and synapsids declined in variety and number.

Studies suggest that the paleoenvironment of the Ischigualasto Formation was a volcanically active floodplain covered by forests and subject to strong seasonal rainfalls. The climate was moist and warm, though subject to seasonal variations. Vegetation consisted of ferns (Cladophlebis), horsetails, and giant conifers (Protojuniperoxylon). These plants formed highland forests along the banks of rivers. Sanjuansaurus lived in the jungles of Late Triassic South America alongside early dinosaurs, Eoraptor, Herrerasaurus, Chromogisaurus, and Panphagia, as well as Saurosuchus, a giant land-living rauisuchian (a quadrupedal meat eater with a theropod-like skull); the broadly similar but smaller Venaticosuchus, an ornithosuchid; and the predatory chiniquodontids. Herbivores were much more abundant than carnivores and were represented by rhynchosaurs such as Hyperodapedon (a beaked reptile); aetosaurs (spiny armored reptiles); kannemeyeriid dicynodonts (stocky, front-heavy beaked quadrupedal animals) such as Ischigualastia; and therapsid traversodontids (somewhat similar in overall form to dicynodonts, but lacking beaks) such as Exaeretodon. These non-dinosaurian herbivores were much more abundant than early ornithischian dinosaurs like Pisanosaurus.
