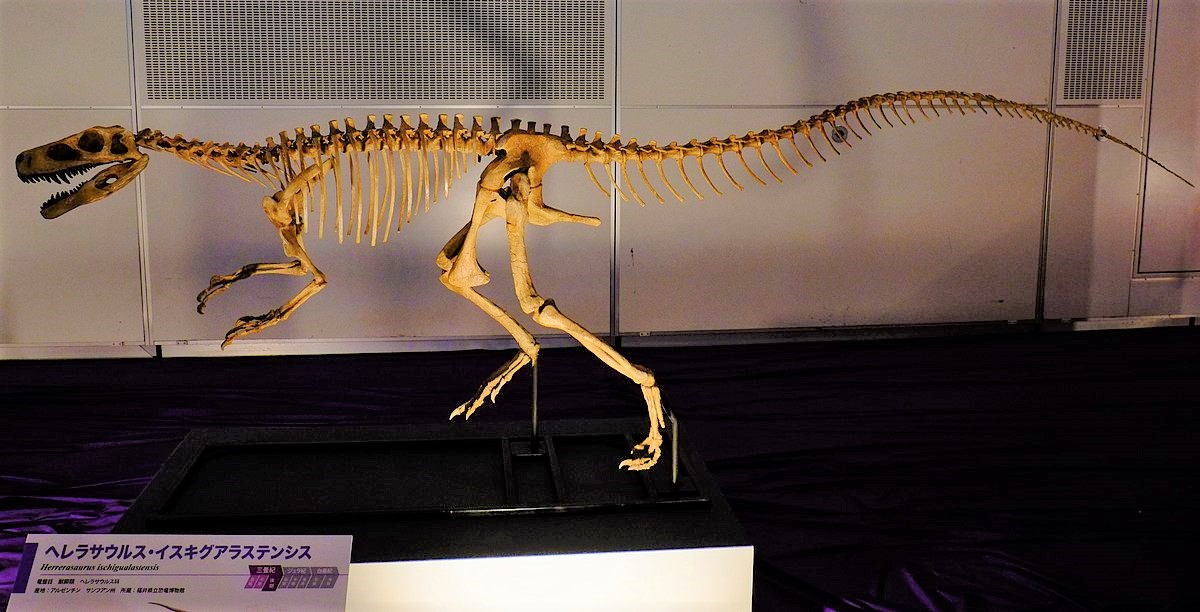
- Reconstructed skeleton in Japan

Scientific classification
- Kingdom: Animalia
- Phylum: Chordata
- Class: Reptilia
- Clade: Dinosauria
- Clade: Saurischia
- Family: †Herrerasauridae
- Genus: †Herrerasaurus; Reig, 1963
- Species: †H. ischigualastensis

Binomial name
- †Herrerasaurus ischigualastensis Reig, 1963

Synonyms
- Ischisaurus cattoi Reig, 1963; Frenguellisaurus ischigualastensis Novas, 1986

= Herrerasaurus =

Herrerasaurus Temporal range: Late Triassic (Carnian), 231.4–228.91 Ma

Extinct genus of dinosaurs

Herrerasaurus is likely a genus of saurischian dinosaur from the Late Triassic period. Measuring 6 m (20 ft) long and weighing around 350 kg (770 lb), this genus was one of the earliest dinosaurs from the fossil record. Its name means "Herrera's lizard", after the rancher who discovered the first specimen in 1958 in South America. All known fossils of this carnivore have been discovered in the Ischigualasto Formation of Carnian age (late Triassic according to the ICS, dated to 231.4 million years ago) in northwestern Argentina. The type species, Herrerasaurus ischigualastensis, was described by Osvaldo Reig in 1963 and is the only species assigned to the genus. Ischisaurus and Frenguellisaurus are synonyms.

For many years, the classification of Herrerasaurus was unclear because it was known from very fragmentary remains. It was hypothesized to be a basal theropod, a basal sauropodomorph, a basal saurischian, or not a dinosaur at all but another type of archosaur. However, with the discovery of an almost complete skeleton and skull in 1988, Herrerasaurus has been classified as an early saurischian in most of the phylogenies on the origin and early evolution of dinosaurs. It is a member of the Herrerasauridae, a family of similar genera that were among the earliest of the dinosaurian evolutionary radiation.

== Discovery ==
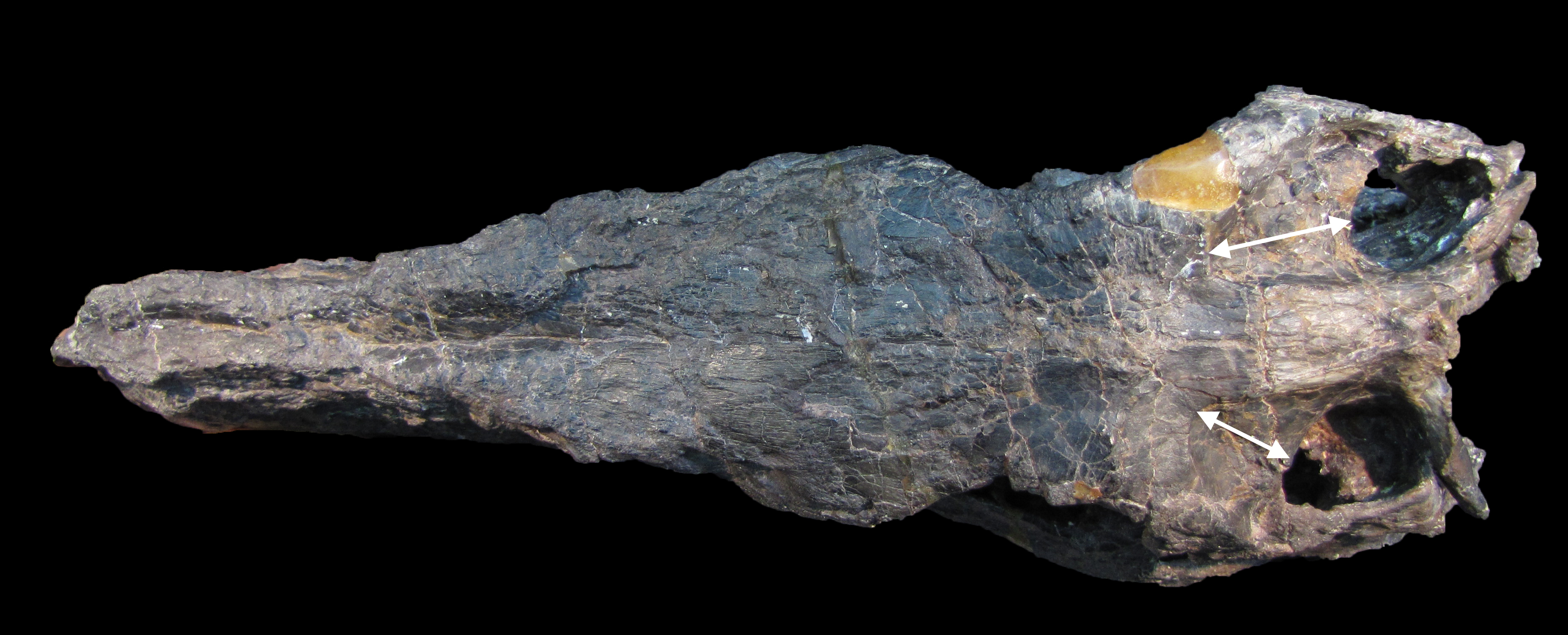
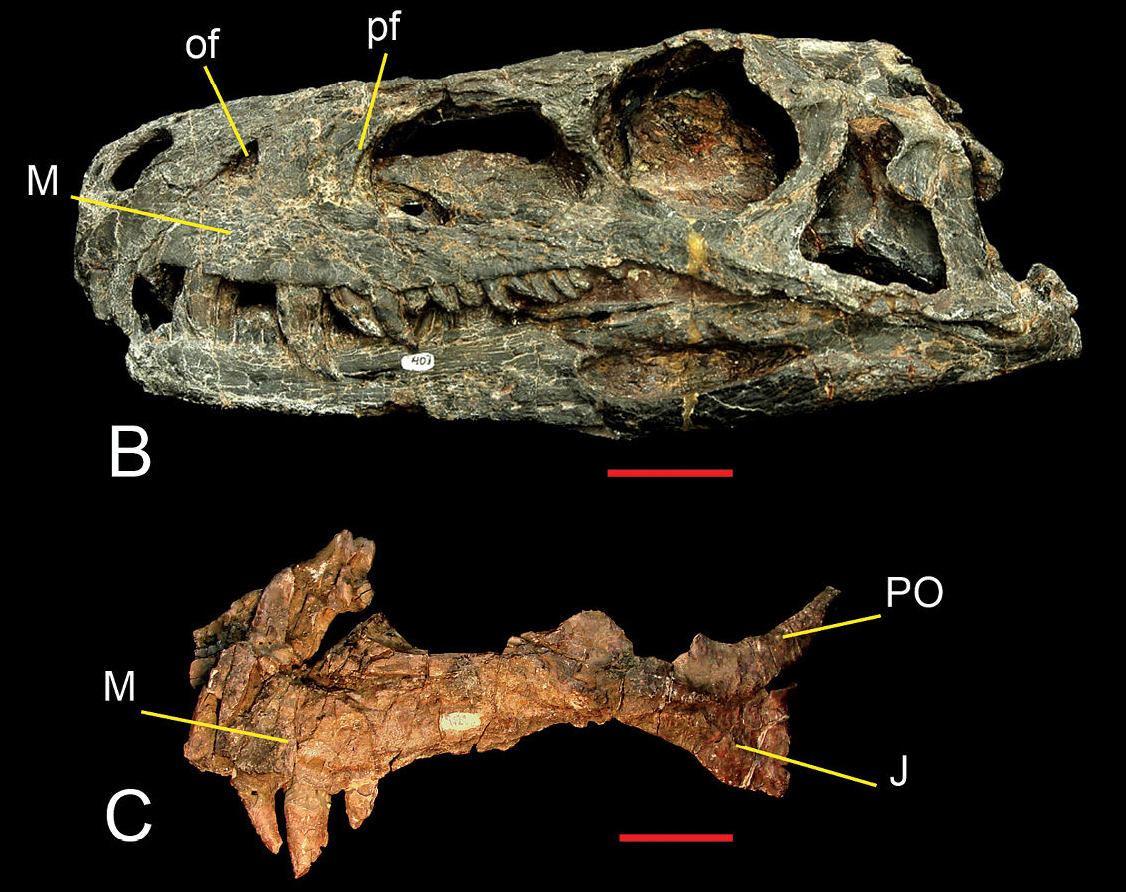
The most complete skull, specimen PVSJ 407, and left maxilla PVSJ 053

Herrerasaurus was named by paleontologist Osvaldo Reig after Victorino Herrera, an Andean goatherd who first noticed its fossils in outcrops near the city of San Juan, Argentina, in 1959. These rocks, which later yielded Eoraptor, are part of the Ischigualasto Formation and date from the late Carnian stage of the Late Triassic period. Reig named a second dinosaur from these rocks in the same publication as Herrerasaurus; this dinosaur, Ischisaurus cattoi, is now considered a junior synonym and a juvenile of Herrerasaurus.

Reig believed Herrerasaurus was an early example of a carnosaur, but this was the subject of much debate over the next 30 years, and the genus was variously classified during that time. In 1970, Steel classified Herrerasaurus as a prosauropod. In 1972, Peter Galton classified the genus as not diagnosable beyond Saurischia. Later, using cladistic analysis, some researchers put Herrerasaurus and Staurikosaurus at the base of the dinosaur tree before the separation between ornithischians and saurischians. Several researchers classified the remains as non-dinosaurian.

Two other partial skeletons with skull material were named Frenguellisaurus ischigualastensis by Fernando Novas in 1986, but this species, too, is now thought to be a synonym. Frenguellisaurus ischigualastensis was discovered in 1975 and was described by Novas (1986), who considered it a primitive saurischian and possibly a theropod. Novas (1992) and Sereno and Novas (1992) examined the Frenguellisaurus remains and found them referable to Herrerasaurus. Ischisaurus cattoi was discovered in 1960 and described by Reig in 1963. Novas (1992) and Sereno and Novas (1992) reviewed its remains and found them also to be referable to Herrerasaurus.

A complete Herrerasaurus skull was found in 1988 by a team of paleontologists led by Paul Sereno. Based on the new fossils, authors such as Thomas Holtz and José Bonaparte classified Herrerasaurus at the base of the saurischian tree before the divergence between prosauropods and theropods. However, Sereno favored classifying Herrerasaurus (and the Herrerasauridae) as primitive theropods. These two classifications have become the most persistent, with Rauhut (2003) and Bittencourt and Kellner (2004) favoring the early theropod hypothesis, and Max Langer (2004), Langer and Benton (2006), and Randall Irmis and his coauthors (2007) favoring the basal saurischian hypothesis. If Herrerasaurus were indeed a theropod, it would indicate that theropods, sauropodomorphs, and ornithischians diverged even earlier than herrerasaurids, before the middle Carnian, and that "all three lineages independently evolved several dinosaurian features, such as a more advanced ankle joint or an open acetabulum". This view is further supported by ichnological records showing large tridactyl (three-toed) footprints that can be attributed only to a theropod dinosaur. These footprints date from the early Carnian Los Rastros Formation in Argentina, which predates Herrerasaurus by several million years.

The study of early dinosaurs such as Herrerasaurus and Eoraptor, therefore, has important implications for the concept of dinosaurs as a monophyletic group (a group descended from a common ancestor). The monophyly of dinosaurs was explicitly proposed in the 1970s by Galton and Robert T. Bakker, who compiled a list of cranial and postcranial synapomorphies (common anatomical traits derived from the common ancestor). Later authors proposed additional synapomorphies. An extensive study of Herrerasaurus by Sereno in 1992 suggested that of these proposed synapomorphies, only one cranial and seven postcranial features were actually derived from a common ancestor and that the others were attributable to convergent evolution. Sereno's analysis of Herrerasaurus also led him to propose several new dinosaurian synapomorphies.

== Description ==
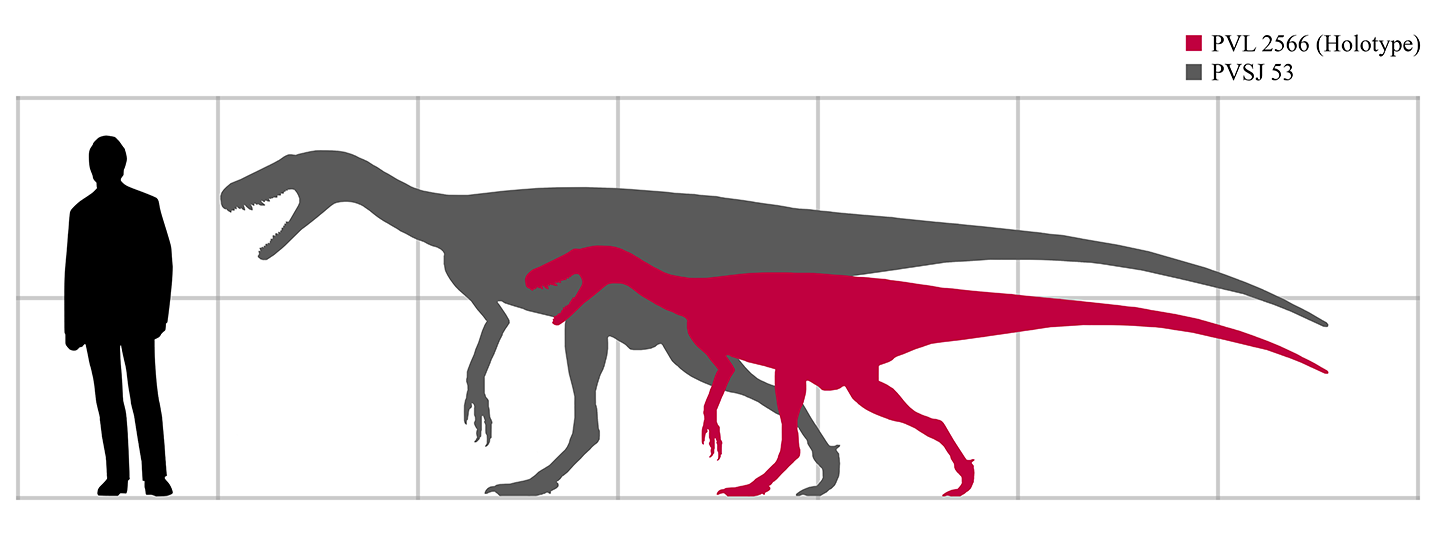
Scale diagram showing the holotype specimen (red) and the largest-known specimen (gray), compared in size with a human

Herrerasaurus was a lightly built bipedal carnivore with a long tail and a relatively small head. Adults had skulls up to 56 cm (22 in) long and were up to 6 m (20 ft) in total length and 350 kg (770 lb) in weight. Smaller specimens were about 4.5 m (15 ft) long and weighed about 200 kg (440 lb).

Herrerasaurus was fully bipedal. It had strong hind limbs with short thighs and rather long feet, indicating that it was likely a swift runner. The foot had five toes, but only the middle three (digits II, III, and IV) bore weight. The outer toes (I and V) were small; the first toe had a small claw. The tail, partially stiffened by overlapping vertebral projections, balanced the body and was also an adaptation for speed. The forelimbs of Herrerasaurus were less than half the length of its hind limbs. The upper arm and forearm were rather short, while the manus (hand) was elongated. The first two fingers and the thumb ended in curved, sharp claws for grasping prey. The fourth and fifth digits were small stubs without claws.

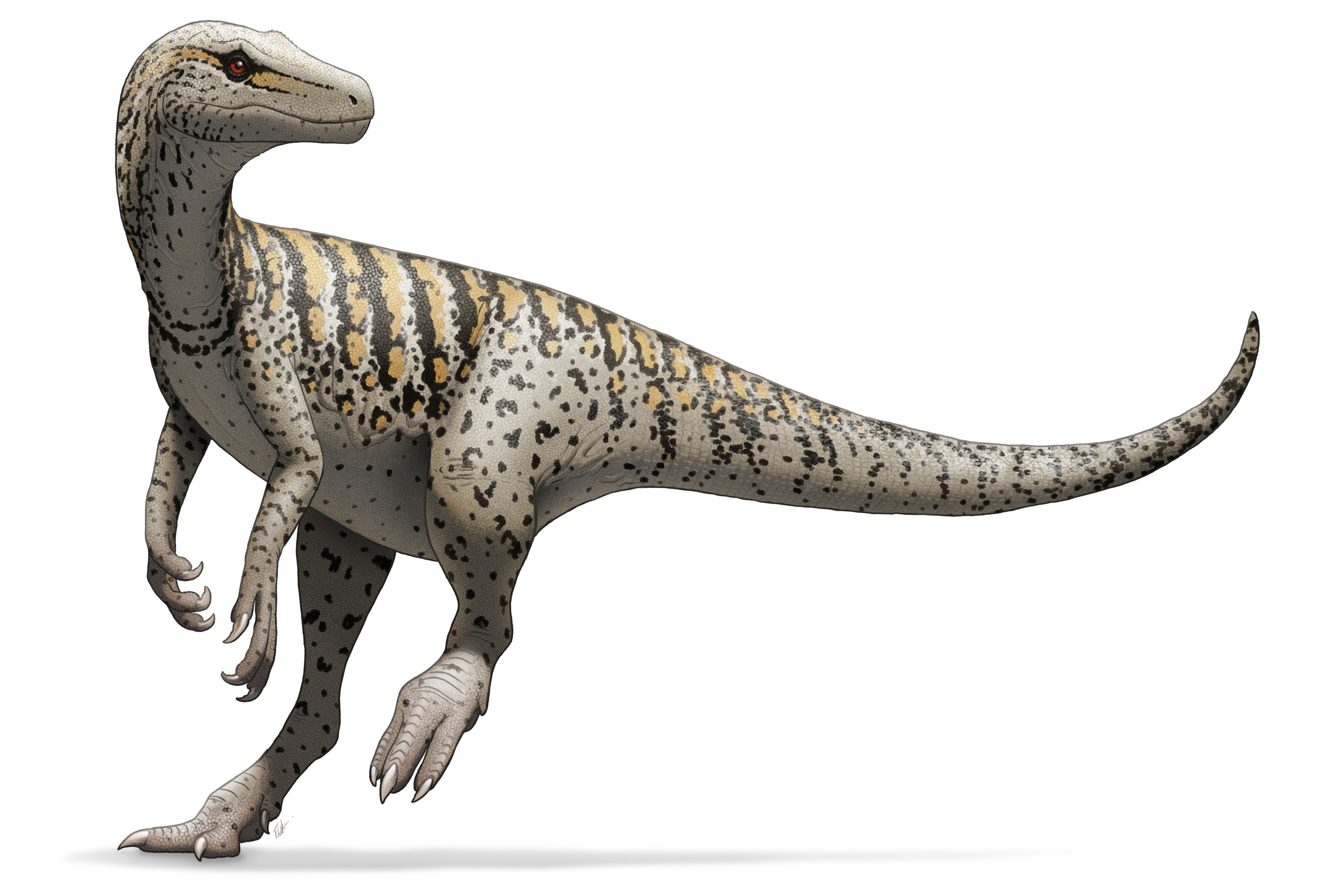
Life restoration

Herrerasaurus displays traits that are found in different groups of dinosaurs, and several traits found in non-dinosaurian archosaurs. Although it shares most of the characteristics of dinosaurs, there are a few differences, particularly in the shape of its hip and leg bones. Its pelvis is like that of saurischian dinosaurs, but it has a bony acetabulum (where the femur meets the pelvis) that was only partially open. The ilium, the main hip bone, is supported by only two sacrals, a basal trait. However, the pubis points backwards, a derived trait as seen in dromaeosaurids and birds. Additionally, the end of the pubis has a booted shape, like those in avetheropods; and the vertebral centra have an hourglass shape as found in Allosaurus.

Herrerasaurus had a long, narrow skull that lacked nearly all the specializations that characterized later dinosaurs, and more closely resembled those of more primitive archosaurs such as Euparkeria. It had five pairs of fenestrae (skull openings) in its skull, two pairs of which were for the eyes and nostrils. Between the eyes and the nostrils were two antorbital fenestrae and a pair of tiny, 1-centimeter-long (0.39 in) slit-like holes called promaxillary fenestrae.

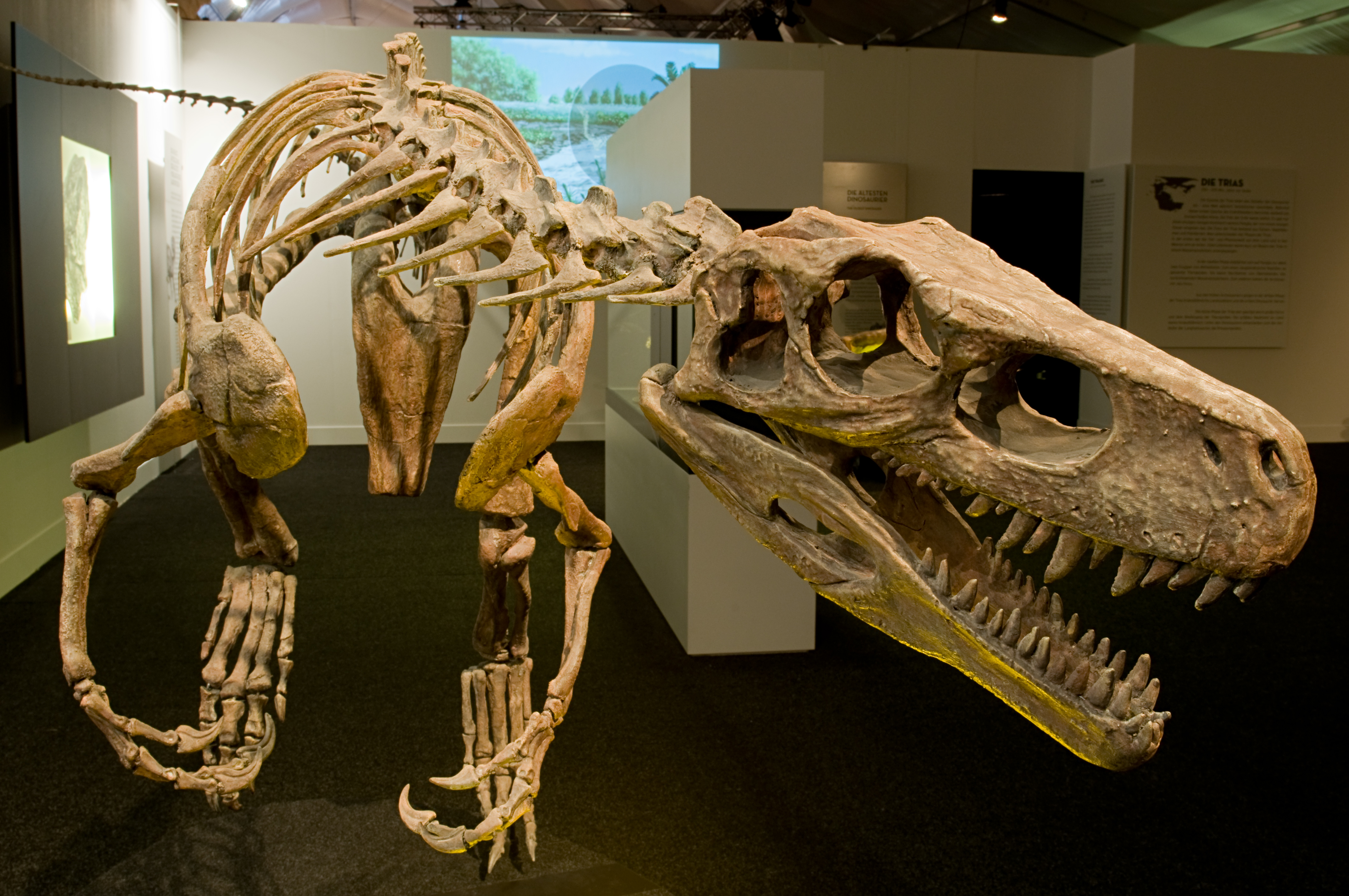
Reconstructed skeleton in Naturmuseum Senckenberg

Herrerasaurus had a flexible joint in the lower jaw that could slide back and forth to deliver a grasping bite. This cranial specialization is unusual among dinosaurs but has evolved independently in some lizards. The rear of the lower jaw also had fenestrae. The jaws were equipped with large serrated teeth for biting and eating flesh, and the neck was slender and flexible.

According to Novas (1993), Herrerasaurus can be distinguished based on the following features: the presence of a premaxilla-maxilla fenestra, and the dorsal part of laterotemporal fenestra is less than a third as wide as the ventral part; the presence of a ridge on the lateral surface of the jugal bone, and a deeply incised supratemporal fossa that extends across the medial postorbital process; the subquadrate ventral squamosal process has a lateral depression, and the quadratojugal bone overlaps the posterodorsal quadrate face; the pterygoid process of the quadrate has an inturned, trough-shaped ventral margin, and the presence of a slender ribbed posterodorsal dentary process; the surangular bone has a forked anterior process for articulation with the posterodorsal dentary process; the humerus' internal tuberosity is proximally projected and separated from the humeral head by a deep groove (also present in coelophysoids); possesses enlarged hands, which are 60% of the size of the humerus+radius, and the humeral entepicondyle is ridge-like with anterior and posterior depressions; and the posterior border of the ilial peduncle forms a right angle with the dorsal border of the shaft on the ischium.

According to Sereno (1993), Herrerasaurus can be distinguished based on the following features, all of which are unknown in other herrerasaurids: a circular pit is present on the humeral ectepicondyle, a feature also present in Saturnalia; a saddle-shaped ulnar condyle of the humerus, and the articular surface for the ulnare on the ulna is convex; the articular surface of the ulnare is smaller than that of the ulna, a feature unknown in Staurikosaurus and Sanjuansaurus; the centrale is placed distal to the radiale; a broad subnarial process of the premaxilla, and a broad supratemporal depression (noted by Sereno and Novas, 1993); the basal tuber and the occipital condyle are subequal in width (noted by Sereno and Novas, 1993).

== Classification ==
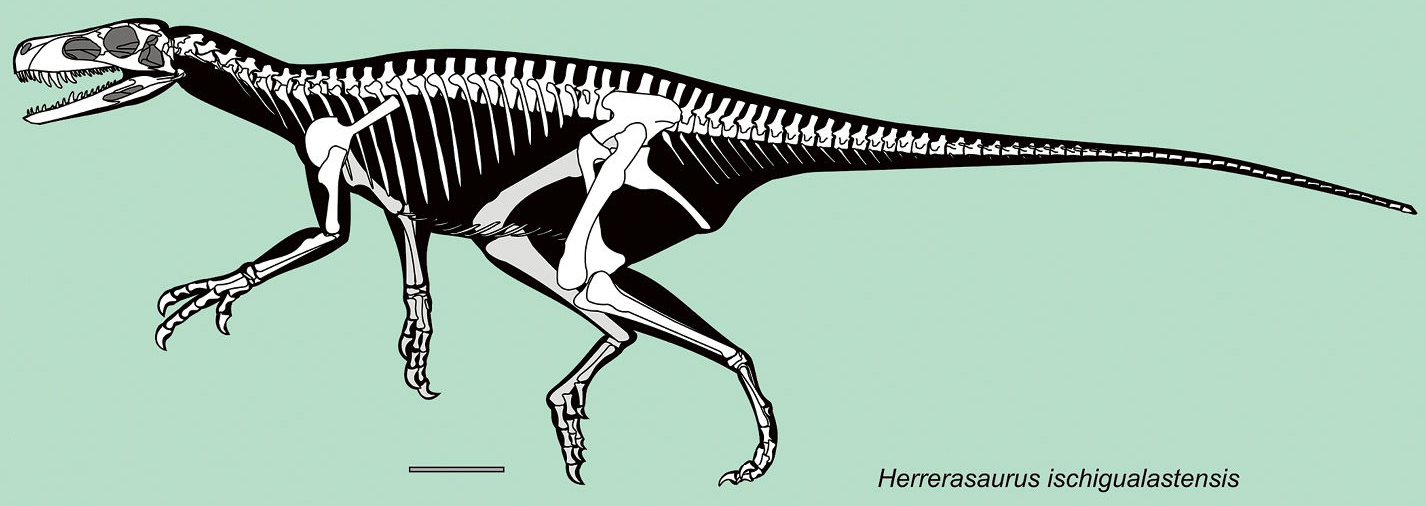
Skeletal diagram

Herrerasaurus was originally considered to be a genus within Carnosauria, which then included forms similar to Megalosaurus and Antrodemus (the latter is probably equivalent to Allosaurus), even though Herrerasaurus lived many millions of years before them and therefore would have retained multiple primitive features. This carnosaurian classification was amended upon by Rozhdestvensky and Tatarinov in 1964, who classified Herrerasaurus within the family Gryponichidae inside Carnosauria. The same year, Walker published a differing opinion that Herrerasaurus instead was allied with Plateosauridae, although it differed in possessing a pubic boot. Walker also proposed that Herrerasaurus may instead be close to Poposaurus (now considered a pseudosuchian) and the unnamed theropod from the Dockum Group of Texas (now assigned to the rauisuchian Postosuchus). In 1985, Charig noted that Herrerasaurus was of uncertain classification, showing similarities to both "prosauropods" and "carnosaurians". Romer (1966), simply noted that Herrerasaurus was a prosauropod possibly within Plateosauridae. In the description of Staurikosaurus, Colbert noted that there were many similarities between his taxon and Herrerasaurus, but classified them in separate families, with Herrerasaurus in Teratosauridae. In 1970, Bonaparte also proposed similarities between Herrerasaurus and Staurikosaurus, and while classifying them both clearly as in Saurischia, he stated that they appeared as though they could not be placed in a current family. This was further supported by Benedetto in 1973, who named for the taxa the new family Herrerasauridae, which he classified as saurischians, possibly within Theropoda but not in Sauropodomorpha. However, in 1977 Galton proposed that Herrerasauridae only included Herrerasaurus, and found it to be Saurischian incertae sedis.

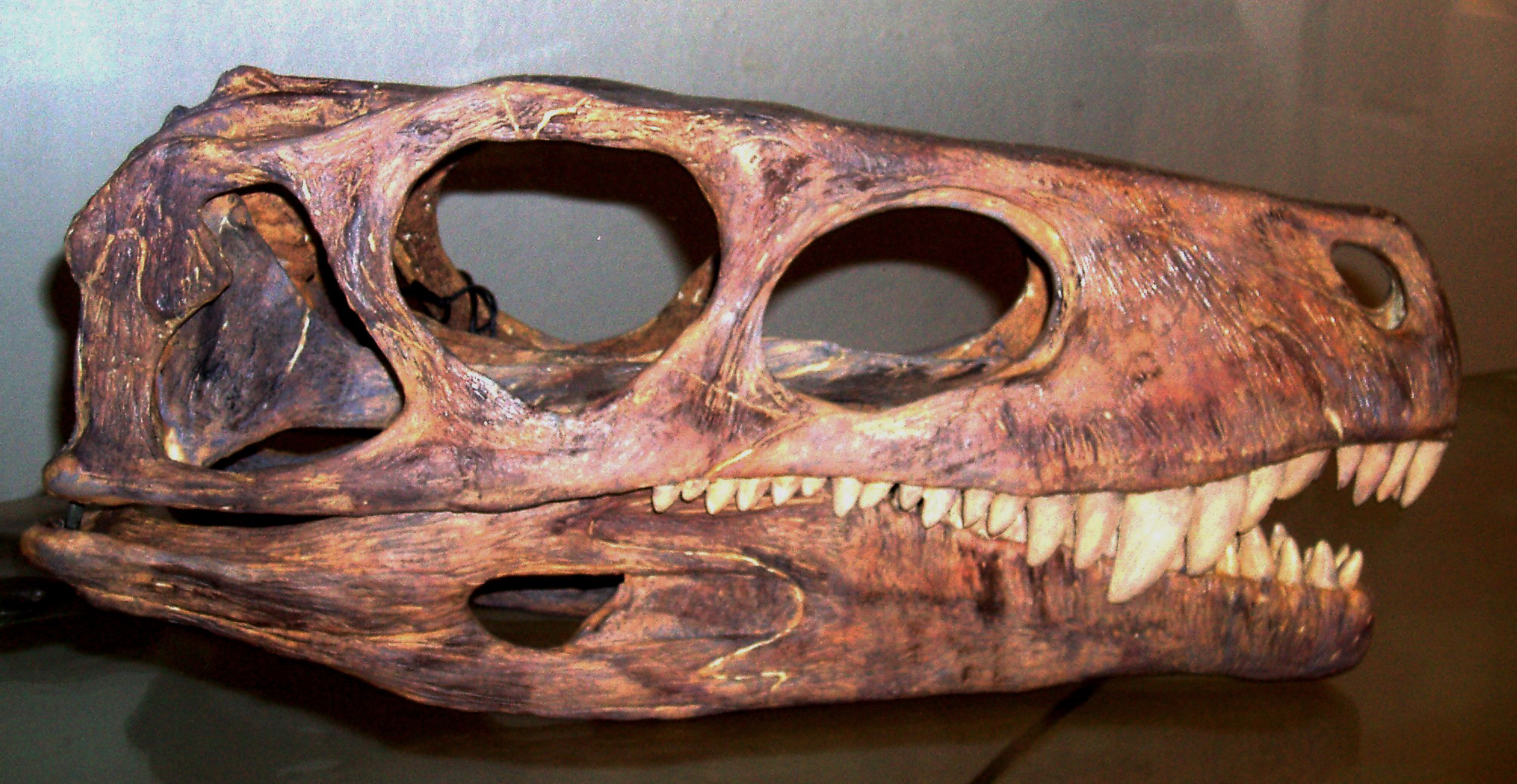
Reconstructed skull in the Natural History Museum in Milan

Proposed in 1987 by Brinkman and Sues, Herrerasaurus has at times been considered basal to Ornithischia and Saurischia, although Brinkmann and Sues still considered it to be inside Dinosauria. They supported this on the basis that Herrerasaurus has a large pedal digit V, and has a well developed medial wall on the acetabulum. Brinkmann and Sues considered Staurikosaurus and Herrerasaurus to not form a true group called Herrerasauridae, and that instead they were successively more primitive forms. Also, they considered the characters used by Benedetto to be invalid, instead representing only the plesiomorphic state that was found in both taxa. This was disagreed with in 1992 by Novas, who stated many derived synapomorphies of Herrerasauridae, such as a distinct pubic boot, but still classified them as basal to Ornithischia and Saurischia. Novas defined the family as the least common ancestor of Herrerasaurus and Staurikosaurus and all its descendants. A differing definition of Herrerasauridae as the most inclusive clade including Herrerasaurus but not Passer domesticus was first suggested by Sereno (1998), and more closely follows the original inclusion proposed by Benedetto. Another group, Herrerasauria was named by Galton in 1985, and defined as Herrerasaurus but not Liliensternus or Plateosaurus by Langer (2004), who used the node-based definition for Herrerasauridae.

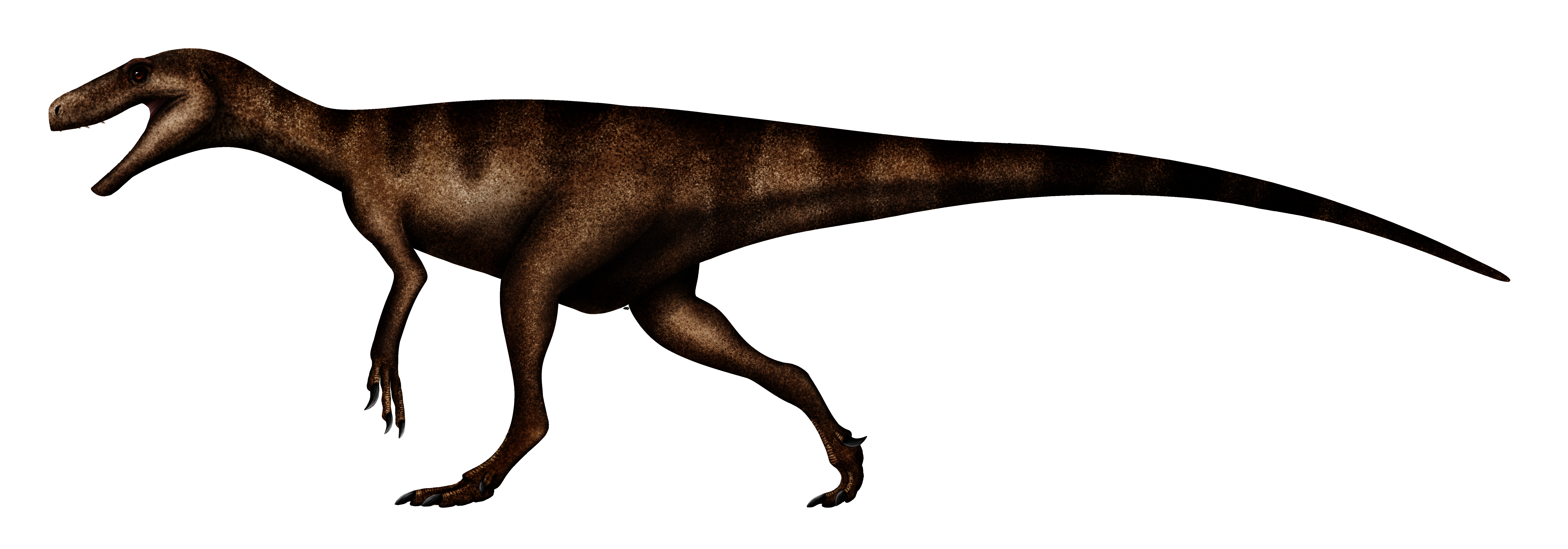
Life restoration

In a revision of basal Dinosauria, Padian and May (1993) discussed the definition of the clade, and redefined it as the latest common ancestor of Triceratops and birds. They also discussed what this definition would do to the most basal taxa, such as Herrerasauridae, and Eoraptor. Padian and May considered that since both Herrerasauridae and Eoraptor lack many diagnostic features of Saurischia or Ornithischia, that they could not be considered inside Dinosauria.

A later 1994 study by Novas instead classified Herrerasaurus within Dinosauria, and strongly supported its position within Saurischia, as well as provided synapomorphies that it shared with Theropoda. Novas found that the primitive features of lacking a brevis fossa and having only two sacral vertebrae were simply reversals found in the genus. In 1996, Novas went further by supporting a theropod position for Herrerasaurus with a phylogenetic analysis, which placed it closer to Neotheropoda than Eoraptor or Sauropodomorpha. Langer (2004) mentioned that this hypothesis was widely accepted, but that more later authors instead preferred to place Herrerasaurus as well as Eoraptor basal to Theropoda and Sauropodomorpha, a clade called Eusaurischia. Langer (2004) conducted a phylogenetic analysis, and found that it was much more likely that Herrerasaurus was a basal saurischian, than either a theropod or a non-dinosaurian. Langer's proposal was supported by multiple studies until the discovery of Tawa, when Nesbitt et al. conducted a more inclusive analysis, and the resulting cladogram placed Herrerasauridae basal to Eoraptor, but closer to Dilophosaurus than Sauropodomorpha. Unlike Nesbitt, Ezcurra (2010) conducted a phylogenetic analysis to place his new taxon Chromogisaurus, and found that Herrerasauridae was basal to Eusaurischia.

In 2010, Alcocer and Martinez described a new taxon of herrerasaurid, Sanjuansaurus. It could be distinguished from Herrerasaurus based on multiple features. In the phylogenetic analysis, Herrerasaurus, Sanjuansaurus and Staurikosaurus all were in a polytomy, and Herrerasauridae was the most primitive group of saurischian, outside Eusaurischia, Eoraptor and Guaibasaurus. In 2011, Martinez et al. described Eodromaeus, a basal theropod from the same formation as Herrerasaurus. In a phylogenetic analysis, Eoraptor was placed within Sauropodomorpha, Herrerasauridae was placed as the most basal theropods, and Eodromaeus was placed as the next most basal. A more recent analysis, by Bittencourt et al. (2014), placed Herrerasauridae in a polytomy with Theropoda and Sauropodomorpha, with Eoraptor also being in an unresolved position. This cladogram is shown below.

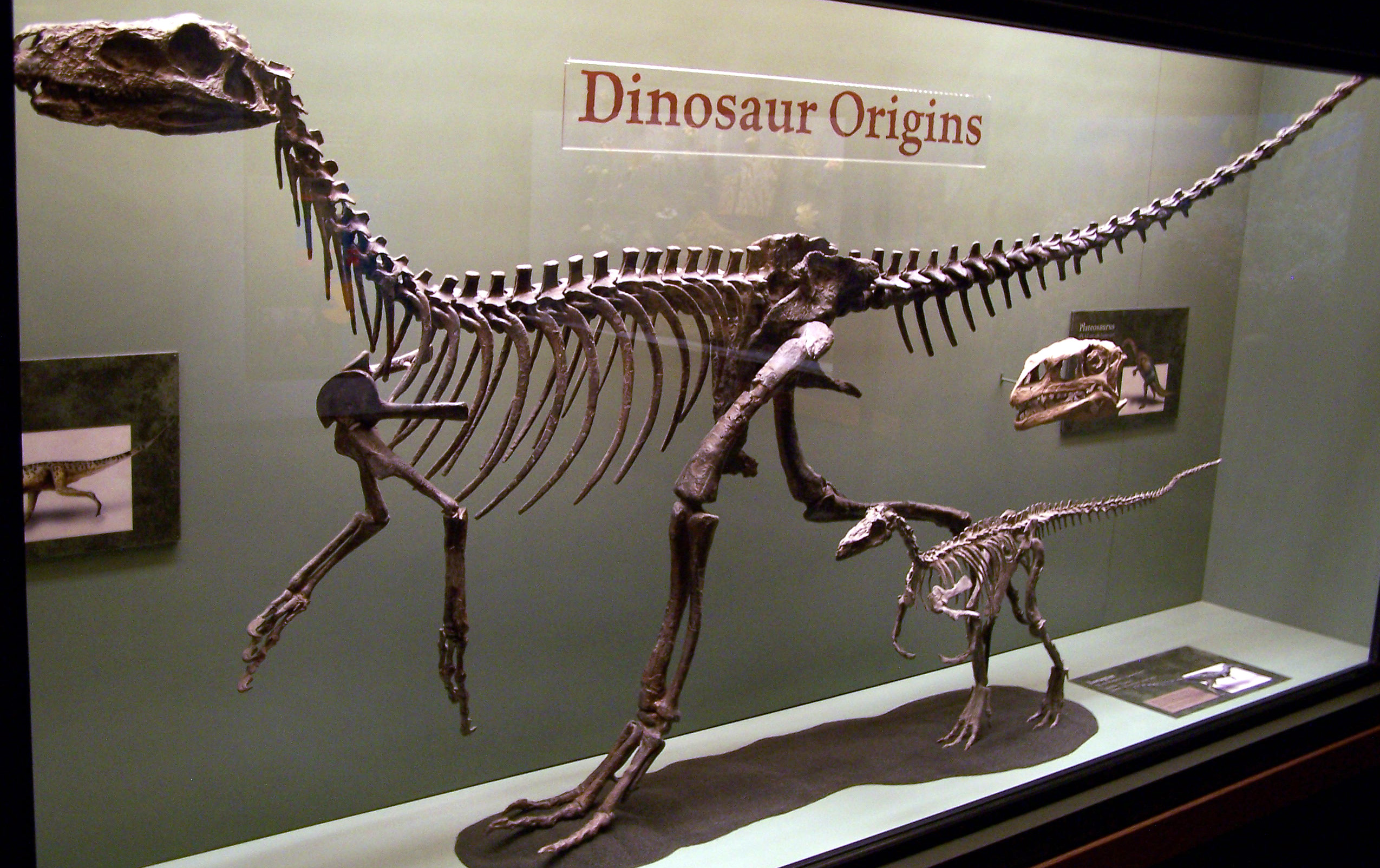
Herrerasaurus (large), Eoraptor (small), and Plateosaurus (skull), three early saurischians

- Dinosauria
  - Ornithischia
  - Saurischia
    - Eoraptor
    - Sauropodomorpha
    - Herrerasauridae
      - Staurikosaurus
      - - Herrerasaurus
        - Sanjuansaurus
    - Theropoda
      - Eodromaeus
      - Tawa
      - Neotheropoda

Other members of the clade may include Chindesaurus from the Upper Petrified Forest (Chinle Formation) of Arizona, and possibly Caseosaurus from the Tecovas Formation of the Dockum Group in Texas, although the relationships of these animals are not fully understood, and not all paleontologists agree. Other possible basal theropods, Alwalkeria from the Late Triassic Lower Maleri Formation of India, and Teyuwasu, known from very fragmentary remains from the Late Triassic of Brazil, might be related. Paul (1988) noted that it had been incorrectly suggested that Staurikosaurus pricei was a juvenile Herrerasaurus. This claim was refuted when pelvic bones from a juvenile Herrerasaurus were discovered, which upon examination did not resemble the pelvic bones of Staurikosaurus.

== Paleobiology ==
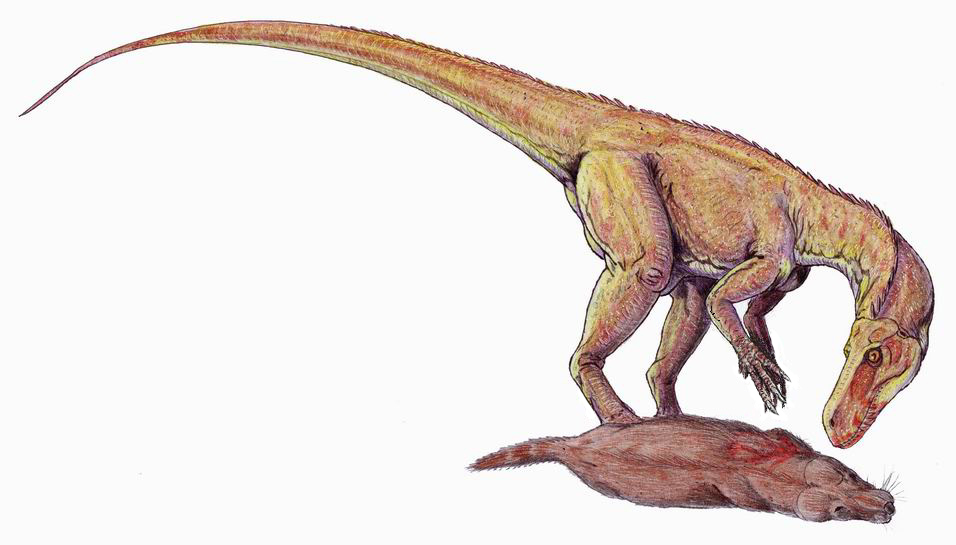
An artist's impression of Herrerasaurus feeding on a small cynodont

The teeth of Herrerasaurus indicate that it was a carnivore; its size indicates it would have preyed upon small and medium-sized plant eaters. These might have included other dinosaurs, such as Pisanosaurus, as well as the more plentiful rhynchosaurs and synapsids. The similarity of its dental microwear patterns to those of modern slender-snouted crocodylians and small-bodied broad-snouted crocodylians, however, indicates that Herrerasaurus may have mainly consumed small prey that could have been swallowed whole with very minimal or no oral processing, although the authors of the study concluding this caution that this may be due to the small sample size of Herrerasaurus teeth that underwent dental microwear texture analysis in the study. Herrerasaurus itself may have been preyed upon by giant "rauisuchians" (loricatans) like Saurosuchus; puncture wounds were found in one skull.

Coprolites (fossilized dung) containing small bones but no trace of plant fragments, discovered in the Ischigualasto Formation, have been assigned to Herrerasaurus based on fossil abundance. Mineralogical and chemical analysis of these coprolites indicates that if the referral to Herrerasaurus was correct, this carnivore could digest bone.

Comparisons between the scleral rings of Herrerasaurus and modern birds and reptiles suggest that it may have been cathemeral, active throughout the day at short intervals.

In a 2001 study conducted by Bruce Rothschild and other paleontologists, 12 hand bones and 20 foot bones referred to Herrerasaurus were examined for signs of stress fracture, but none were found.

PVSJ 407, a Herrerasaurus ischigualastensis, had a pit in a skull bone attributed by Paul Sereno and Novas to a bite. Two additional pits occurred on the splenial. The areas around these pits are swollen and porous, suggesting the wounds were afflicted by a short-lived non-lethal infection. Because of the size and angles of the wound, it is likely that they were obtained in a fight with another Herrerasaurus.

== Paleoecology ==
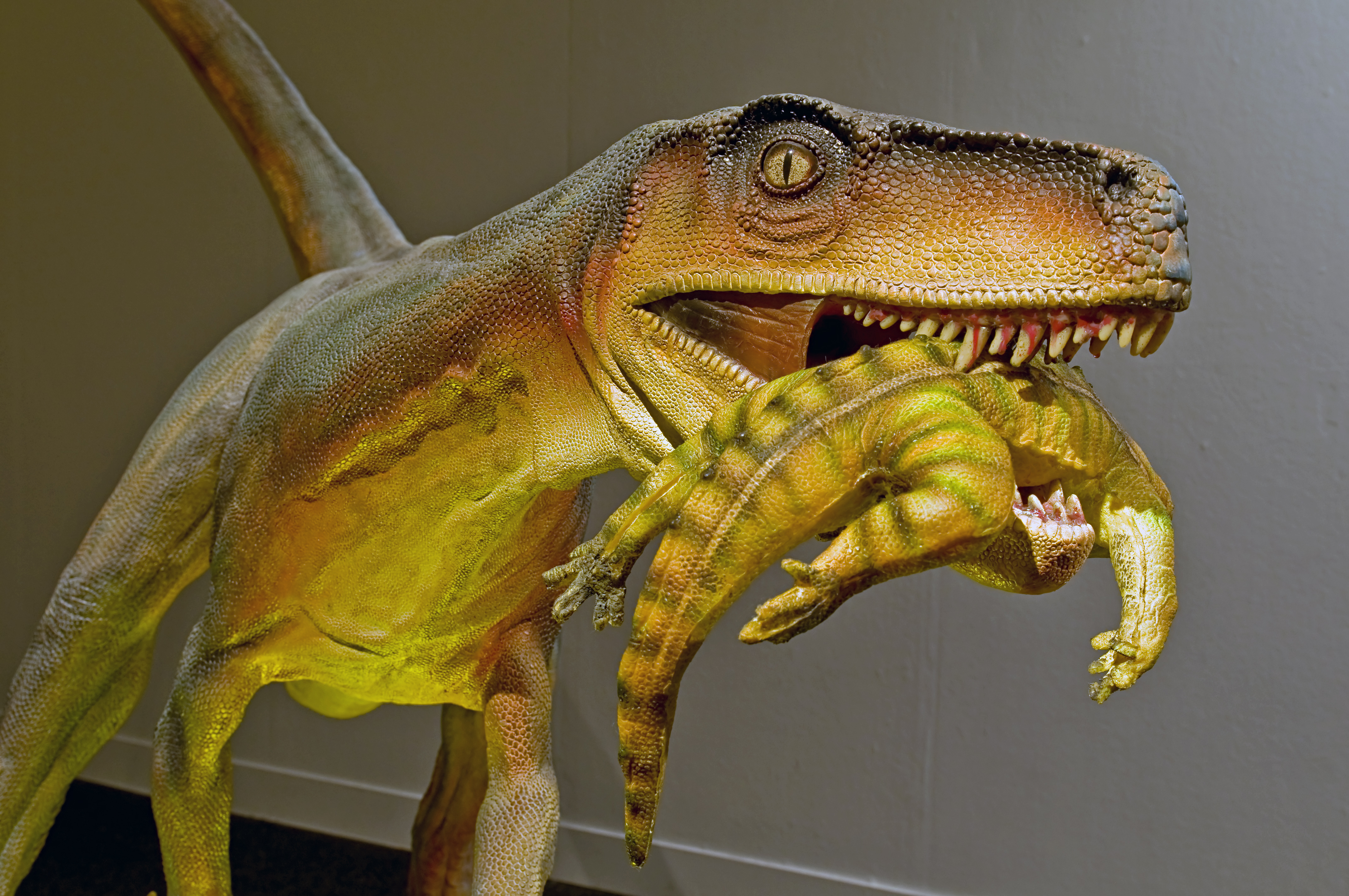
Model depicted with prey

The holotype of Herrerasaurus (PVL 2566) was discovered in the Cancha de Bochas Member of the Ischigualasto Formation in San Juan, Argentina. It was collected in 1961 by Victorino Herrera, in sediments that were deposited in the Carnian stage of the Triassic period, approximately 231 to 229 million years ago. Over the years, the Ischigualasto Formation produced other fossils ultimately referred to Herrerasaurus. In 1958, A.S. Romer discovered specimen MCZ 7063, originally referred to Staurikosaurus in Carnian sediments. Herrerasaurus specimens PVL 2045 and MLP(4)61, were collected in 1959 and 1960, respectively, in sediments that were deposited in the Norian stage of the Triassic period, approximately 228 to 208 million years ago. However, these specimens are no longer regarded as pertaining to Herrerasaurus. In 1960, Scaglia collected specimen MACN 18.060, originally the holotype of Ischisaurus cattoi, in sediments deposited in the Carnian stage. In 1961, Scaglia collected Herrerasaurus specimen PVL 2558, in the Carnian beds of this formation. In 1990, the Cancha de Bochas Member produced more Herrerasaurus specimens, also from its Carnian beds. Specimen PVSJ 53, originally the holotype of Frenguellisaurus ischigualastensis, was collected by Gargiulo & Oñate in 1975 in sediments that were deposited in the Carnian stage.

Although Herrerasaurus shared the body shape of the large carnivorous dinosaurs, it lived during a time when dinosaurs were small and few. It was the time of non-dinosaurian reptiles, not dinosaurs, and a major turning point in the Earth's ecology. The vertebrate fauna of the Ischigualasto Formation and the slightly later Los Colorados Formation consisted mainly of a variety of crurotarsal archosaurs and synapsids. In the Ischigualasto Formation, dinosaurs constituted only about 10% of the total number of fossils, but by the end of the Triassic Period, dinosaurs were becoming the dominant large land animals, and the other archosaurs and synapsids declined in variety and number.

Studies suggest that the paleoenvironment of the Ischigualasto Formation was a volcanically active floodplain covered by forests and subject to strong seasonal rainfalls. The climate was moist and warm, though subject to seasonal variations. Vegetation consisted of ferns (Cladophlebis), horsetails, and giant conifers (Protojuniperoxylon). These plants formed lowland forests along the banks of rivers. Herrerasaurus remains appear to have been the most common among the carnivores of the Ischigualasto Formation. It lived in the jungles of Late Triassic South America alongside other early dinosaurs, such as Sanjuansaurus, Eoraptor, Panphagia, and Chromogisaurus, as well as rhynchosaurs (Scaphonyx), cynodonts (e.g., Exaeretodon, Ecteninion and Chiniquodon), dicynodonts (Ischigualastia), pseudosuchians (e.g., Saurosuchus, Sillosuchus and Aetosauroides), proterochampsids (e.g., Proterochampsa) and temnospondyls (Pelorocephalus).
