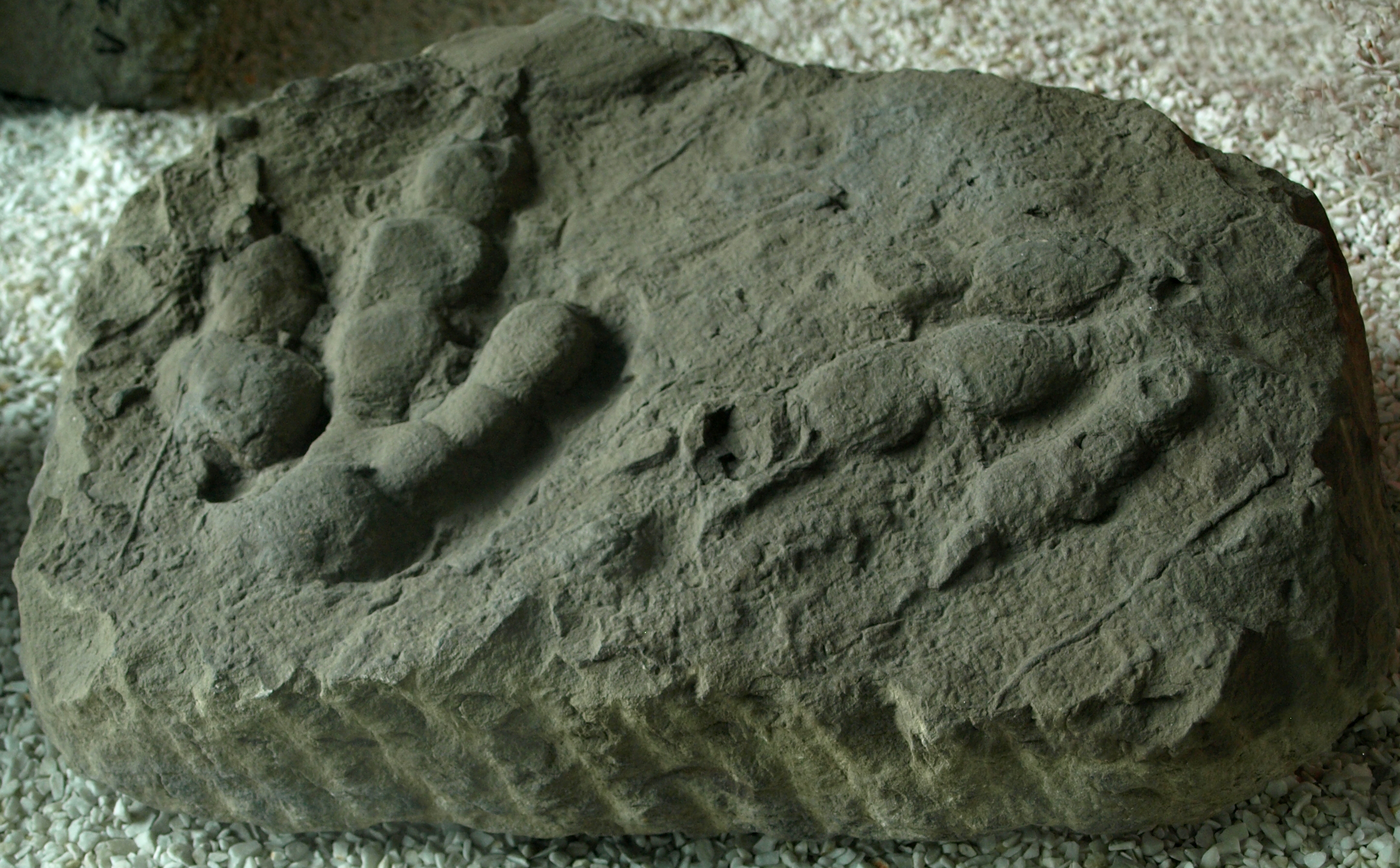
- Footprints of Jialingpus yuechiensis

Trace fossil classification
- Domain: Eukaryota
- Kingdom: Animalia
- Phylum: Chordata
- Clade: Dinosauria
- Clade: Saurischia
- Clade: Theropoda
- Ichnogenus: †Jialingpus; Zhen, Li & Zhen, 1983

Type ichnospecies
- †Jialingpus yuechiensis Zhen et al., 1983

= Jialingpus =

Jialingpus Temporal range: Oxfordian - Cenomanian 161–99.7 Ma

Dinosaur footprint

Jialingpus is an ichnogenus of dinosaur, likely a theropod. Its footprints have been found in the Feitianshan Formation, a low-energy lake formation. Holotype is SCFP-24, which was found in Late Jurassic (Oxfordian)-aged Yuechi tracksite at Huanglong, China. These footprints were found within the vicinity of those of the smaller theropod Minisauripus, meaning that Jialingpus likely hunted Minisauripus.

== See also ==
- List of dinosaur ichnogenera
