= Feitianshan Formation =

Geologic formation in China

- Stratigraphic range: Early Cretaceous
- Type: Geological formation
- Unit of: Baju Tracksite

Lithology
- Primary: Sandstone

Location
- Coordinates: 27.8°N 102.6°E
- Approximate paleocoordinates: 25.4°N 108.9°E
- Region: Sichuan
- Country: China
- Extent: Sichuan Basin
- Feitianshan Formation (China) Feitianshan Formation (Sichuan)

The Feitianshan Formation is a geological formation in China. It dates back to the Early Cretaceous. Among the known ichnofossils are footprints of dinosaurs.

== Vertebrate ichnofauna ==
Ichnotaxa
Ichnogenus	Ichnopecies	Location	Stratigraphic position	Material	Images
Dromaeopodus	Dromaeopodus .sp			Several tracks	
Eubrontes	Eubrontes.sp				
~~Irenesauripus~~	Grallator acutus				
Jialingpus	J. yuechiensis			Multiple Trackways	
Megalosauripus	Megalosauripus .sp			Several tracks	
Minisauripus	M. chuanzhuensis M. zhensuonani			Multiple trackways reported to have been made in the same direction as those of Jialingpus. It may have been hunted by it.	

Color key: Taxon / Reclassified taxon / Taxon falsely reported as present / Dubious taxon or junior synonym / Ichnotaxon / Ootaxon / Morphotaxon	Notes; Uncertain or tentative taxa are in small text; ~~crossed out~~ taxa are discredited.
