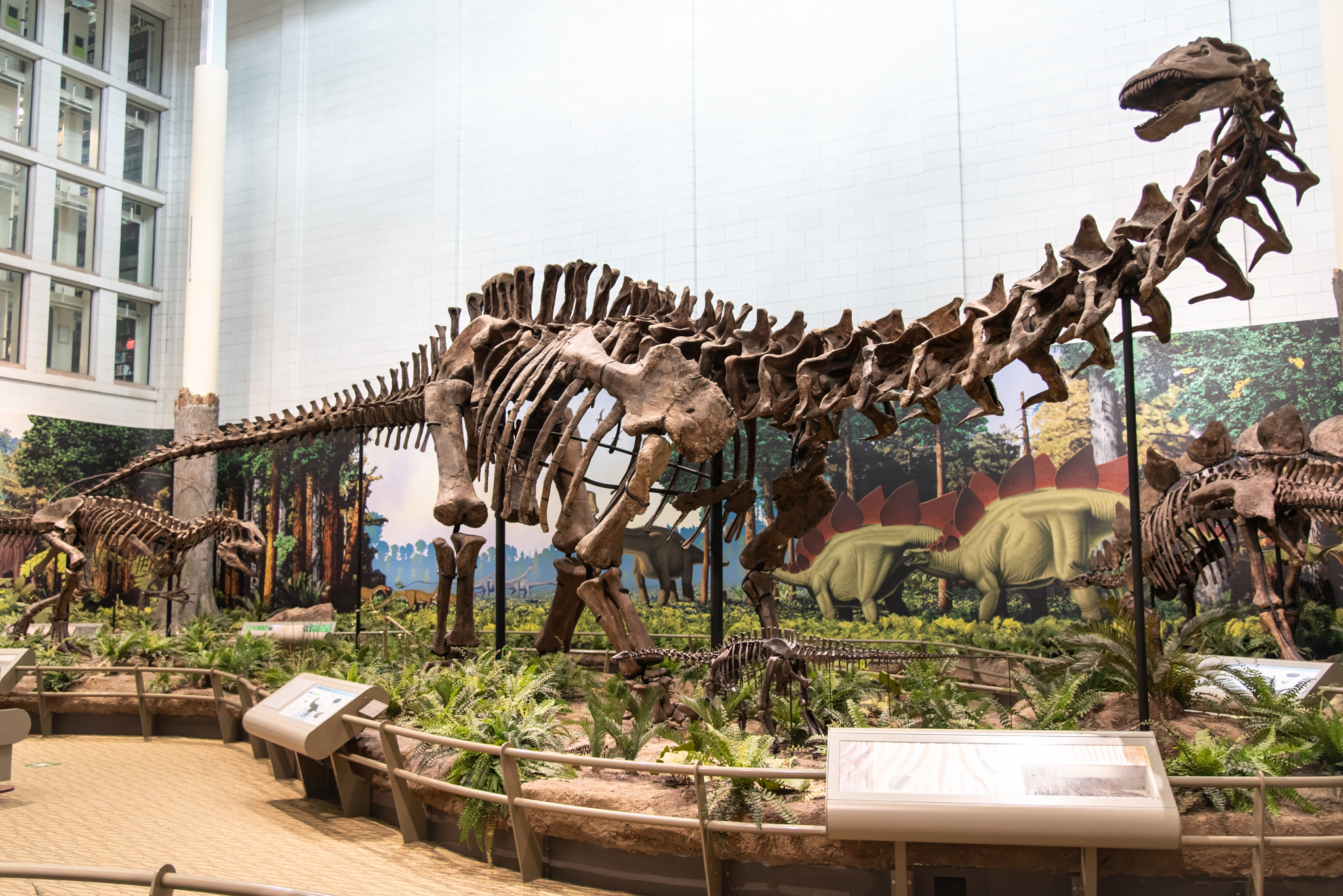
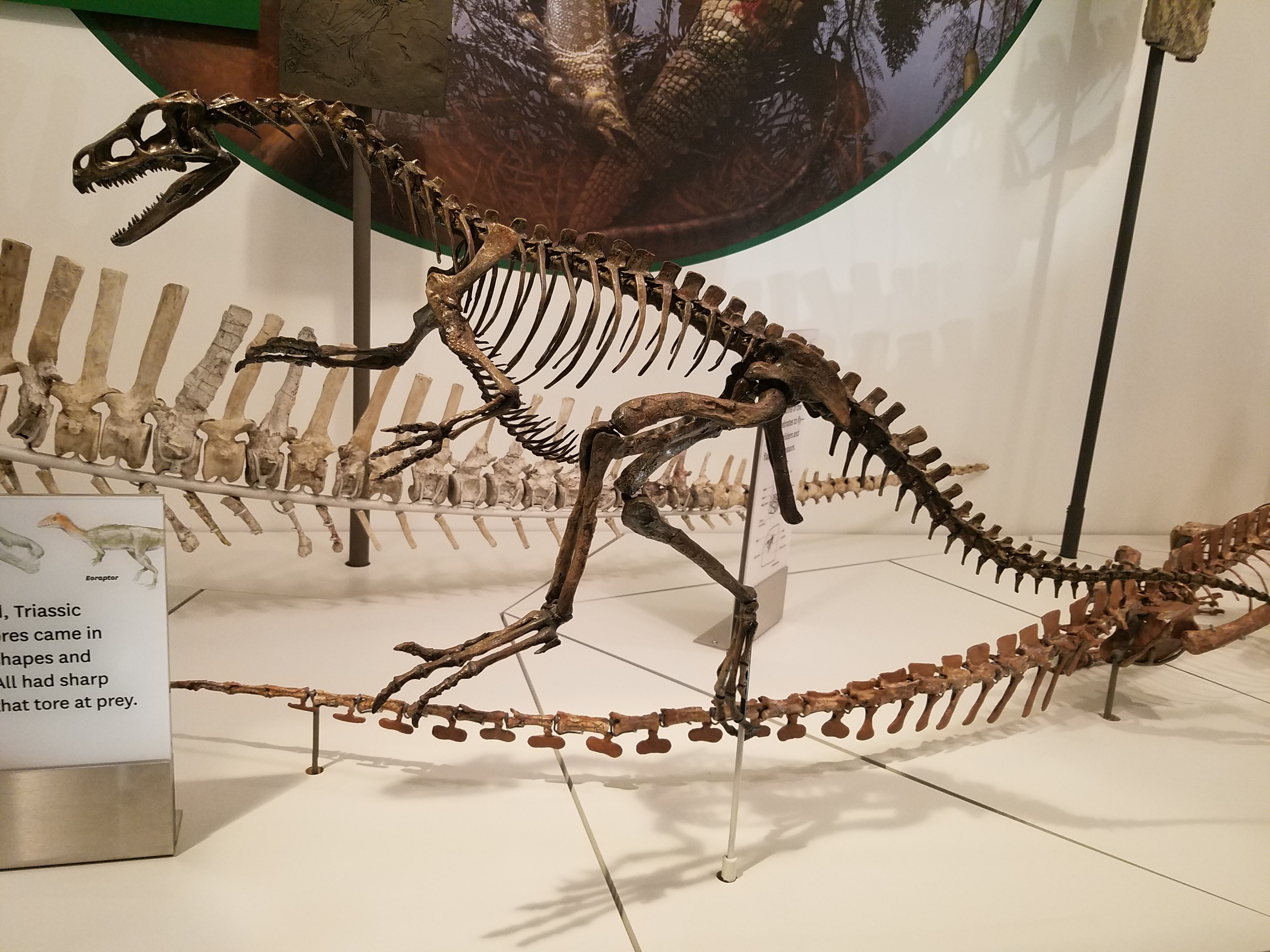
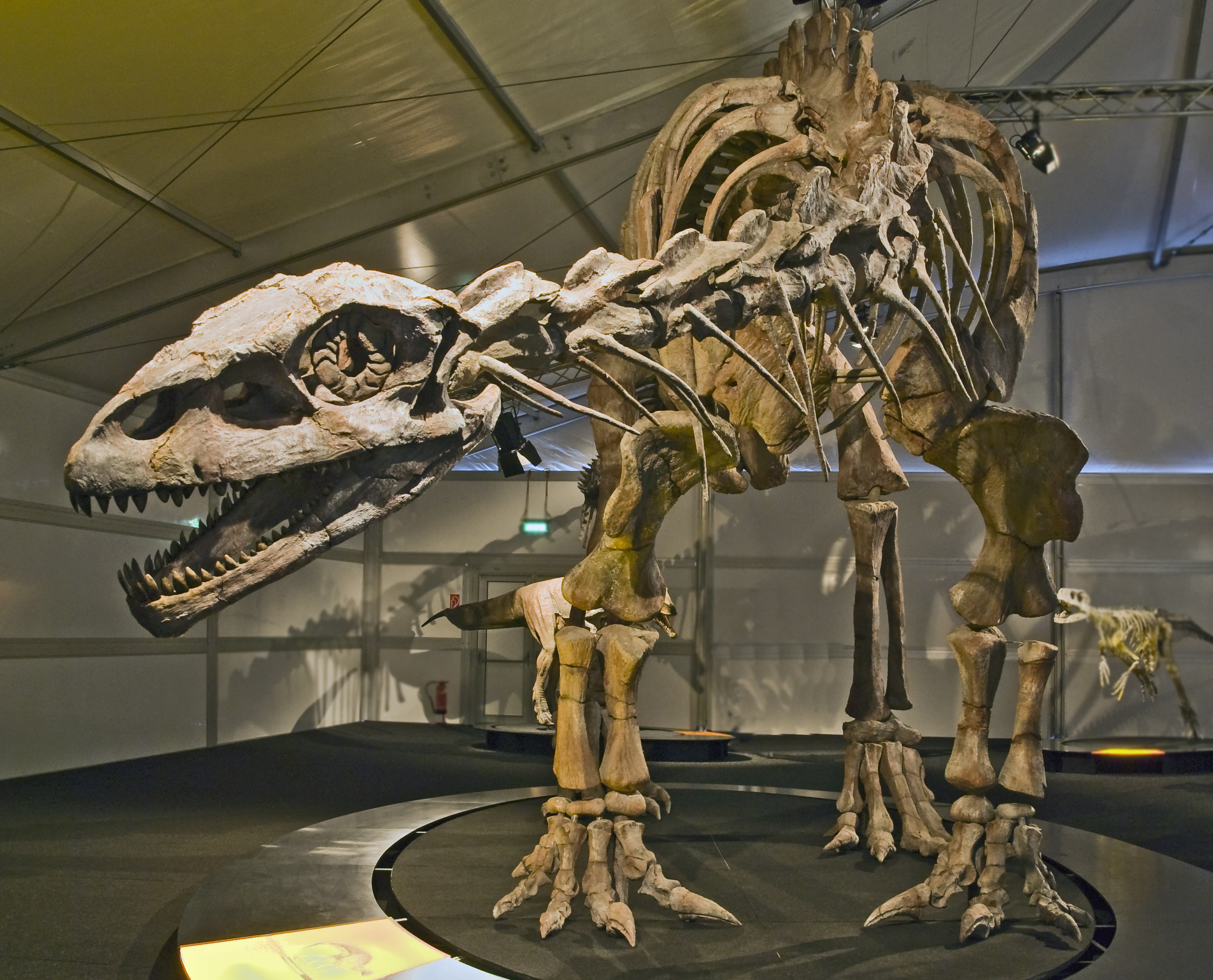
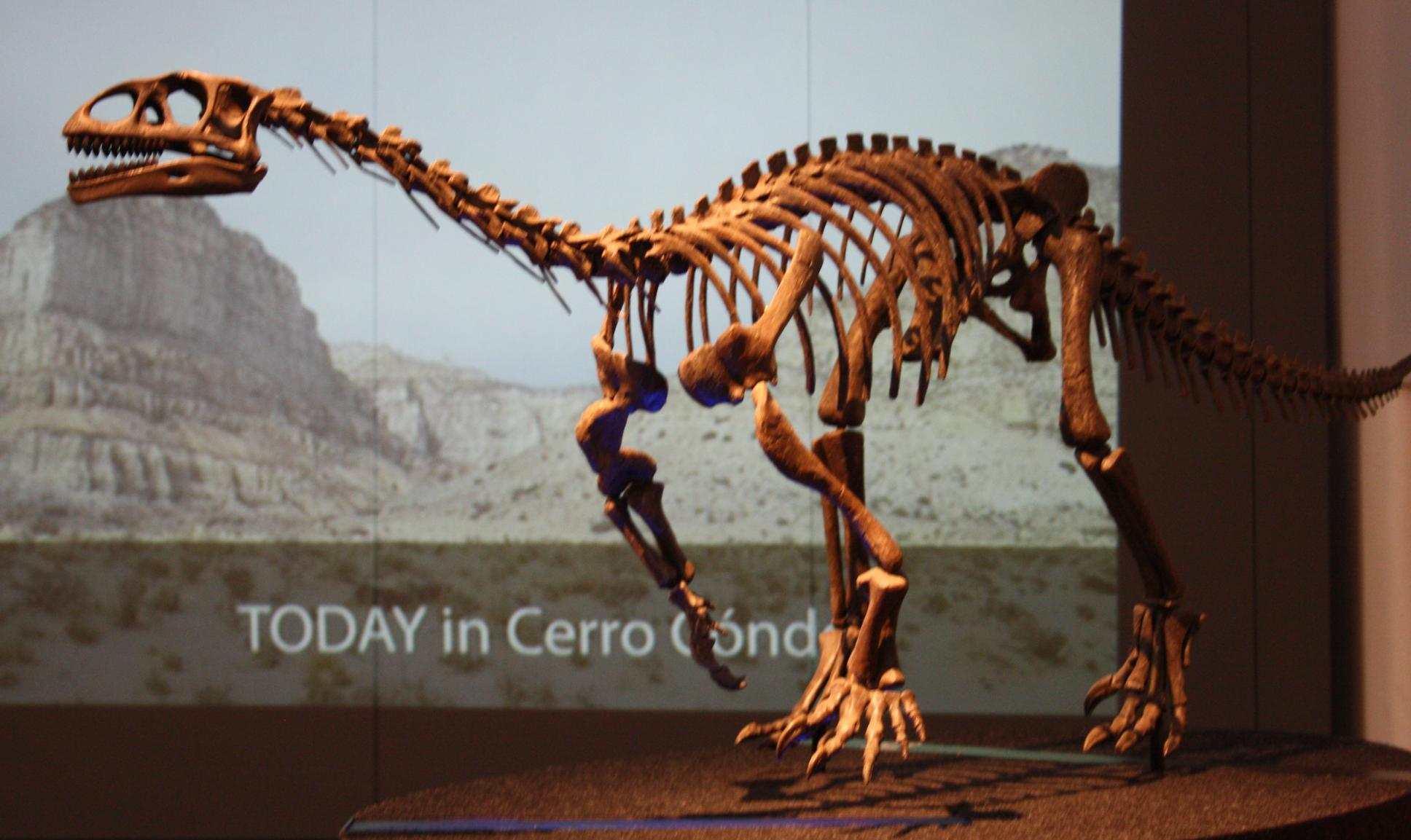
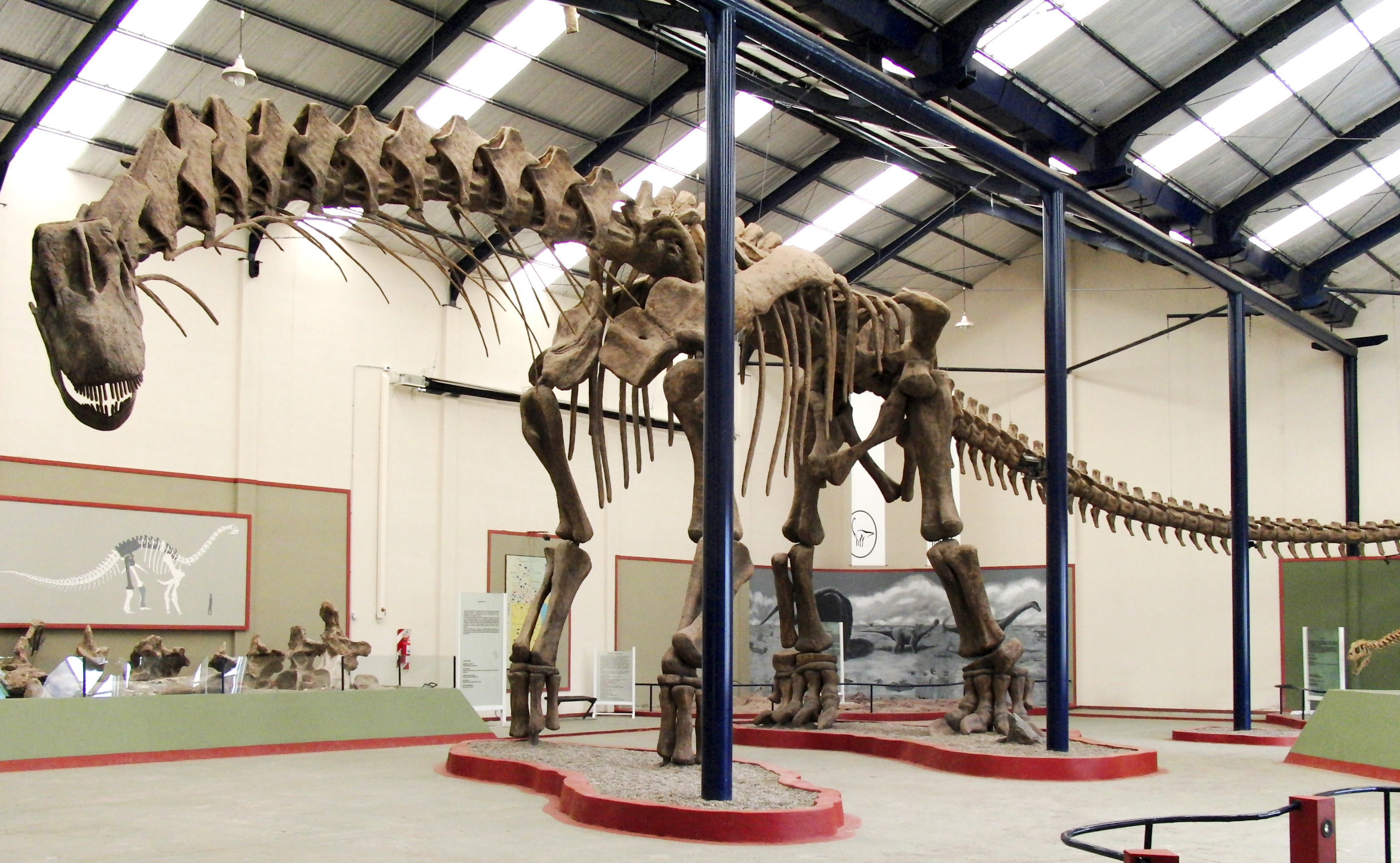
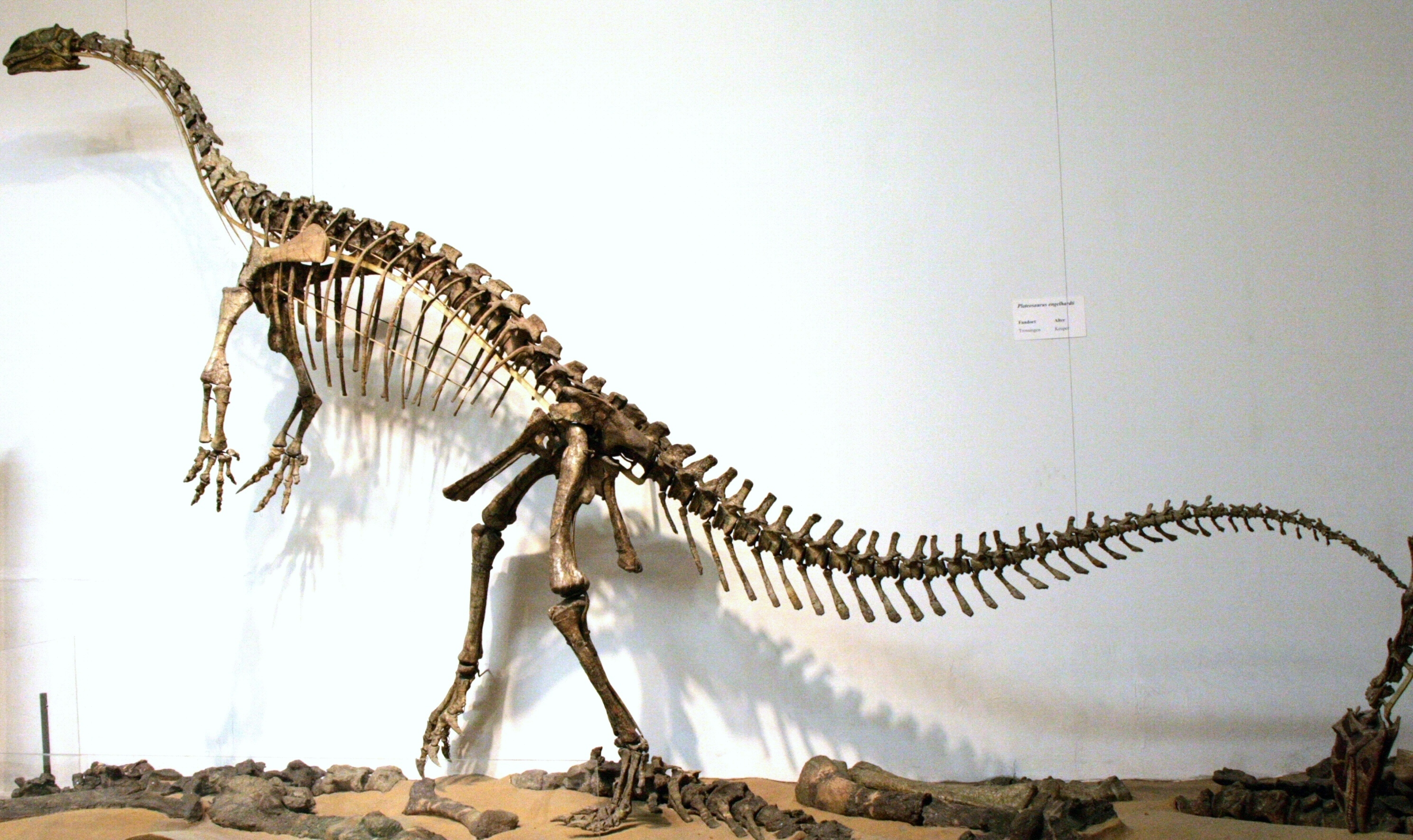
- Six sauropodomorphs (clockwise from top left): Apatosaurus, Eoraptor, Leonerasaurus, Plateosaurus, Argentinosaurus, Lessemsaurus

Scientific classification
- Kingdom: Animalia
- Phylum: Chordata
- Class: Reptilia
- Clade: Dinosauria
- Clade: Saurischia
- Clade: †Sauropodomorpha; Huene, 1932

Subgroups
- †Ahvaytum?
- †Buriolestes
- †Eoraptor
- †Mbiresaurus
- †Xixiposaurus?
- †Guaibasauridae
- †Saturnaliidae
- †Bagualosauria Langer et al., 2019
  - †Arcusaurus
  - †Asylosaurus
  - †Bagualosaurus
  - †Efraasia
  - †Huayracursor
  - †Nambalia
  - †Pantydraco
  - †Plateosauravus
  - †Ruehleia
  - †Thecodontosauridae
  - †Plateosauria Tornier, 1913
    - †Plateosauridae
    - †Unaysauridae
    - †Massopoda Yates, 2007
      - †Ignavusaurus
      - †Kholumolumo
      - †Musankwa
      - †Nyana
      - †Sarahsaurus
      - †Tuebingosaurus
      - †Wudingloong
      - †Xiangyunloong
      - †Massospondylidae
      - †Riojasauridae
      - †Sauropodiformes
Possible sauropodomorphs
- †Agnosphitys
- †Ahvaytum
- †Alwalkeria
- †Nyasasaurus
- †Herrerasauridae

= Sauropodomorpha =

Sauropodomorphs Temporal range: 233.23–66 Ma

Extinct clade of dinosaurs

Sauropodomorpha (/ˌsɔːrəˌpɒdəˈmɔːrfə/ SOR-ə-POD-ə-MOR-fə; from Greek, meaning "lizard-footed forms") is an extinct clade of saurischian dinosaurs that includes the long-necked, herbivorous sauropods and their ancestral relatives. Early, more basal sauropodomorphs (traditionally termed prosauropods) were bipedal, and the earliest show evidence of omnivorous or carnivorous diets. Over time, sauropodomorph evolution resulted in a shift to herbivorous diets, larger body sizes, and quadrupedal locomotion. The sauropods themselves generally grew to very large sizes, had long necks and tails, and became the largest animals to ever walk the Earth. The sauropods were the dominant terrestrial herbivores throughout much of the Mesozoic Era, from their origins in the Late Triassic (approximately 230 Ma) until their decline and extinction at the end of the Cretaceous.

== History of study ==
=== Early study ===
Gigantic bones of sauropods have been known for thousands of years and become part of legends and cultures but the beginning of their scientific study was in the 1830s. Most of the early taxonomy was based on incomplete and disarticulated material as relatively complete skulls or skeletons were not discovered until closer to the end of the 19th century. The French anatomist Georges Cuvier studied large fossils from the Jurassic of Stonesfield Slate in England, believing them to have belonged to ancient relatives of whales up to his death in 1832. However, British paleontologist Richard Owen instead classified these large bones, which he gave the name Cetiosaurus in 1841, as marine whale-like crocodilians. This was the second genus of sauropod to be named, following his earlier description of a single isolated tooth as the taxon Cardiodon. At the same time, the first early sauropodomorphs were being described, with Thecodontosaurus named in 1836 for material from England and Wales, and Plateosaurus named in 1837 for material from Germany. Owen would even name the early sauropodomorph Massospondylus in 1854 for partial specimens from southern Africa, though all these early taxa were considered carnivorous theropods rather than relatives of sauropods. Owen's interpretation of Cetiosaurus as a marine crocodilian, which he specifically excluded from Dinosauria when he named it in 1842, began to be disputed with additional discoveries of limb bones of both Cetiosaurus and the new sauropod Pelorosaurus, with the classification of "cetiosaurs" as dinosaurs firmly established by 1874 by which time many the other genera including Aepisaurus and Astrodon had been named.

The limited samples of material of sauropods and sauropodomorphs were followed by abundant discoveries in the late 19th and early 20th centuries from North America and east Africa. In the United States, American paleontologists Othniel Charles Marsh and Edward Drinker Cope began substantial excavations and competition that would be termed the Bone Wars. From this, Marsh and Cope would name and describe exemplars of the first complete sauropod skulls and skeletons, as well as the mostly complete skull and skeleton of the sauropodomorph Anchisaurus. Many of the most iconic sauropods-Apatosaurus, Brontosaurus, Camarasaurus, and Diplodocus-were all named during this time. In 1859 Owen had named the group Opisthocoelia to unite the "cetiosaurs" Cetiosaurus and Streptospondylus as crocodilians, followed by the naming of Ceteosauria by Harry Govier Seeley in 1874 for "cetiosaurs" as dinosaurs. Marsh ignored both of these older names to create the group Sauropoda in 1878 (from the Ancient Greek words sauros and podus as "saurian/lizard feet"), which became the accepted name following his work on their classification throughout the end of the 19th century and is now the term used. The early forms of sauropodomorphs were united within Prosauropoda by German paleontologist Friedrich von Huene in 1920 as a primitive stock to give rise to both theropods and sauropods, with Sauropodomorpha being named in 1932 by Huene to unite prosauropods and sauropods as the sister to Carnosauria.

== Anatomy ==
=== Body size ===
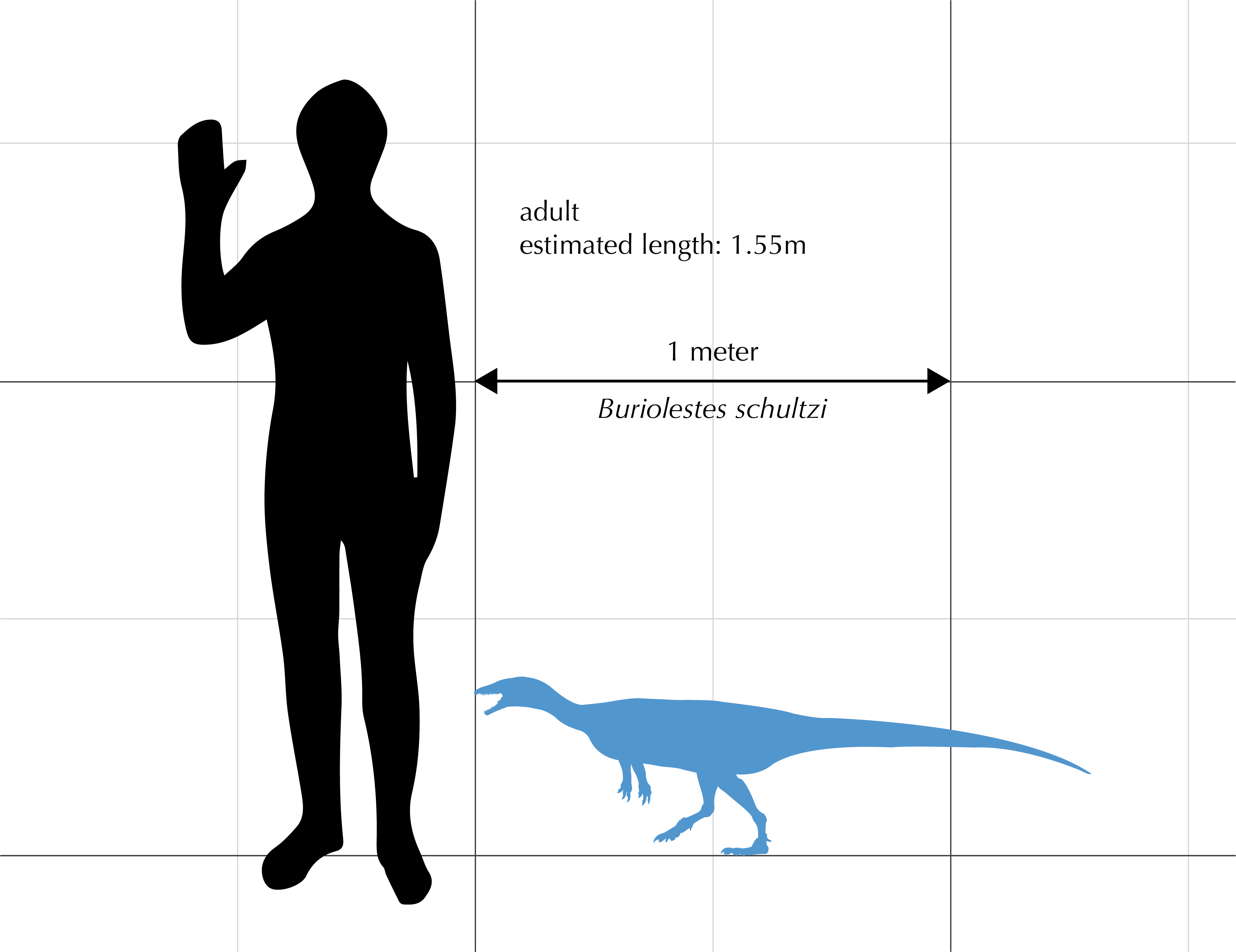
Size of Buriolestes (the oldest known sauropodomorph) compared to a human

The earliest and most primitive sauropodomorphs—animals like Buriolestes and Pampadromaeus—were small bipedal animals that were in the range of 1–2 m (3.3–6.6 ft) in length and had mass of around 2–5 kg (4.4–11.0 lb). These earliest forms were either fully carnivorous or omnivorous, but herbivory quickly became the dominant feeding strategy of sauropodomorphs. Over the course of the Triassic Period, they increased in size, leading to the evolution of animals like Plateosaurus and Gresslyosaurus, which could reach 7–8 m (23–26 ft) long and had mass around 2-2.5 tons. During this period, all sauropodomorphs were obligate bipeds, which was the ancestral condition for dinosaurs. The largest bipedal sauropodomorph known from substantial remains was Lishulong. Only the head and neck of Lishulong are preserved, but this was enough to estimate a total length of about 13 m (43 ft), which is about twice the size of the related Yunnanosaurus, which is known from more complete remains and weighed about 3 tons. However, there is a large but relatively incomplete sauropodomorph (specimen BP/1/5339) discovered in South Africa that has not yet been fully described. Andrew Yates and Matthew Wedel have suggested that the morphology of its arm bones meant it was probably an obligate biped. Scaling based on the sympatric genus Aardonyx and femur allometry, this bipedal sauropodomorph would have had mass between 10-15 tons, making it comparable in size to Diplodocus and possibly one of the largest bipedal animals ever.

Size diagram of Vulcanodon, one of the earliest sauropodomorphs to have columnar limbs

The evolution of obligatory quadrupedality enabled the true sauropods and their closest relatives to achieve very large sizes. The oldest confidently quadrupedal sauropodomorph, Melanorosaurus is not known from very complete remains, and Paul Barrett and Jonah Choiniere declined to suggest a mass estimate in their osteology of Melanorosaurus published in 2024. However, Gregory S. Paul estimated Melanorosaurus to have been about 8 m (26 ft) long and weighed around a ton, which is comparable to many bipedal sauropodomorphs. By the end of the Triassic, the 7 ton Lessemsaurus had evolved, marking the origin of the oldest true sauropods. The early Jurassic saw the evolution of the even larger Ledumahadi, which weighed around 12 tons.

The final anatomical bottleneck on the size of the true sauropods was the anatomy of their limbs. Columnar limbs evolved at some point in the early Jurassic. The oldest sauropod known to have had columnar limbs was Vulcanodon, which lived in what is now Zimbabwe around 199-188 million years ago. Earlier sauropods may have had columnar limbs, but their remains are too incomplete to determine if this is the case. Vulcanodon has been estimated to have had mass up to 10 tons, making it one of the largest terrestrial animals of its time. Most sauropods during this period—such as Barapasaurus, Rhoetosaurus, and Patagosaurus—had mass between 7-10 tons. True gigantism emerged at the beginning of the Late Jurassic; genera like Turiasaurus and Mamenchisaurus were up to 20–25 m (66–82 ft) long and may have had masses up to 30 tons. During the Late Jurassic and throughout the Cretaceous Period, true gigantism evolved independently several times in distantly related sauropod groups. Giants like Brachiosaurus, Dreadnoughtus, and Ruyangosaurus are believed to have exceeded 30–35 m (98–115 ft) in length and had masses in excess of 50 tons, making them the largest land animals of all time. Higher mass estimates have been made for very poorly-known taxa such as Maraapunisaurus and Bruhathkayosaurus, but these remain controversial.

Several of the largest sauropods compared in size to a human

Sauropods reached a variety of different body proportions, so the "largest" individual species will vary based on the measurement concerned. The longest known sauropod was probably Supersaurus, which may have exceeded 40 m (130 ft) in length. The tallest sauropodomorph was probably Sauroposeidon, which had a relatively erect posture and may have been able to reach a height of between 16.5–18 m (54–59 ft). The longest neck of any sauropod known from complete remains is that of Xinjiangtitan, which had a neck 14.9 m (49 ft) meters long. Very large isolated cervical vertebrae from taxa like Hudiesaurus and Mamenchisaurus have been found, but the incompleteness of these remains makes it difficult to assess the total length of their necks. The most massive sauropodomorph known from relatively complete remains is generally accepted to be Argentinosaurus, which may have exceeded 70 tons in mass.

The smallest sauropodomorphs were the oldest and earliest-diverging taxa. Genera like Pampadromaeus and Eoraptor may have been 1.5 m (4.9 ft) long or shorter and had mass as little as 10 kg (22 lb). Sauropods were generally much larger, but several sauropods are believed to have been examples of insular dwarfism. Magyarosaurus, Europasaurus, and Petrustitan are the smallest sauropods known from adult remains; they were between 3–5 m (9.8–16.4 ft) long and had mass less than a ton. Other small sauropods existed throughout the Mesozoic including Haplocanthosaurus, Bonatitan, and Ohmdenosaurus, which were each between 1-2 tons.

=== Skull and tooth morphology ===
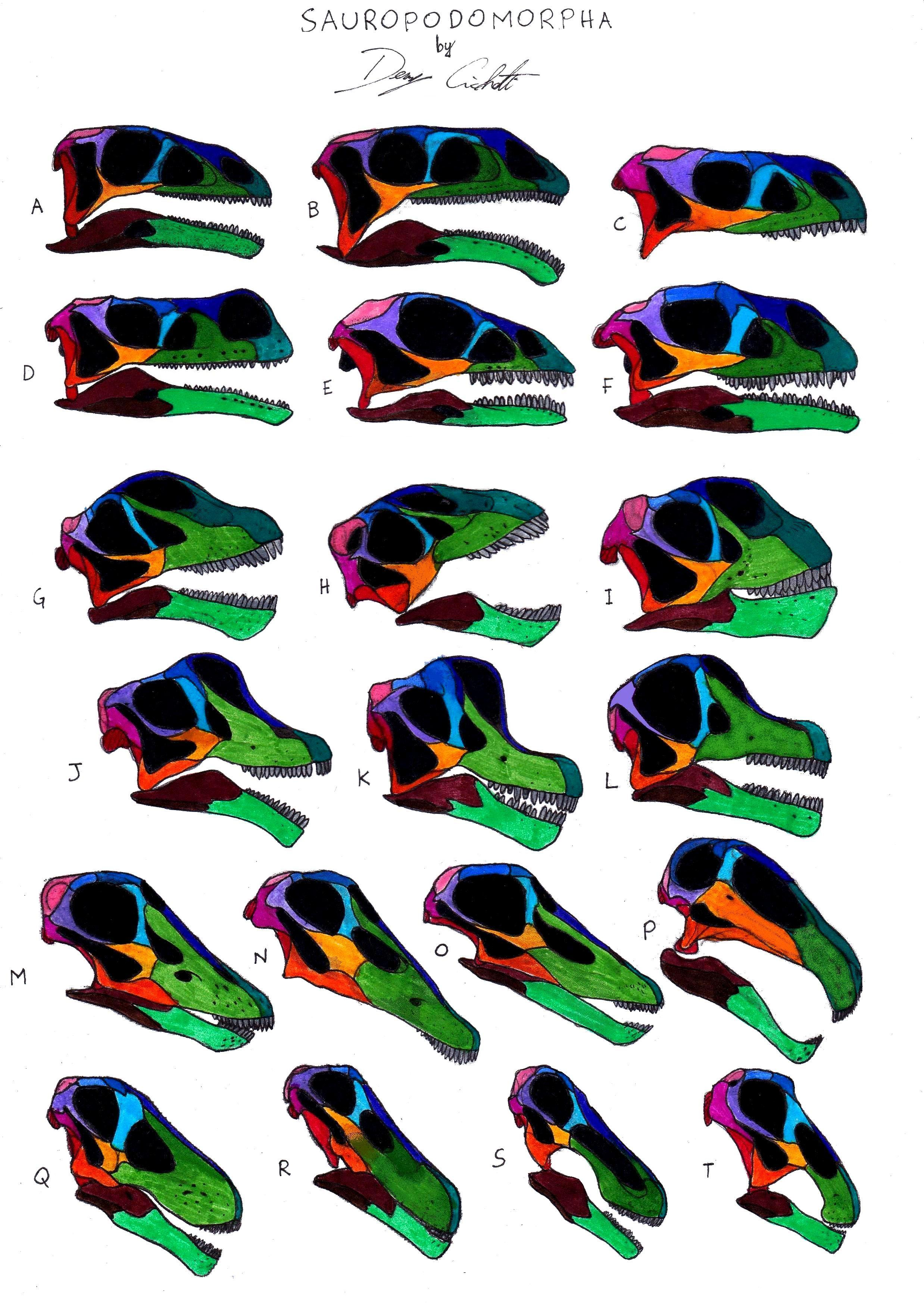
Diagrams of the skulls of various sauropodomrophs in lateral view

The skulls of sauropodomorphs are generally small in relation to body size and generally had large bony nares. However they vary considerably in most other aspects of their morphology. Prosauropods had very narrow skulls (when viewed from above), and the skull morphology of prosauropods was generally conservative. Some prosauropods like Ngwevu and Yizhousaurus evolved relatively wide and robust skulls, but these were the exception. It was not until the diversification of the true sauropods that a wider variety of skull dimensions evolved. Wide and robust skulls evolved on multiple occasions within Sauropoda. The rebbachisaurid Nigersaurus had a relatively wide skull, and similarly wide and robust skulls evolved in Camarasauridae, Brachiosauridae, Euhelopodidae, and other somphospondylans. More basal sauropods, like Shunosaurus, Mamenchisaurus, and members of Diplodocidae, retained relatively narrow and lightly built skulls. However, the study of these trends is complicated by the relative rarity of sauropod skulls in the fossil record.

Study of sauropodomorph tooth morphometrics has been used to divide sauropodomorphs into several evolutionary grades. The first of these, basal sauropodomorphs (including taxa like Eoraptor, Pampadromaeus, and Saturnalia), show a relatively wide disparity in tooth morphology. This is used to infer a wider variety of dietary preferences. Some of these taxa are inferred to have been omnivorous or possibly even carnivorous, and the transition to herbivory took place within this grade. The next grade, the "core prosauropods", includes the large bipedal herbivorous taxa that became abundant during the Late Triassic (Plateosaurus, Massospondylus, Thecodontosaurus, etc). The core prosauropods, with only a few exceptions, have very similar tooth morphology; their teeth are generally non-recurved and are closely spaced to form a relatively continuous cutting edge along the whole length of the jaw. These traits, alongside the generally high mechanical advantage of their jaws, are generally correlated with herbivory, which has been used to infer a broadly similar dietary ecology for the core prosauropods. They were likely very generalized herbivores which may have been facultatively omnivorous. The exception to this general trend is Riojasaurus, which had much more specialized teeth. This suggests that Riojasaurus was a relatively specialized herbivore in comparison to some of its close relatives.

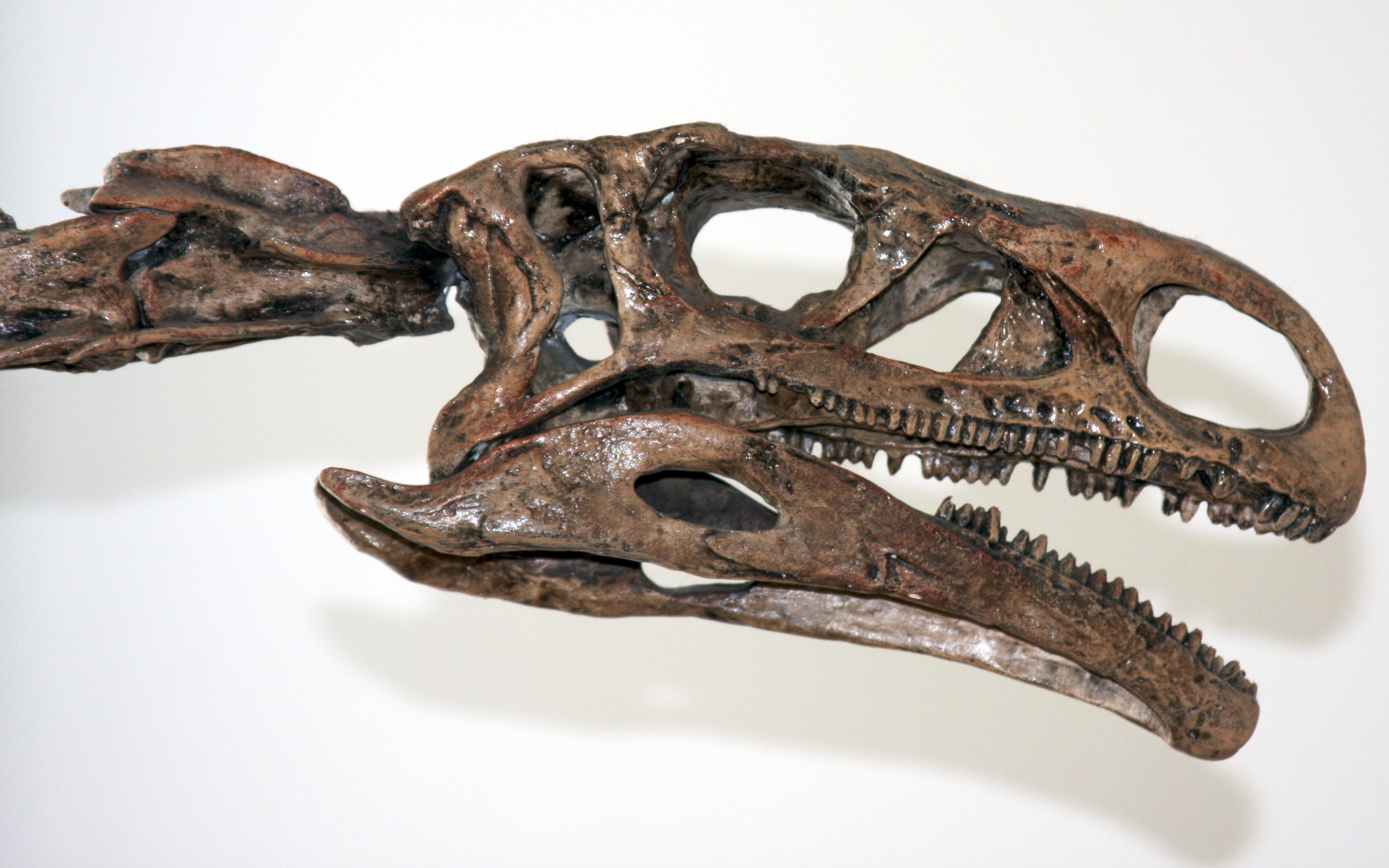
The skull of Plateosaurus, an archetypal "prosauropod"

The evolution of basal sauropodiformes (called "near-sauropods" by some sources) saw a diversification in tooth and jaw functionality. Taxa like Jingshanosaurus possessed relatively uniform and recurved teeth, which may reflect a renewed importance of meat in their diet. Conversely, Yunnanosaurus evolved very narrow teeth which did not occlude with each other; this is believed to be an adaptation for a very specialized herbivorous diet. More derived near-sauropods like Anchisaurus and Mussaurus retained the generalist anatomy of the core prosauropods, and likely had similarly generalist diets. The evolution of the true sauropods saw the emergence of the "broad-crowned" sauropod teeth, which are associated with more robust skulls and higher bite forces. This grade includes the bulk of early sauropod diversity, and until the evolution of diplodocoids and titanosaurs, would remain relatively conservative in morphology.

The ability for sauropodomorphs to increase in size so rapidly is attributed to the evolution of "bulk-browsing". This feeding method is typified by the presence of three skull characteristics. Firstly, the tooth-bearing bones of the skull (the premaxillae, maxillae, and dentaries) developed plates along their alveolar margins to brace these bones against the stresses that occur while feeding. Secondly, the skull itself broadened to allow for greater volumes of food to be eaten at any given time. Thirdly, the soft tissues around the mouth (including cheeks) reduced to allow for a wider gape. The last of these three can only be observed indirectly, since the soft cheek tissues are not preserved in the fossils. The lack of cheeks is inferred by the lack of neurovascular foramina along the areas of the skull from which the cheeks would grow. These three traits would become more elaborate and specialized with the evolution of true sauropods, which developed wider skulls and large gaping capabilities.

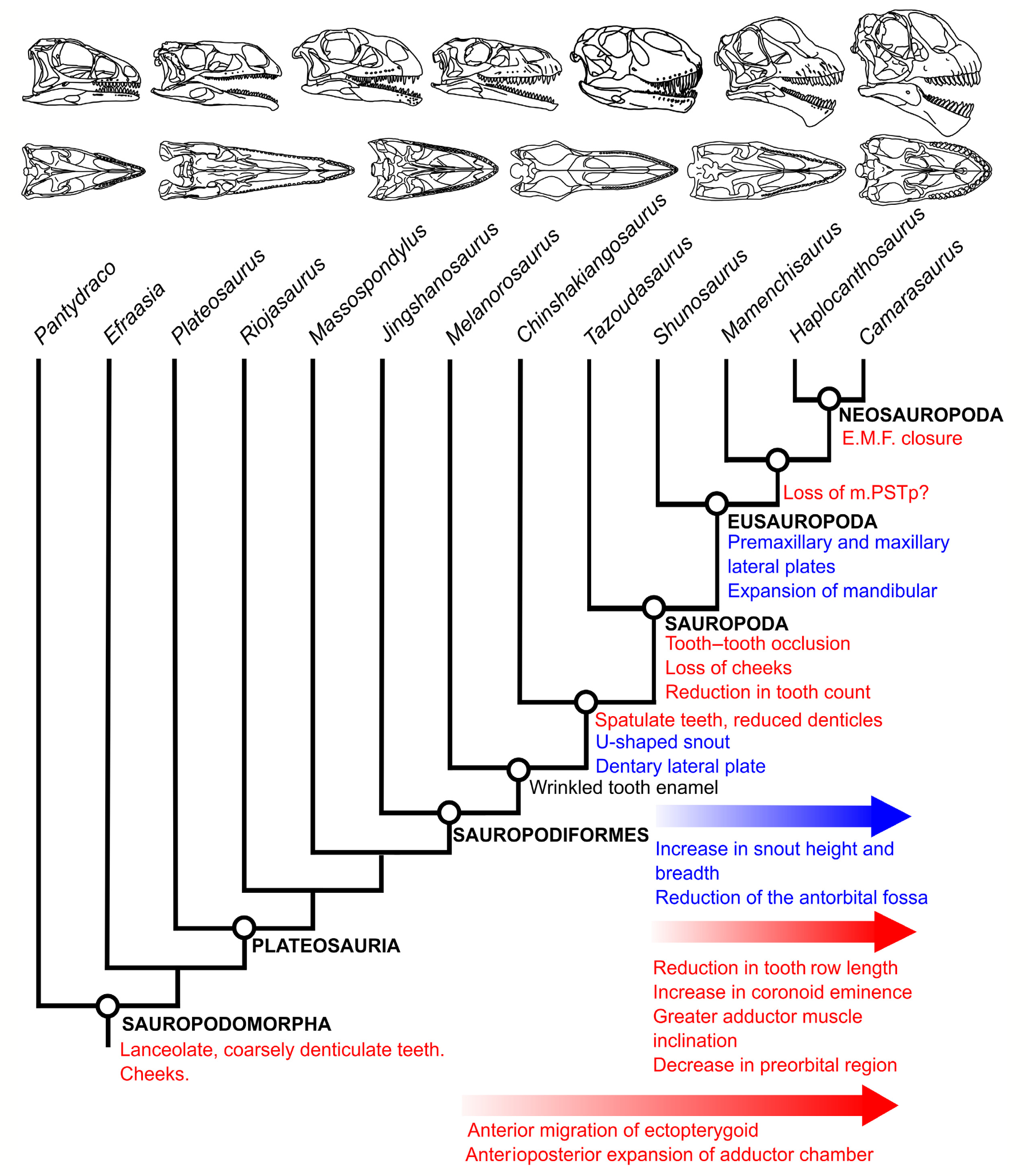
Diagram showing the evolution of skull functionality in sauropodomorphs

Over the course of their evolution, sauropodomorph skulls tended to develop more robust muscle attachment sites, which have been used to infer a trend towards higher bite forces in both absolute and relative terms. This trend coincided with the evolution of more precise dental occlusion, which likely made it easier to take bites of large masses of vegetation. This increase in the robustness of the jaw musculature co-evolved with a similar increase in the size and robustness of the tooth-bearing bones of the skull and a reduction in sizes of the antorbital fossa and the mandibular fossa. The evolution of the true sauropods also saw the migration of the ectopterygoids towards the anterior portion of the jaw, which would have allowed for the development of larger jaw adduction muscles, which also increased bite forces. Some researchers have suggested that these evolutionary trends formed a feedback-loop, with each adaptation reinforcing and enhancing the feeding utility of the others.

The absolute increase in size of the true sauropods in comparison to prosauropods naturally led to the evolution of higher bite forces. However, these adaptations also led to a significant relative advantage in the functionality of their feeding apparatus. The skulls of Plateosaurus and Camarasaurus, while very similar in size, differed considerably in their ability to withstand the forces that feeding would have exerted on the skull. A finite element analysis conducted in 2016 by David Button and colleagues found that, especially in the posterior portion of the jaw, the skull of Camarasaurus could withstand forces an order of magnitude higher than that of Plateosaurus while feeding. This was likely due to the robustness of the skull bones themselves, but was also impacted by the general dimensions of the skull. Plateosaurus and prosauropods generally had longer and narrower skulls than derived sauropods. Their analysis also found that the forces able to be exerted by Plateosaurus—and presumably other prosauropods—varied considerably along the length of their jaw, which suggests that different portions of the jaw served different purposes during feeding. This is in contrast to the bulk-feeding methods of the true sauropods, which prioritized volume and efficiency in feeding, leading to the teeth gradually shifting towards being concentrated in the front of the mouth, with few or no teeth towards the posterior portions of the jaw. This line of evidence was also used to suggest that prosauropods like Plateosaurus may have retained some of the carnivorous dietary habits of their more primitive ancestors.

Some uncertainties remain regarding the evolution of soft tissue anatomy in sauropodomorphs. Some prosauropods skulls have been suggested to preserve osteological correlates associated with cheeks, but true sauropods are generally believed to have lacked cheeks. When this transition occurred remains an unanswered question. Uniquely, some of the features on the maxillae of Riojasaurus suggest that it may have had a rhamphotheca.

=== Neck anatomy ===
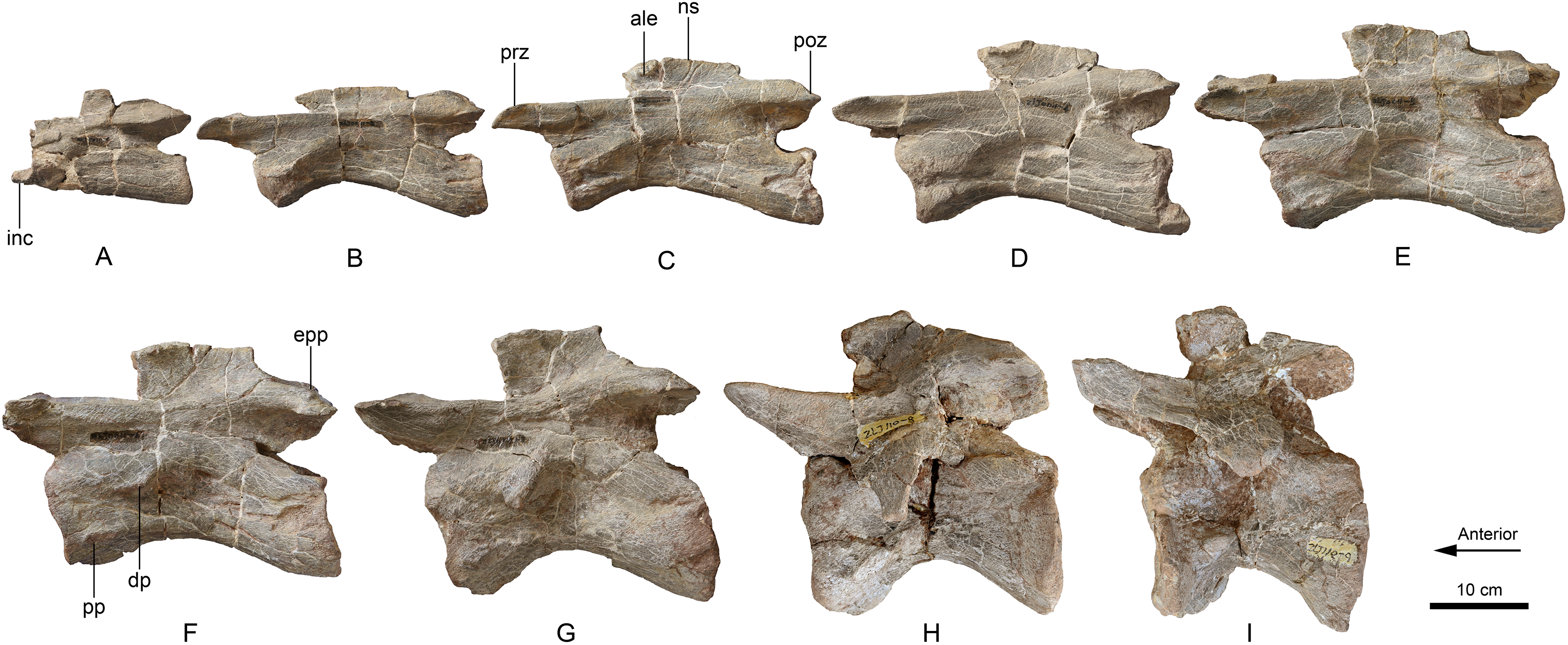
Neck vertebrae of Lishulong, which had the longest neck of any known prosauropod

Neck elongation was among the first anatomical trends to evolve that differentiated sauropodomorphs from their theropod relatives. Within at least the first 8 million years of sauropodomorph evolution, proportional neck length grew from around one-third of trunk length to almost the same as trunk length. The Late Triassic Santa Maria Formation of Brazil preserves this transition. The morphologically conservative Buriolestes is known from around 233 million years ago, and by 225 million years ago, the "core prosauropod" bodyplan had emerged with the evolution of the long-necked Macrocollum. Intermediate forms, such as the moderately elongated neck of Bagualosaurus indicate that this was a gradual process. This initial phase of neck elongation occurred via the elongation of the cervical vertebrae themselves, rather than an increase in the number of vertebrae (both Buriolestes and Macrocollum had 8 cervical vertebrae). This elongation coincided with a shrinking of the skull, probably to reduce the muscular strain on the neck that a large head would create.

The elongation of sauropodomorph necks is suggested to have provided a comparative advantage versus other large herbivores such as aetosaurs and dicynodonts in allowing them to feed on a wider variety of vegetation. This process of neck elongation closely mirrored the evolution of sauropodomorph teeth, which saw a trend towards adaptations for herbivory during this same interval.

The evolution of long necks required a suite of adaptations to sauropodomorph vertebrae. A long neck is necessarily more massive than a short neck, and therefore the evolution of long necks coincided with the development of broad cervical vertebrae to accommodate the expansion of neck muscles. Primitive sauropodomorphs with short necks had weak diapophyses and small or no parapophyses. These features of the vertebrae grew broad in sauropodomorphs with longer necks and likely served as attachment sites for large trapezius muscles. These expanded muscles were necessary for sauropodomorphs to hold their necks and heads up, and the presence of large trapezii is also supported by broad muscle attachment sites on the shoulders of these taxa. The evolution of true sauropods saw an increase in the development of broad and robust cervical vertebrae to facilitate the evolution of increasingly long and massive necks.

=== Skeletal pneumaticity ===
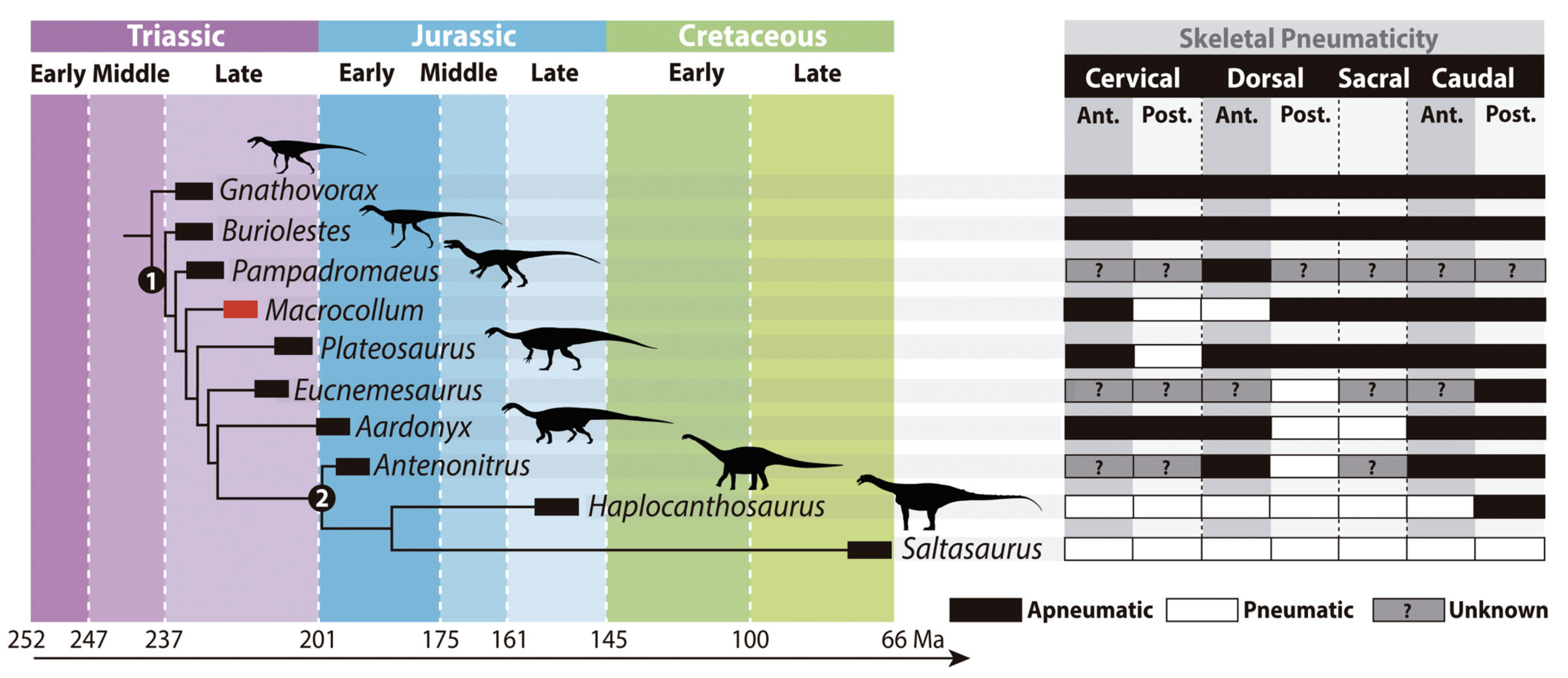
Diagram showing the evolution of invasive air sacs in sauropodomorphs

Sauropodomorphs possessed a system of air sacs throughout their body which were connected to the respiratory system. During development, these air sacs expanded via branching structures called "diverticula" (singular "diverticulum") which invaded and carved holes into parts of the skeleton. These invasive diverticula formed structures called pleurocoels and pneumatic fossae, which are preserved in the fossils and can be used by researchers to infer the presence of these air sacs. These adaptations are also seen in birds, non-avian theropods, and pterosaurs, but are completely absent in ornithischians. This has led to the suggestion that pneumatic skeletons are ancestral to bird-line archosaurs and were secondarily lost in ornithischians. However, an analysis of the skeletons of three dinosaurs including two sauropodomorphs (Buriolestes, Gnathovorax, and Pampadromaeus) conducted in 2022 found that none of the taxa studied possessed signs of an invasive air-sac system in their vertebrae. This led the authors of the study to the conclusion that this respiratory apparatus evolved independently in pterosaurs, theropods, and sauropodomorphs.

An important genus in the study of pneumaticity in early sauropodomorphs is Macrocollum, from the Triassic of Brazil. It is one of the earliest sauropodomorphs to achieve sizes larger than 3 m (9.8 ft), and the skeletal remains of the genus also preserve some of the oldest evidence of pneumatic vertebrae in this group. Earlier taxa are either fully apneumatic (lacking invasive air sacs) or with only very minor pneumaticity, but Macrocollum possessed signs of an invasive air sac system in both the lower cervical vertebrae and upper dorsal vertebrae. It is notable however that the evolution of vertebral pneumaticity in sauropodomorphs was not a linear process. Taxa that evolved after Macrocollum including Plateosaurus possessed invasive pneumaticity in the cervical vertebrae, but seemed to lack this adaptation in the dorsal vertebrae. The Early Jurassic genus Aardonyx had an extensive air sac system in the lower dorsal vertebrae and sacrum, but had entirely apneumatic cervical vertebrae. It appears that extensive pneumaticity along the entire vertebral column did not become established until the evolution of the true sauropods. The exact locations of pneumatic elements on the bones are highly variable even within taxa, which is a consequence of these elements developing in tandem with the circulatory system, rather than the development of the skeleton itself.

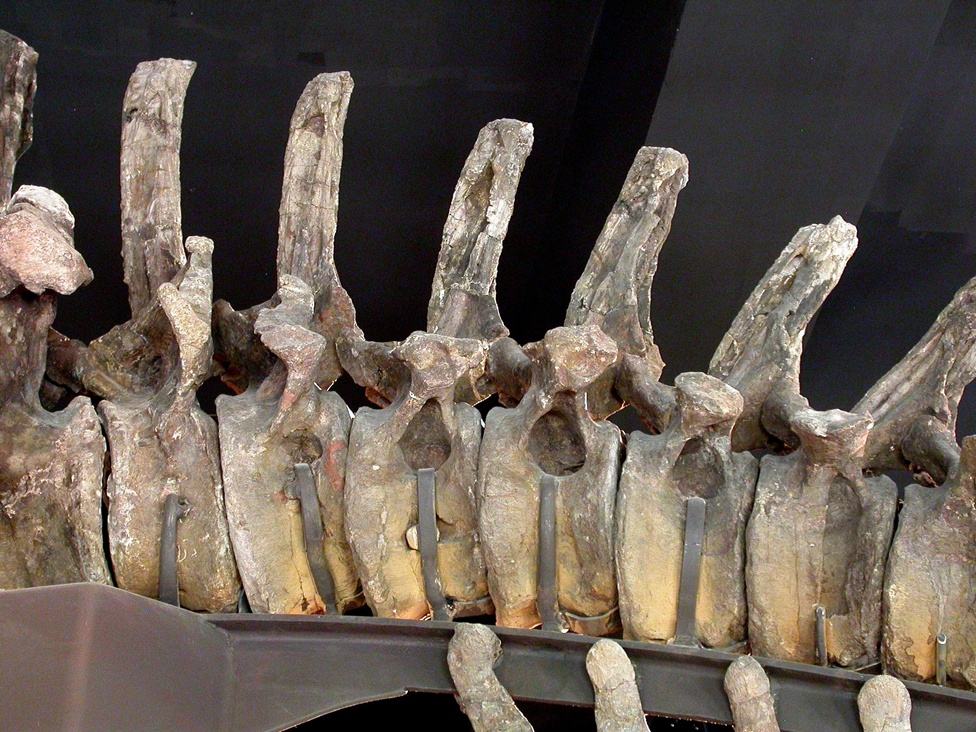
The tail bones of Apatosaurus, with the pneumatic fossae clearly visible

The researchers Matt Taylor and Mike Weddel have written extensively about variation in the invasive air sac systems of sauropodomorphs. Weddel conducted a general review of sauropodomorph skeletal pneumaticity in 2007 which surmised that the ribs and vertebrae of prosauropods were generally much less extensively pneumatized than those of the true sauropods. Some prosauropods, including Pantydraco (then called Thecodontosaurus caudus) possessed excavations in their cervical vertebrae which were described as "pleurocoel-like", but may or may not have been true pleurocoels created by pneumatic diverticula. Other vertebral structures indicative of pneumaticity in true sauropods (laminae and fossae on the vertebrae) are present in various prosauropods such as Plateosaurus and Pantydraco, but these are not interpreted as signs of true pneumaticity because the texture of the bone associated with these structures generally does not differ from fully apneumatic bone. Similar laminae and fossae are present in a variety of other archosaurs including pseudosuchians (which do not have any pneumatic elements in the skeleton), which may indicate that these structures are ancestral to archosaurs and evolved independently of an invasive air sac system.

Skeletal pneumaticity may also have evolutionary benefits in lightening the skeleton. The invasive air sacs made the bones as a whole less-dense, allowing them to increase in size without having to invest the same volume of resources as if the bones were completely solid. This may have been a contributing factor in allowing sauropodomorphs to evolve large sizes in such a short time.

=== Arms and claws ===
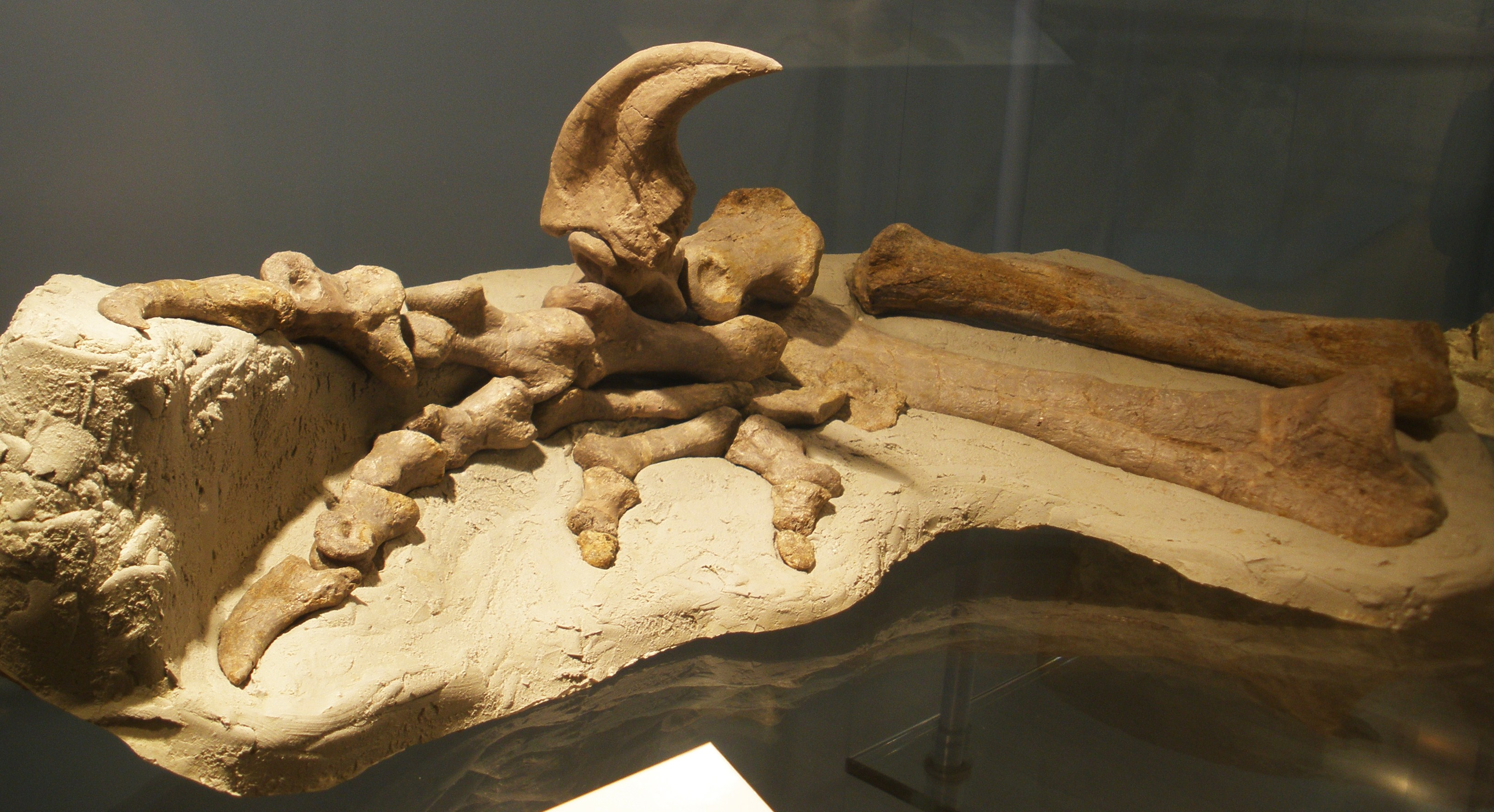
Hand bones of Plateosaurus, showing the enlarged claw on the first finger

Like all dinosaurs, sauropodomorphs evolved from bipedal ancestors with five digits on each hand. They did not however possess claws on all of their digits. Early sauropodomorphs only had claws on the first three digits (sometimes called the "thumb"), and their early evolution was marked by an increase in the size of the first digit and its associated claw. As the transition to quadrupedality took place throughout the Triassic and into the Jurassic, the claws on the second and third digits reduced in size and disappeared. However, even into the Late Cretaceous, large sauropods retained a large claw on the first digit of the hand.

The first major radiation of sauropodomorphs (the "core prosauropods"), retained the relatively short forelimbs of their more primitive ancestors. Plateosaurus and its relatives had forelimbs that were less than half the length of their hind limbs. This meant they were obligate bipeds and used their arms exclusively for non-locomotory purposes. This is further supported by the limited wrist mobility of their hands, which would have prevented them from pronating their hands to plant them on the ground. Functions for their arms, including the large claws on their hands, include for use in feeding and defense from predators, which would have included primitive theropods and large rauisuchians.

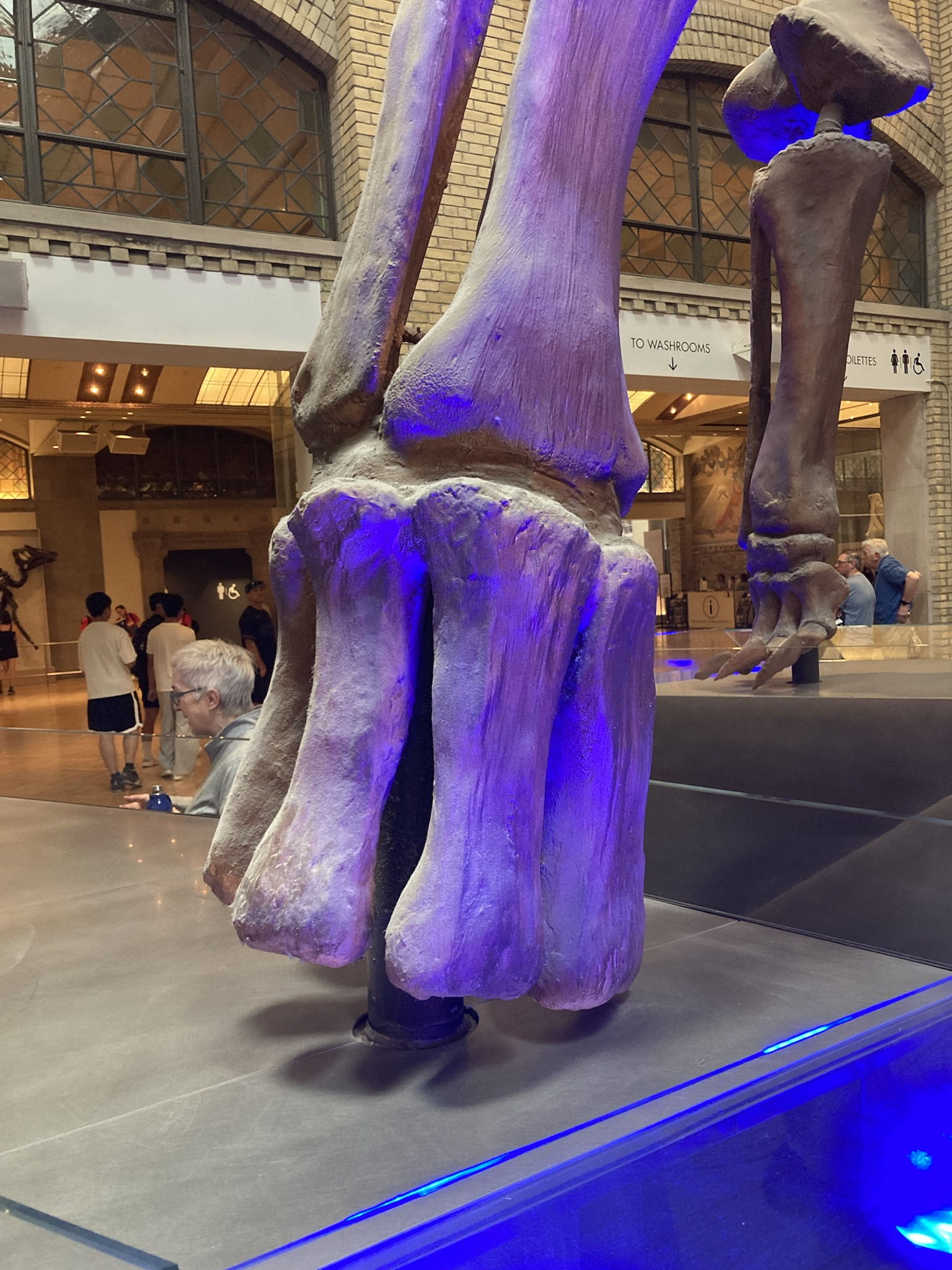
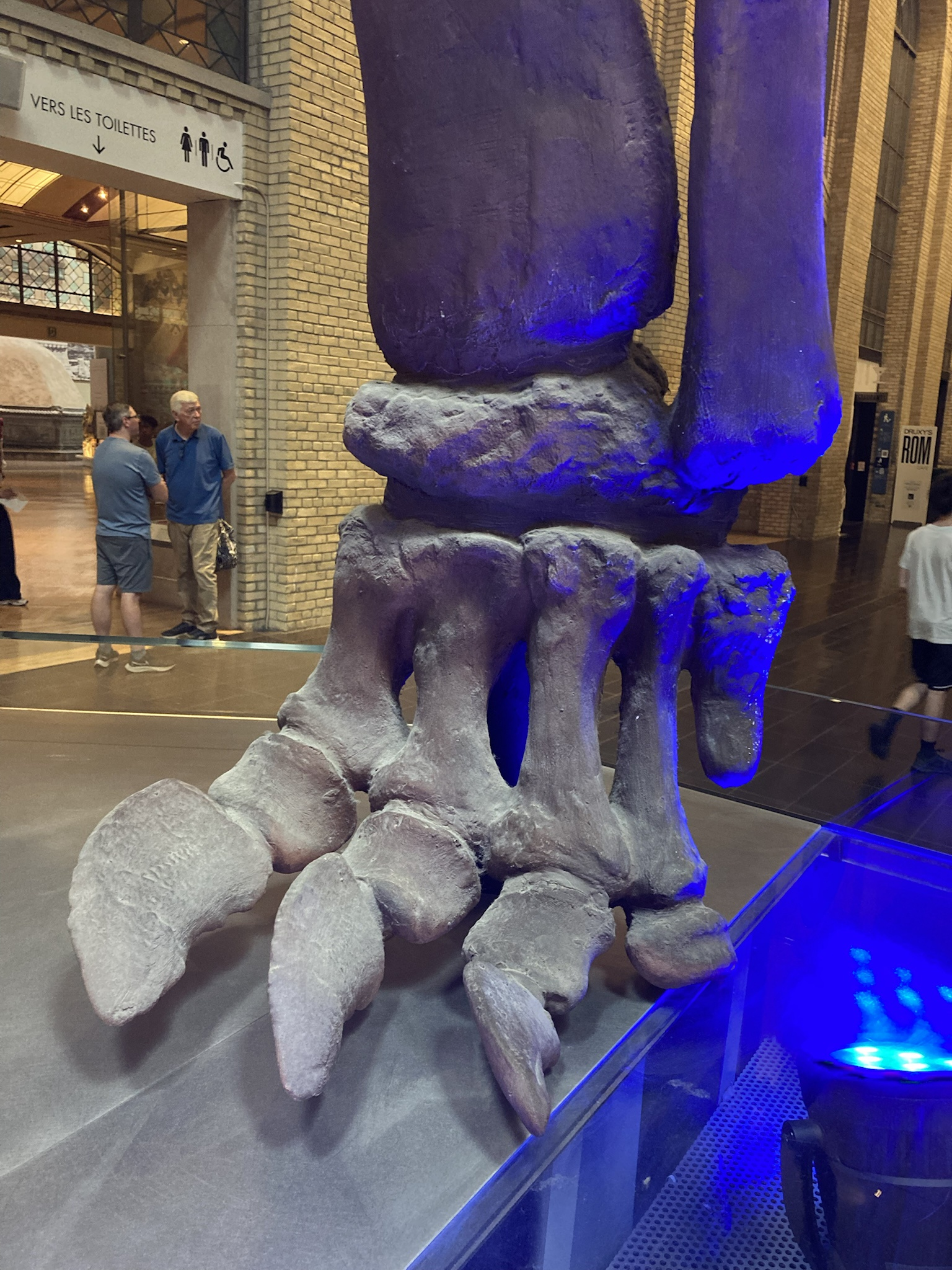
Hand (right) and hindfoot (left) of a titanosaur, showing anatomy in sauropods

A detailed study of the arm musculature of the core prosauropod Unaysaurus suggested that the adduction-abduction range of motion for the forelimbs was between about 74-130 degrees relative to the body. The humerus likely had a range of motion between 105-153 degrees relative to the coracoid, and the elbow likely had a range of motion between about 70-137 degrees relative to the humerus. Range of motion for the forelimbs changed considerably during the course of sauropodomorph evolution. A more derived prosauropod, Mussaurus (which was also bipedal) was likely able to pronate its arms to some degree, and the mobility of its elbow joint was likely much greater than in earlier prosauropods. This was a precursor to the evolution of the fuller pronation which was necessary for quadrupedality to evolve.

The size of the arms relative to the body in sauropodomorphs increased generally during their early evolution. Even fully bipedal taxa like Aardonyx had arms which were similar in length to their hind legs. This saw its culmination with the evolution of Melanorosaurus and the true sauropods, which were believed to have been an obligate quadrupeds and would have used their limbs more exclusively for locomotion. However, even in the largest Early Jurassic sauropodomorphs, such as Ledumahadi, the forelimbs were not fully columnar, and they still retained a degree of mobility in their elbows and wrists that would have been impossible for the true sauropods.

== Paleobiology and behavior ==
Sauropodomorphs reached the age of sexual maturity well before they were fully grown adults. A study by Griebeler et al. (2013) concluded that the maximum growth rates of sauropodomorphs were comparable to those of precocial birds and the black rhinoceros but lower than the growth rates of average mammals.

=== Senses ===
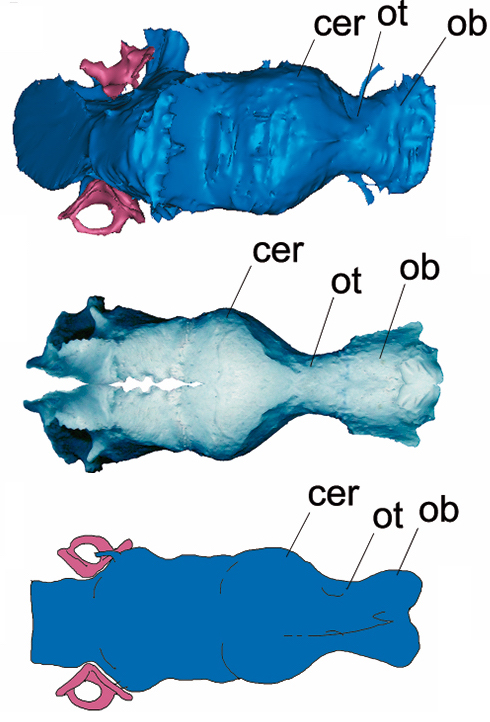
Endocasts of several rebbachisaurid sauropods in dorsal view with the olfactory bulbs labeled (ob)

Inferring the sensory capabilities of extinct animals is difficult due to the lack of soft tissue preservation, so any study of these fields must necessarily rely on skeletal proxies for these sensory systems. One of the methods available is the study of the braincases of taxa with well-preserved skull remains. The brains of archosaurs generally have large olfactory bulbs which comprise the front-most portion of the brain. Well-preserved braincases are rare in fossil vertebrates, but in cases where they do exist, researchers can create endocasts—3D models of the brain based on the internal structure of the braincase. Rodrigo Müller conducted one such study in 2022 on sauropodomorphs specifically. He sampled the braincases of over 30 dinosaur species including several primitive sauropodomorphs, core prosauropods, and derived true sauropods in order to measure the "olfactory ratios" (ORs) of these taxa (an established estimate for the volume of the brain dedicated to smell). The absolute and proportional size of this region of the brain varied considerably among the sampled taxa. Notably, Buriolestes had very large olfactory bulbs, which is a condition shared by Saturnalia, Panphagia, and Pampadromaeus. Plateosaurus had very small olfactory bulbs, but Massospondylus (which lived more recently that Plateosaurus) had a very high OR, similar to Macrocollum (which lived much earlier than both), which suggests that the evolution of olfactory capacity in sauropodomorphs was complex and did not exhibit a linear progression.

For the taxa which had published mass estimates (Buriolestes, Macrocollum, Diplodocus, Camarasaurus, and Nigersaurus), Müller compared these ORs to their total body mass, and these relationships were in turn compared to the OR-to-body-mass ratios for theropods and ornithischians. He found that Butiolestes, Macrocollum, and Camarasaurus had very high OR-to-body-mass ratios compared to most of the other dinosaurs sampled. This suggests that smell was an important sense for a wide variety of sauropodomorph taxa regardless of absolute body size. The earliest sauropodomorph taxa are believed to have been carnivores, and smell likely served a predatory function in taxa like Buriolestes. However, the continued prevalence of the olfactory bulbs in fully herbivorous taxa suggests that it remained important for other reasons. Suggested functions include distinguishing edible plants from inedible plants, detecting predators, or using smell in social interactions.

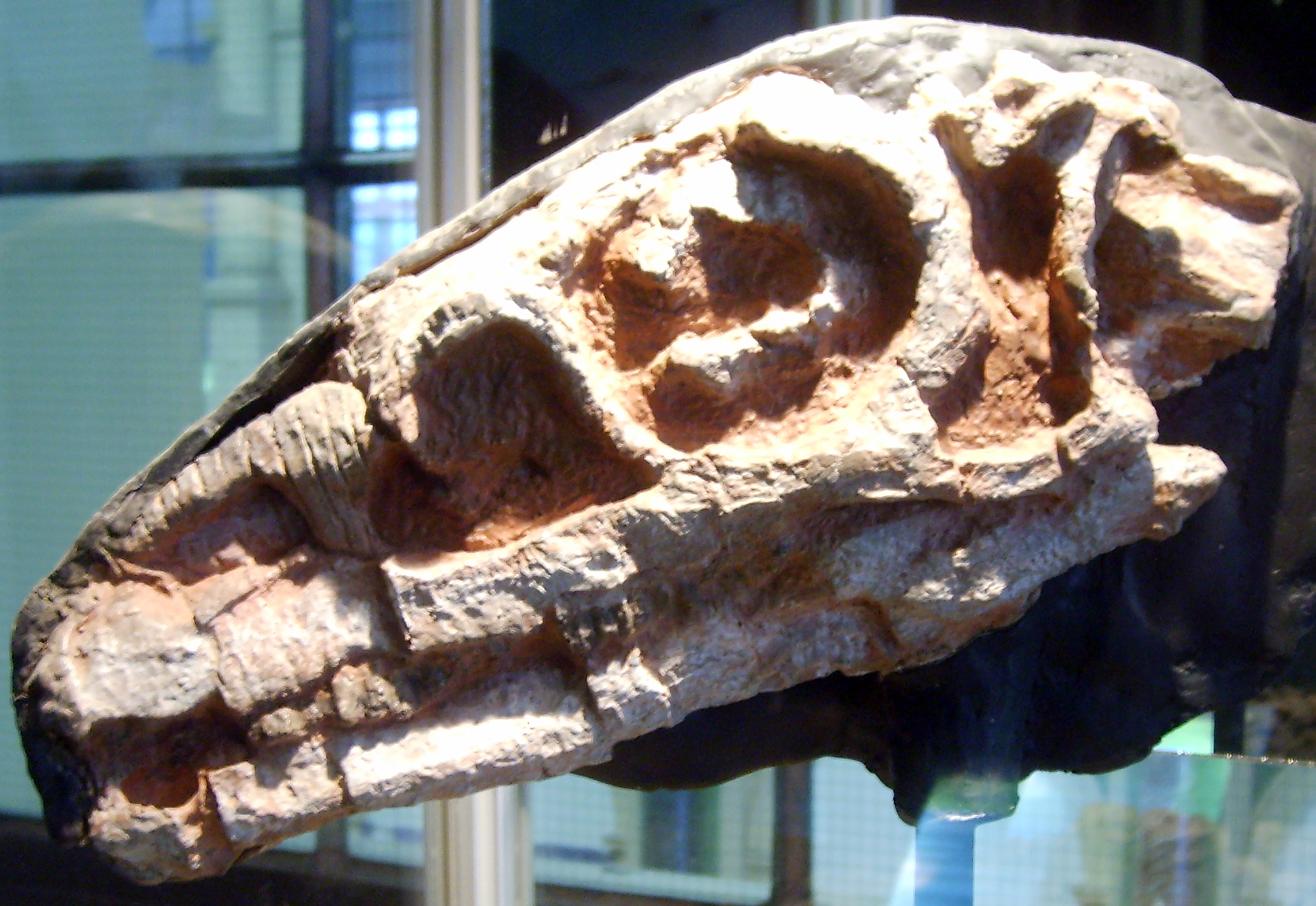
The skull of Riojasaurus, with the scleral ring clearly visible in the eye socket

A study in 2011 by Lars Schmitz and Ryosuke Motani examined another skeletal feature believed to correlate with sensory function, the scleral rings in the eyes of extinct archosaurs. Schmitz and Motani examined 33 taxa including five sauropodomorphs from which the scleral morphology is known (Diplodocus, Lufengosaurus, Nemegtosaurus, Plateosaurus, and Riojasaurus). The thickness and diameter of the scleral ring is correlated strongly to both the absolute and relative sizes of the pupils and lenses in the eyes of modern animals, and it can therefore be used to approximate the ability for an extinct animal to see in the dark. Schmitz and Motani discovered that the scleral morphology of the sauropodomorphs studied indicated that they were likely capable of seeing in most light conditions. This suggests that they were likely active for long periods both during the day and night. They hypothesized that this was a result of their large size and herbivorous, because they found a similar in large herbivorous ornithischians. The absolute size of even early sauropodomorphs (exceeding one metric ton) necessitated that they would have likely had to feed for 12 or more hours every day, which likely meant they had to be habitually active in low-light conditions as well as during the day. One of the sauropodomorphs studied, Lufengosaurus, may have even been primarily active during the night, but this finding was ambiguous.

The hearing abilities of sauropodomorphs have not been the subject of extensive study. Michael Hanson and colleagues published a study of reptile inner ear morphology in 2021 in which they examined the bony ear structure of numerous reptiles including the sauropodomorph Thecodontosaurus. Archosaur cochlear shape elongated in a relatively linear fashion on the line towards birds, which was suggested by Hanson and colleagues to be a paedomorphic adaptation to hear the high-pitched vocalizations of juveniles of the same species. This line of evidence is also used to suggest that parental care evolved early in the evolution of archosaurs, and therefore would have been present in sauropodomorphs. The high-pitched calls of juvenile sauropodomorphs would have been distinct and differentiable to the parents' ears from other ambient noise. Thecodontosaurus fit into the general category that Hanson and colleagues called "Semicircular Canal Morphotype 2", with dimensions similar to other non-avian dinosaurs and palaeognaths, suggesting the general hearing capabilities of these groups were broadly similar.

=== Diet and digestion ===
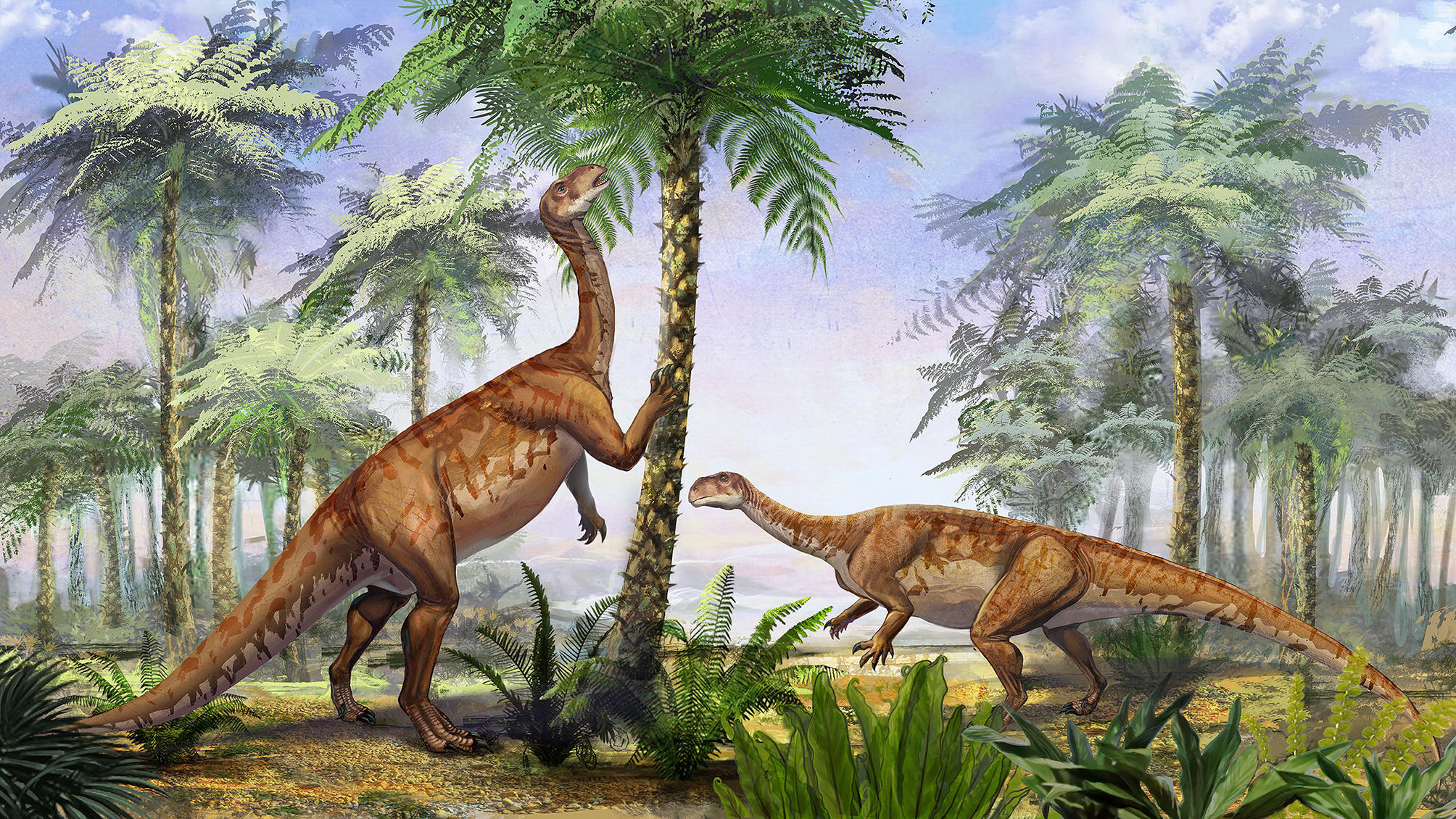
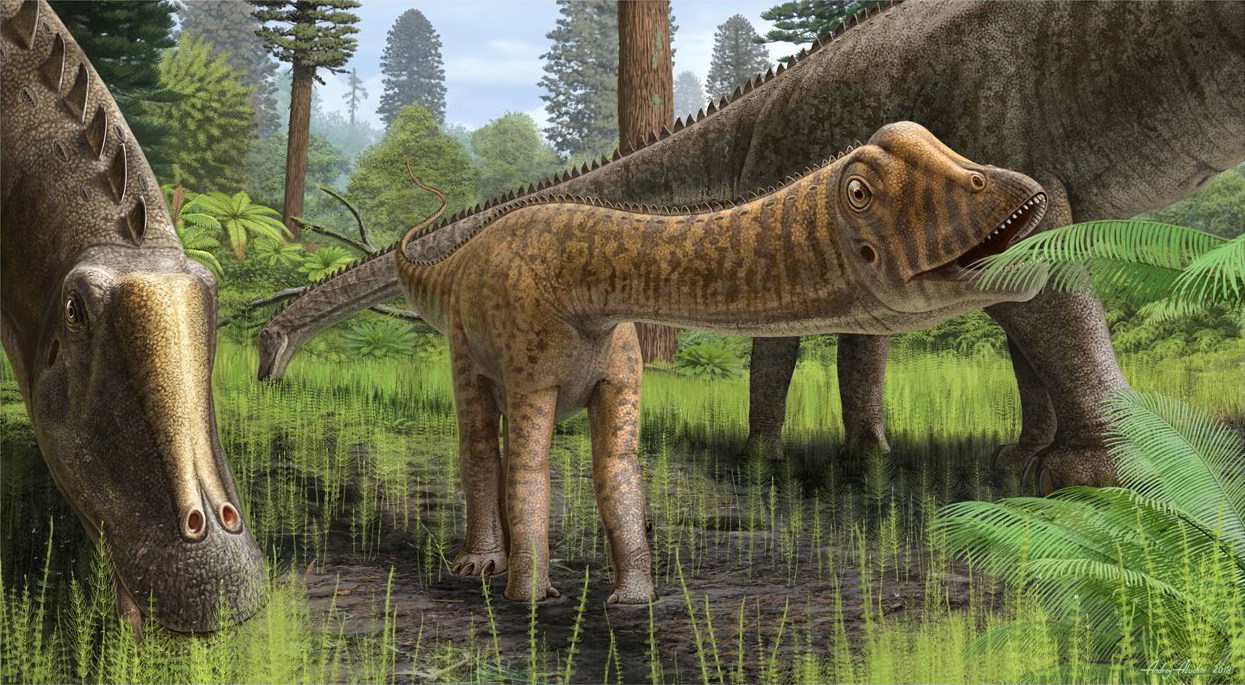
Life restorations of sauropodomorphs feeding (Irisosaurus on top, Diplodocus on bottom)

Sauropodomorphs exhibited a wide variety of diets over the 160 million years during which they existed. Sauropodomorphs are believed to have been ancestrally carnivorous, with later genera evolving to be omnivorous. The largest prosauropods and the true sauropods are believed to have been the first group of dinosaurs to become fully herbivorous, with this dietary shift contributing to their general increase in body size. There were exceptions to this trend including the prosauropod Jingshanosaurus, which had slender recurved teeth, pointing to a possibly carnivorous diet. Herbivory in most prosauropods is well attested by a suite of tooth adaptations many sauropodomorphs possessed. These include spatulate (leaf-shaped) teeth with serrations similar to extant herbivorous lizards, the orientation of the teeth to form a continuous cutting edge well suited for slicing vegetation, and a marked decrease in tooth size along the length of the jaw. These adaptations are seen in most of the core prosauropods (e.g. Massospondylus, Plateosaurus, and their relatives) and are broadly conserved in more advanced prosauropods as well as the true sauropods.

Throughout the course of their evolution, sauropodomorphs never evolved the ability to chew. Scientists have inferred this from the relatively simple jaw joints they possessed. Chewing requires a relatively complex jaw morphology to allow the jaws to flex along multiple planes of motion in order to achieve the grinding action that makes chewing possible, and no sauropodomorph skulls appear to preserve the ability to perform this range of motion. This inability to chew distinguishes sauropodomorphs from large herbivorous mammals and also from the large herbivorous ornithischians with which they coexisted. Some scientists have suggested that the long necks of sauropodomorphs imposed constraints on the evolution of their heads which prevented the robust jaws and musculature necessary to evolve the ability to chew. Over the course of their evolution, sauropodomorphs evolved other methods of assisting with the digestion of large amounts of plant matter.

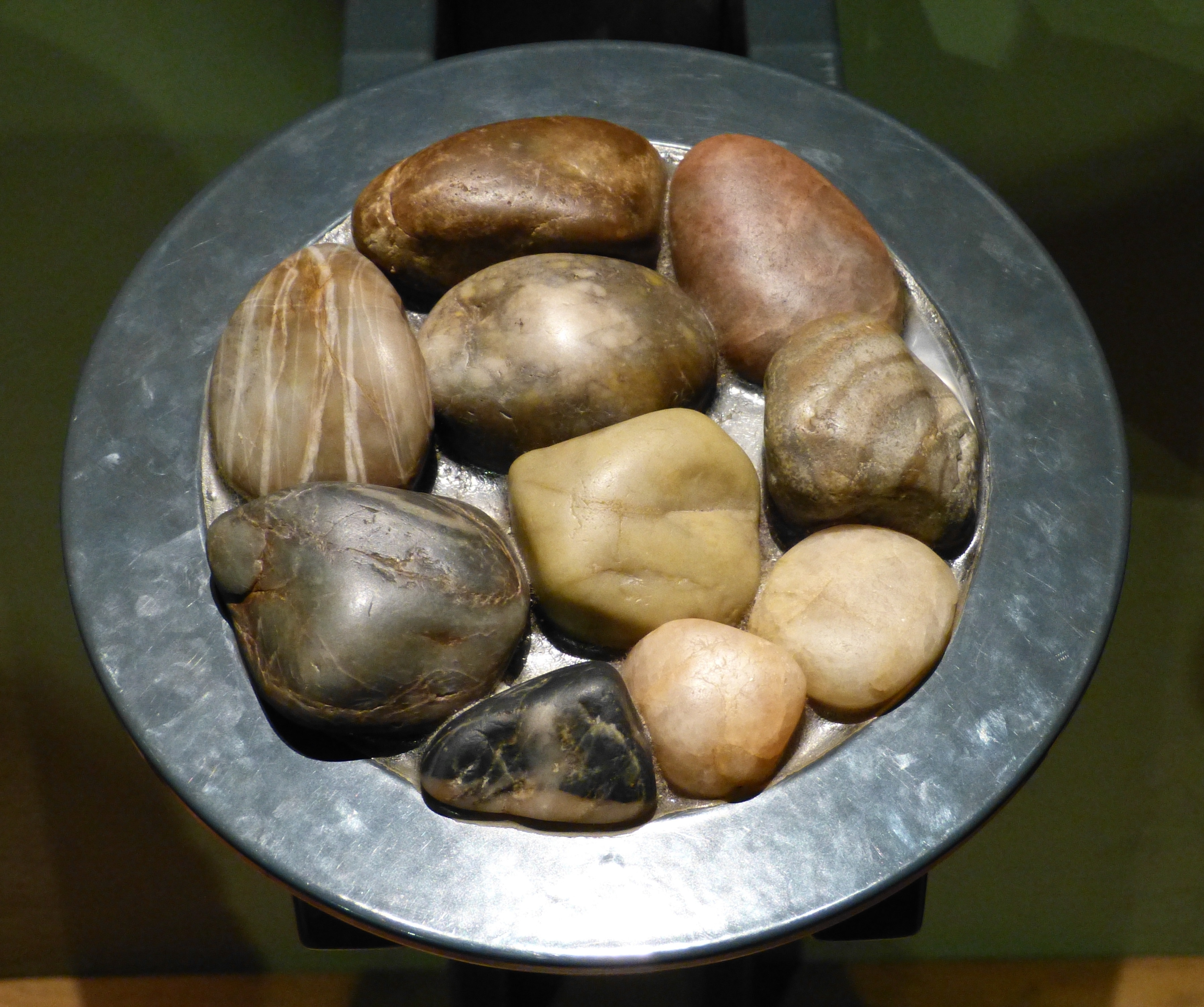
Gastroliths believed to belong to a sauropod on display in Vienna

One method that may have evolved to circumvent the inability to chew was the use of gastroliths (literally "stomach stones") in which animals deliberately swallow small stones to grind and process plant matter after it has been swallowed. Gastroliths are known to have been used by a variety of animal groups including plesiosaurs, birds, and other non-avian dinosaurs. Gastroliths can be difficult to distinguish from other rocks in the fossil record, but they are generally smooth and relatively uniform in size within a single animal. The presence of gastroliths in sauropodomorphs had evolved by the Early Jurassic because several taxa including Massospondylus and Ammosaurus (possibly a junior synonym of Anchisaurus) have been found with stones preserved inside their body cavities that are believed to be gastroliths. However, this adaptation was not necessarily widespread among prosauropods. Members of Plateosauridae are well represented in the fossil record—being known from hundreds of specimens—but there are few unambiguous examples of gastroliths preserved in these fossils. Some authors have suggested that the use of gastroliths did not become widespread until after the common ancestor of Massospondylidae and Sauropoda had already diverged from their common ancestor with Plateosauridae.

Subsequent review of the function of gastroliths in a wide variety of extant and extinct taxa has called into question the interpretation of gastroliths in non-avian taxa as serving a digestive function. Oliver Wings, in a 2007 publication, recounted that previous authors suggested they may have served to assist in balance for bipedal sauropodomorphs. However, the total mass of the gastroliths discovered associated with bipedal sauropodomorphs was probably too low to have any impact on their balance. These gastroliths may have simply been swallowed accidentally during feeding, which explains their rarity and inconsitence in their association with sauropodomorph fossils.

=== Metabolism and thermoregulation ===
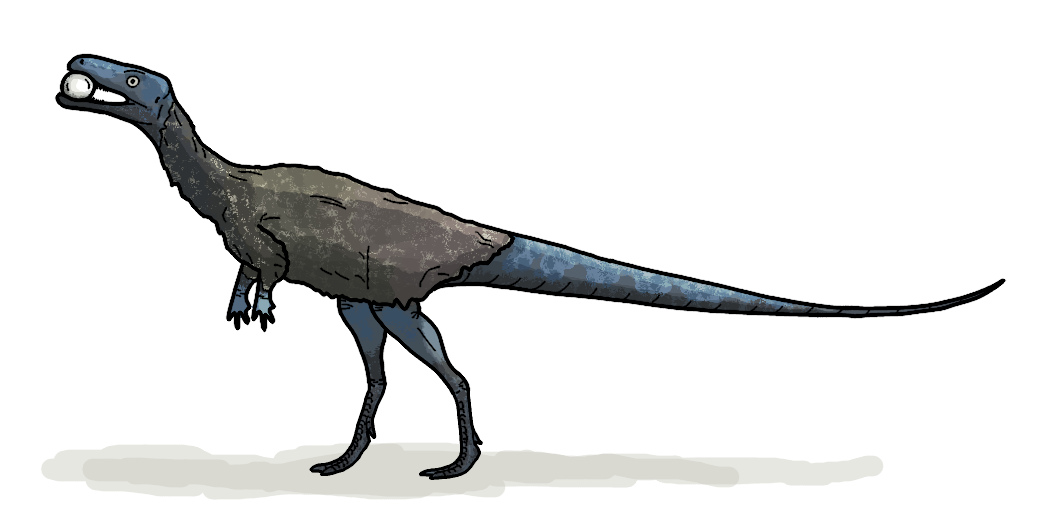
The basal sauropodomorph Pampadromaeus, here depicted with a speculative coat of feathers

Metabolic strategies in extant animals are quite varied and cannot be neatly categorized. The general distinction between ectothermy ("cold-bloodedness") and endothermy ("warm-bloodedness") is based on the dramatic metabolic differences between extant mammals and birds (which have very high metabolic rates) and modern reptiles, which have very slow metabolic rates by comparison. Some researchers have suggested that this simple dichotomy does not account for the full range of possible variation, especially in the fossil record, because they both represent derived metabolic conditions. Archosaurs (and possibly amniotes more generally) may have had significantly higher metabolic rates than modern crocodilians and squamates—a metabolic condition which is sometimes called mesothermy. It is unclear when the avian metabolic condition evolved, but it is believed to have been present in most theropods based on histological data.

The presence of feathers is often used as a proxy measure of an endothermic metabolism. Pterosaurs, theropods, and ornithischians are all known to have possessed feathers or feather-like filaments, which has led some researchers to suggest that feathers may have been an ancestral trait for bird-line archosaurs. If this is true, it would imply that sauropodomorphs were ancestrally feathered, which itself may have implied an endothermic (or at least moderately high) metabolism. However, researchers who have studied the question concluded that it is not likely, given the current evidence, that feathers were an ancestral trait for bird-line archosaurs, and it is more probable that feathers or filaments evolved independently in pterosaurs, theropods, and ornithischians. This implies that sauropodomorphs were ancestrally scaly.

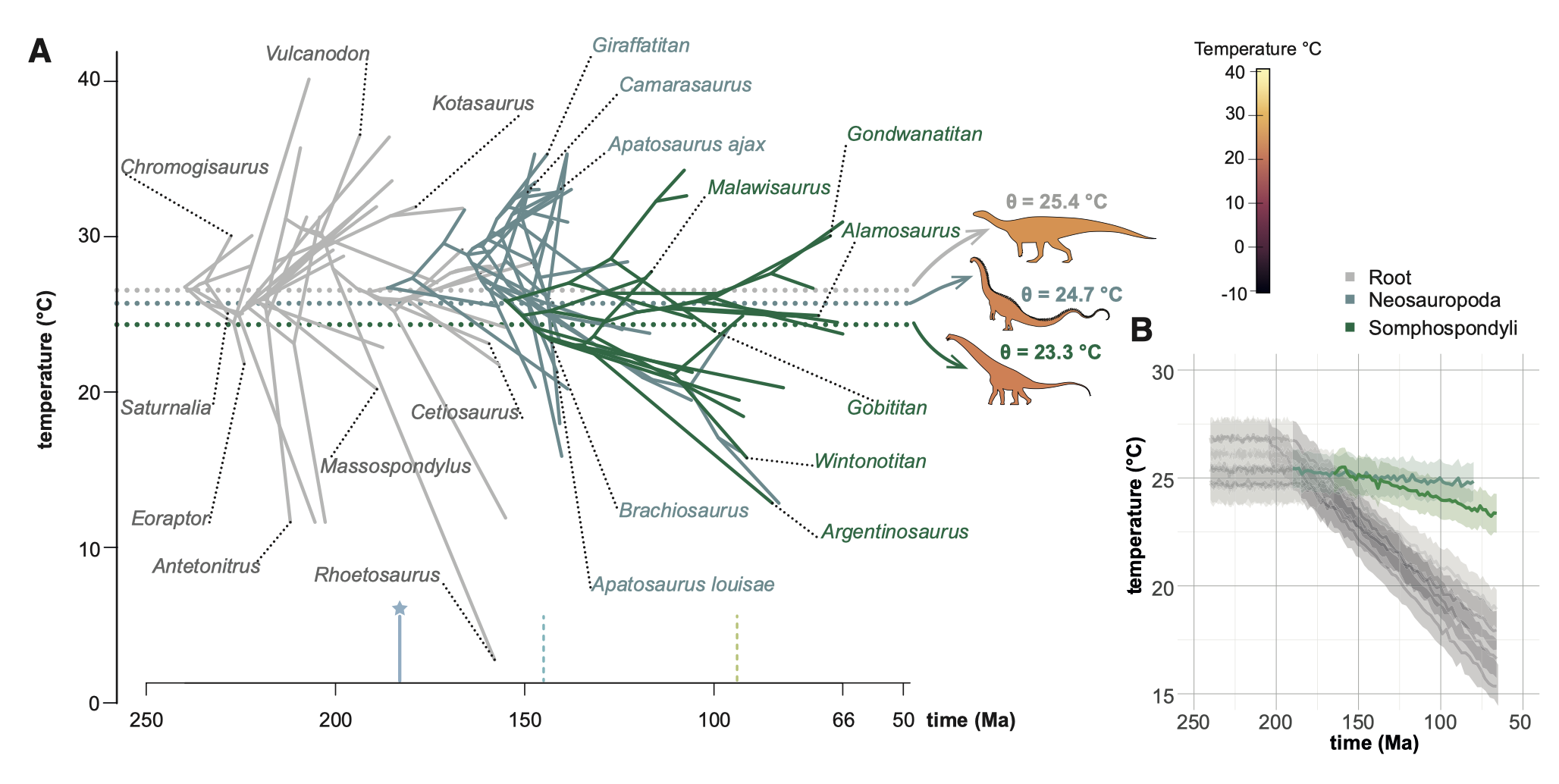
Evolutionary regimes along the temperature axis (in degrees C) are shown for Sauropodomorpha

Other proxies for metabolism in sauropodomorphs include inferences based on their paleobiogeography. Palynology and other plant fossils can be used to infer climatic data for various paleoenvironments in which sauropodomorphs were present. Global sampling of fossil data indicates that sauropodomorphs generally were more common at lower latitudes, which may be indicative of lower metabolic rates and a higher reliance on environmental conditions to maintain a high internal temperature. However, this correlation may also be non-causal because plant matter is also generally more abundant in lower latitudes and sauropodomorphs (due to their generally large size) would have needed much more plant matter to sustain their size regardless of their metabolic proclivities. This apparent sauropodomorph preference for lower latitudes could also reflect a sampling bias in the fossil record, and should not necessarily be interpreted as indicative of anything by itself. Some researchers have also used regression analyses of metabolic rates in extant vertebrates based on body mass to estimate that most dinosaurs, including sauropodomorphs, were mesotherms.

Some researchers have suggested that it would be impossible for animals as large as sauropods to exhibit endothermy because they were too large and would overheat. This was subsequently called into question by Eva Maria Griebeler, who used data from extant animals and from dinosaurs with known ontogenetic series and published mass estimates to approximate the internal temperatures of dinosaurs at various points in their lives. While her findings were not meant to determine precise body temperature estimates, she did find that the body temperature of large dinosaurs did not scale directly with their size beyond a certain mass, meaning that endothermic sauropods would not necessarily overheat. This finding did not conclusively determine whether or not sauropodomorphs were endotherms, but it did disprove the overheating hypothesis. Other authors have examined the skull vasculature of sauropods and found that the large antorbital fenestra present in most sauropod genera could have served as efficient sites for heat exchange. This meant that the brains of sauropods could be kept cooler than the rest of the body, and this temperature differential could have allowed for higher body temperatures to be non-lethal. Some researchers have also suggested a thermoregulatory role for the respiratory air sacs, but other researchers have dismissed these as lacking sufficient evidence.

=== Respiratory system ===
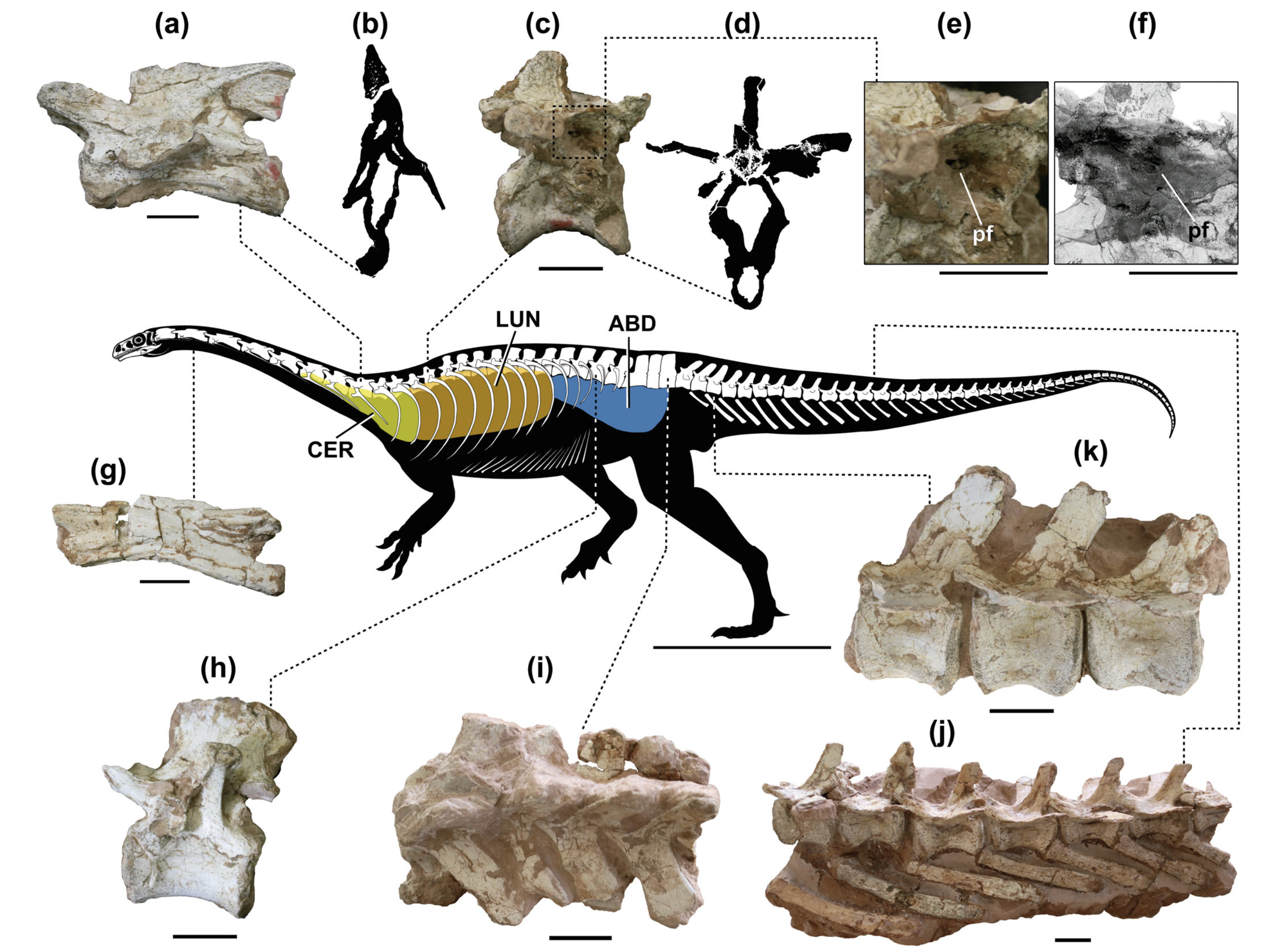
Skeletal reconstruction of the prosauropod Macrocollum, with the probable position of the lungs and air sacs illustrated

Because sauropodomorphs are only known from skeletal remains, any reconstruction of their respiratory system must be based on inferences drawn from its effects on the bones themselves. Living birds have a complex respiratory apparatus that differs considerably from mammals. Whereas mammal respiration is performed by lungs and the diaphragm, birds have multiple air sacs in addition to their lungs and these air sacs are incorporated into the skeleton through structures called pneumatic diverticula (singular "diverticulum"). Since modern birds and sauropodomorphs share a common ancestor, the structure of sauropodomorph bones can be used to infer the existence of analogous structures. Problems in making such inferences arise from the fact that numerous soft tissue structures—including muscles, nerves, and blood vessels—are incorporated into the skeletons of vertebrates, so it is not always clear which structures in extinct animals may have been caused by each of these organs. A review of the skeletal correlates in archosaur respiratory systems was publiushed by Patrick O'Connor in 2006 wherein he suggested that foraminae and fossae with large internal chambers are the most likely structures to be indicative of these invasive air sacs.

Sauropodomorphs likely had a heterogenous respiratory system. This means that there were multiple organs responsible for the process of respiration that served different functions. The lungs themselves would have been filled with the parenchymal tissues necessary for oxygen to diffuse into the blood. However, secondary organs, the air sacs, would have been involved in helping to circulate air through the lungs, but they probably lacked parenchymal tissues and would not have been used to absorb oxygen into the blood directly. This style of respiratory system is seen in modern birds and some squamates and was likely present in both sauropodomorphs and non-avian theropods. The lungs of sauropodomorphs were likely directly attached to the spine, which is evidenced by the presence of invasive tissues in the dorsal vertebrae which were possibly diverticula of the lungs themselves. Sauropodomorphs likely possessed large air sacs in front of and behind the lungs, which is the condition seen in modern birds. These are called the cervical (front) and abdominal (back) air sacs, respectively, and they would have assisted the circulation of air through the lungs in the absence of a diaphragm (which sauropodomorphs did not have). More advanced sauropods may have possessed additional air sacs in the head, tail, shoulder, and hip regions of the body, although this remains uncertain due to the difficulty in interpreting the presence of various pneumatic structures in their bones.

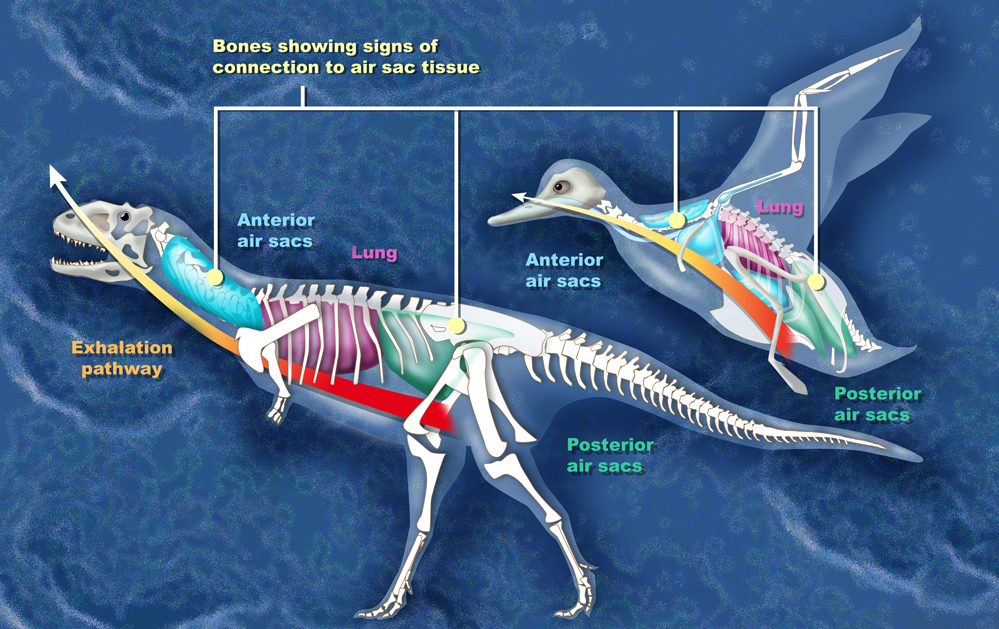
A diagram illustrating the flow-through lungs present in birds, and possibly also sauropodomorphs

The exact mechanism that sauropodomorphs used to breathe has been controversial among scientists. Birds are their closest living relatives, but the complex evolution of the avian respiratory apparatus—as shown by the wide variety of pneumatic structures seen in non-avian theropods—means that the avian respiratory condition may not have evolved before the theropod-sauropodomorph split. Some scientists have argued that sauropodomorphs, and non-avian dinosaurs generally, may have breathed in a manner more similar to crocodiles or turtles, which is more comparable to tidal breathing of mammals. Matthew Wedel published a review of the breathing capabilities of extinct archosaurs in 2009 and he concluded that, in order for any animal to possess an avian-like flow-through lung, in which fresh air enters the lungs during both inhalation and exhalation, it must have specific anatomical adaptations. These adaptations should include: lungs that function as tubes rather than sacs, air sacs both anterior and posterior to the lungs, and muscles capable of driving ventilation in a single direction. He noted that sauropodomorphs (and saurischians more broadly) probably possessed all of these adaptations. However, Wedel also noted that the presence of these does not necessarily mean that they must have breathed in this manner, just that it was possible. Absent any living members to observe, the exact manner of sauropodomorph breathing remains uncertain.

=== Gait and locomotion ===
The early evolution of saurodomorphs was marked by a change in leg proportions away from the cursorial adaptations which characterized basal genera like Buriolestes and Pampadromaeus. The first sauropodomorphs to achieve larger body sizes had already shifted away from this locomotor style — change which would only compound throughout the Triassic. Even after sauropodomorphs began increasing in size, they are believed to have remained obligate bipeds. Genera like Plateosaurus, Massospondylus, and their relatives had relatively short arms and wrists not capable of the protation movement necessary to plant them on the ground for locomotion. Later bipedal taxa, like Aardonyx, generally developed a more elongated body and longer arms. This evolutionary trend coincided with the development of more complex wrist anatomy that allowed some degree of pronation for the forelimbs, which is a necessary prerequisite for planting the hands on the ground to bear weight.

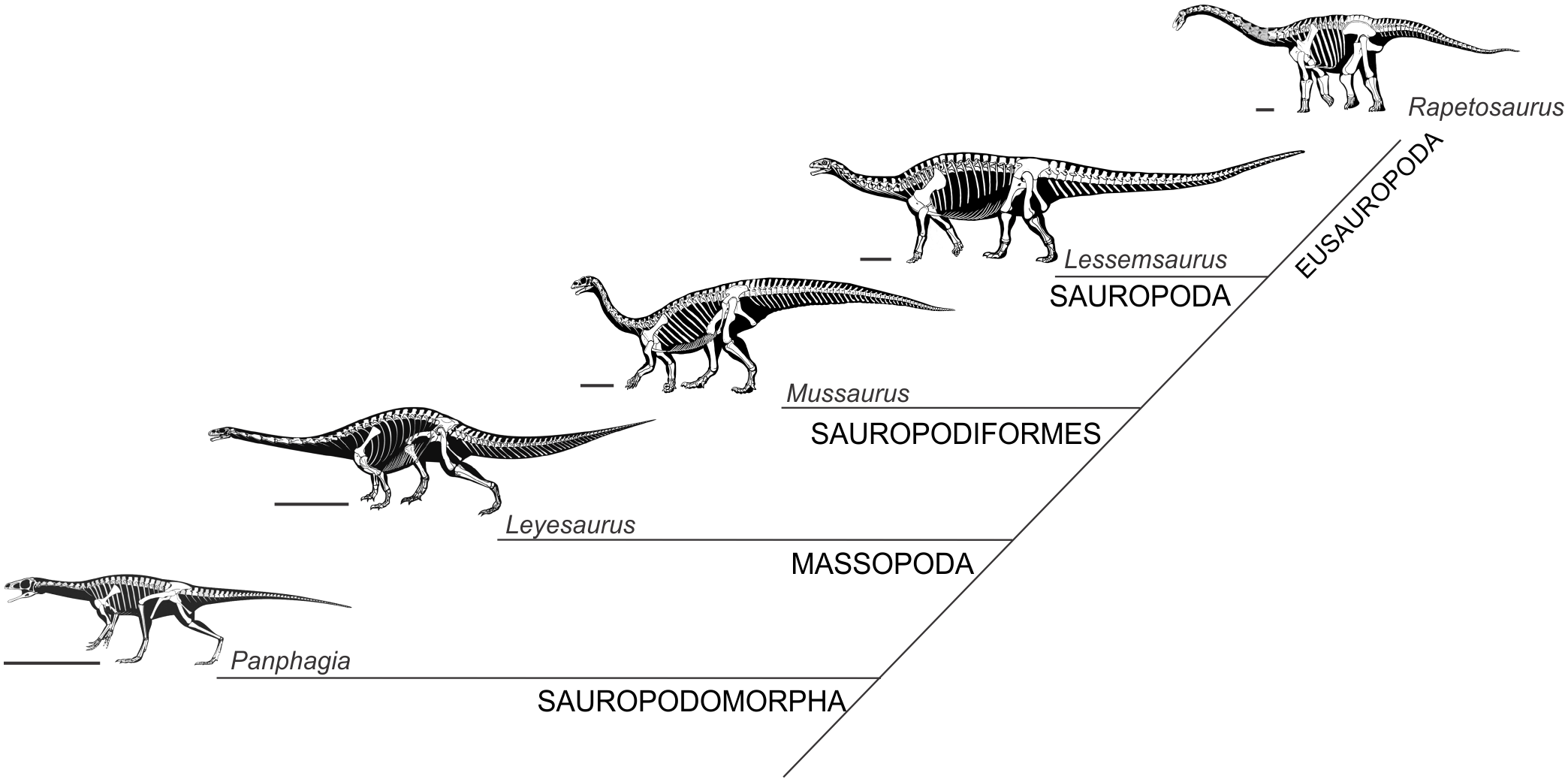
A simplified cladogram showing steps in the evolution of quadrupedality in sauropodomorphs

One of the few prosauropod taxa with direct evidence for quadrupedality is Mussaurus, which is known from multiple specimens of all ages (embyros, hatchlings, juvelines, and adults). Fully-grown Mussaurus individuals are fairly typical prosauropods; they have relatively short arms and were probably obligate bipeds. However, hatchling individuals possessed arms that were more-or-less the same length as their legs. Otero and colleagues modeled individuals of Mussaurus at various ages and determined that the center-of-mass of these hatchling individuals was about halfway down the length of the trunk. This is significantly anterior to the hips, suggesting that it was impossible for these hatchlings to walk bipedally, making them obligate quadrupeds. The prosauropod Massospondylus is also known from embryos, which have relatively long arms, similar to those of the embryos of Mussaurus. Suggestions of quadrupedality in young Massospondylus is complicated by the much simpler wrist anatomy of the taxon, which would have made wrist pronation impossible. However, trace fossils from the same locality as the Massospondylus embryos show clear evidence of quadrupedal locomotion, with hand imprints clearly distinct from footprints. These handprints show that the hands were rotated outwards (thus unpronated), suggesting that quadrupedality as a feature of prosauropod juveniles significantly predated the evolution of complex wrists.

It is not clear how many times quadrupedal locomotion evolved independently among adult sauropodomorphs, but Kimberly Chapelle and colleagues suggested in 2020 that this happened at least twice. The first of these occurrences would have been some time after the diversification of Massopoda but before the evolution of Mussaurus. This hypothesis implies that non-sauropod sauropodiformes like Anchisaurus and Riojasaurus were quadrupedal. At some point, bipedality re-evolved in taxa like Mussaurus and Yunnanosaurus, and then quadrupedality re-evolved at some point around the evolution of Melanorosaurus and Lessemsauridae. Other authors have suggested that quadrupedality only evolved once in sauropodomorphs. The evolution of the posterodistal tubercle on the radius has been suggested as a possible signifier for quadrupedality in sauropodomorphs. This feature is present on the radii of several taxa that are believed to have been bipedal, such as Aardonyx and Mussaurus, so this feature may not be a sufficient condition for quadrupedal locomotion. A curved (rather than straight) radius would likely have been necessary as a precondition for fully pronating the wrists.

== Classification ==
Sauropodomorpha is one of the two major clades within the order Saurischia. The sauropodomorphs' sister group, the Theropoda, includes bipedal carnivores like Velociraptor and Tyrannosaurus; as well as birds. However, sauropodomorphs also share a number of characteristics with the Ornithischia, so a small minority of palaeontologists, like Bakker, have historically placed both sets of herbivores within a group called "Phytodinosauria" or "Ornithischiformes". A summary of the possible classification schemes is shown below.

Conventional relationships

- Dinosauria
  - Ornithischia
  - Saurischia
    - Theropoda
    - Sauropodomorpha

Ornithoscelida hypothesis

- Dinosauria
  - Sauropodomorpha
  - Ornithoscelida
    - Theropoda
    - Ornithischia

Phytodinosauria hypothesis

- Dinosauria
  - Theropoda
  - Phytodinosauria
    - Ornithischia
    - Sauropodomorpha

In Linnaean taxonomy, Sauropodomorpha (which means "lizard feet forms") is either a suborder or is left unranked. It was originally established by Friedrich von Huene in 1932, who broke it into two groups: the basal forms within Prosauropoda, and their descendants, the giant Sauropoda.

Phylogenetic analyses by Adam Yates (2004, 2006) and others firmly placed Sauropoda within a paraphyletic "Prosauropoda". Recent cladistic analyses suggest that the clade Prosauropoda, which was named by Huene in 1920 and was defined by Sereno, in 1998, as all animals more closely related to Plateosaurus engelhardti than to Saltasaurus loricatus, is a junior synonym of Plateosauridae as both contain the same taxa.

Most modern classification schemes break the prosauropods into a half-dozen groups that evolved separately from one common lineage. While they have a number of shared characteristics, the evolutionary requirements for giraffe-like browsing high in the trees may have caused convergent evolution, where similar traits evolve separately because they faced the same evolutionary pressure, instead of (homologous) traits derived from a shared ancestor.

The phylogenetic analysis of Otero et al., 2015 found Sauropodomorpha to be in a polytomy with Agnosphitys and Theropoda within Eusaurischia, with Herrerasauridae and Eoraptor external to it within Saurischia. A large phylogenetic analysis of early dinosaurs published by Matthew Baron, David Norman and Paul Barrett (2017) in the journal Nature redefined Sauropodomorpha and Saurischia and recovered Herrerasauridae as the sister group to Sauropodomorpha within Saurischia. This resulted from the proposed removal of Theropoda from Saurischia and the formation of Ornithoscelida, a clade containing Theropoda and Ornithischia.

=== Phylogeny ===
Within Sauropodomorpha, there is a large clade named Plateosauria. The name Plateosauria was first coined by Gustav Tornier in 1913. The name afterwards fell out of use until the 1980s. Plateosauria is a node-based taxon. In 1998, Paul Sereno defined Plateosauria as the last common ancestor of Plateosaurus engelhardti and Massospondylus carinatus, and its descendants. Peter Galton and Paul Upchurch in 2004 used a different definition: the last common ancestor of Plateosaurus engelhardti and Jingshanosaurus xinwaensis, and its descendants. In their cladistic analysis the Plateosauria belonged to the Prosauropoda, and included the Plateosauridae subgroup. In Galton's and Upchurch's study also Coloradisaurus, Euskelosaurus, Jingshanosaurus, Massospondylus, Mussaurus, Sellosaurus, and Yunnanosaurus proved to be plateosaurians.

However, recent cladistic analyses suggest that the Prosauropoda as traditionally defined is paraphyletic to sauropods. Prosauropoda, as currently defined, is a synonym of Plateosauridae as both contain the same taxa by definition. The phylogenetic analysis of 2021 recovered Issi and Plateosaurus as the basal-most plateosaurs. Below is a cladogram of basal sauropodomorpha after Apaldetti and colleagues, 2021.

- Sauropodomorpha
  - Buriolestes
  - - Eoraptor
    - - Saturnaliidae
      - - Thecodontosaurus
        - - Efraasia
          - - Plateosauria
              - - - Plateosauridae
                  - Unaysauridae
                - - Massopoda
                    - - Riojasauridae
                      - - Massospondylidae
                        - - Sauropodiformes sensu lato
                            - - Yunnanosaurus
                              - - - Seitaad
                                  - - Chuxiongosaurus
                                    - Jingshanosaurus
                                - - Xingxiulong
                                  - - - Anchisaurus
                                      - Leonerasaurus
                                    - - Sauropodiformes sensu stricto
                                        - - Mussaurus
                                          - - Aardonyx
                                            - - Irisosaurus
                                              - - Melanorosaurus
                                                - Sauropoda

Massopoda is a clade of sauropodomorph dinosaurs within Sauropodomorpha which lived during the Late Triassic to Late Cretaceous epochs. It was named by paleontologist Adam M. Yates of the University of the Witwatersrand in 2007. Massopoda is a stem-based taxon, defined as all animals more closely related to Saltasaurus loricatus than to Plateosaurus engelhardti. The name Massopoda, from Latin massa 'lump'; from Ancient Greek πους (pous) 'foot', is also contraction of Massospondylidae and Sauropoda, two disparate taxa in the clade. Sauropodiformes is a more exclusive stem-based clade within Massopoda, defined as "the most inclusive clade containing Saltasaurus but not Massospondylus".

=== Subgroups ===
Below are the various subgroups of sauropodomorphs alongside their accompanying definitions.

Name	Named by	Definition	Notes
Anchisauria	Galton & Upchurch, 2004	Least inclusive clade containing both Anchisaurus and Melanorosaurus	
Bagualosauria	Langer et al., 2019	Least inclusive clade containing both Bagualosaurus and Saltasaurus	
Eusauropoda	Upchurch, 1995	Least inclusive clade containing both Shunosaurus and Saltasaurus	Given a formal definition by Upchurch et al., 2004
Gravisauria	Allain & Aquesbi, 2008	Least inclusive clade containing both Tazoudasaurus and Saltasaurus	
Massopoda	Yates, 2007	Most inclusive clade containing Saltasaurus, but not Plateosaurus	
Plateosauria	Sereno, 1998	Least inclusive clade containing both Plateosaurus and Massospondylus	
Prosauropoda	Huene, 1920	Most inclusive clade containing Plateosaurus but not Saltasaurus	Phylogenetic definition given by Sereno in 2005, this definition may be synonymous with Plateosauridae
Sauropoda	Marsh, 1878	Most inclusive clade containing Saltasaurus but not Melanorosaurus; least inclusive clade containing both Vulcanodon and Eusauropoda	Alternative definitions given by Yates, 2007 and Langer et al., 2010, formerly defined as the most inclusive clade containing Saltasaurus but not Plateosaurus (this clade is now called Massopoda)
Sauropodiformes	Sereno, 2007	Least inclusive clade containing Mussaurus and Saltasaurus	Alternatively defined by McPhee et al., 2014 as the most inclusive clade containing Saltasaurus but not Massospondylus
Sauropodomorpha	Huene, 1932	Most inclusive clade containing Diplodocus but not Triceratops or the house sparrow; most inclusive clade containing Saltasaurus but not Allosaurus or Iguanodon	Formal definition given by Sereno, 2007; definition sometimes includes Herrerrasaurus as a defining taxon

== Evolutionary history and paleobiogeography ==
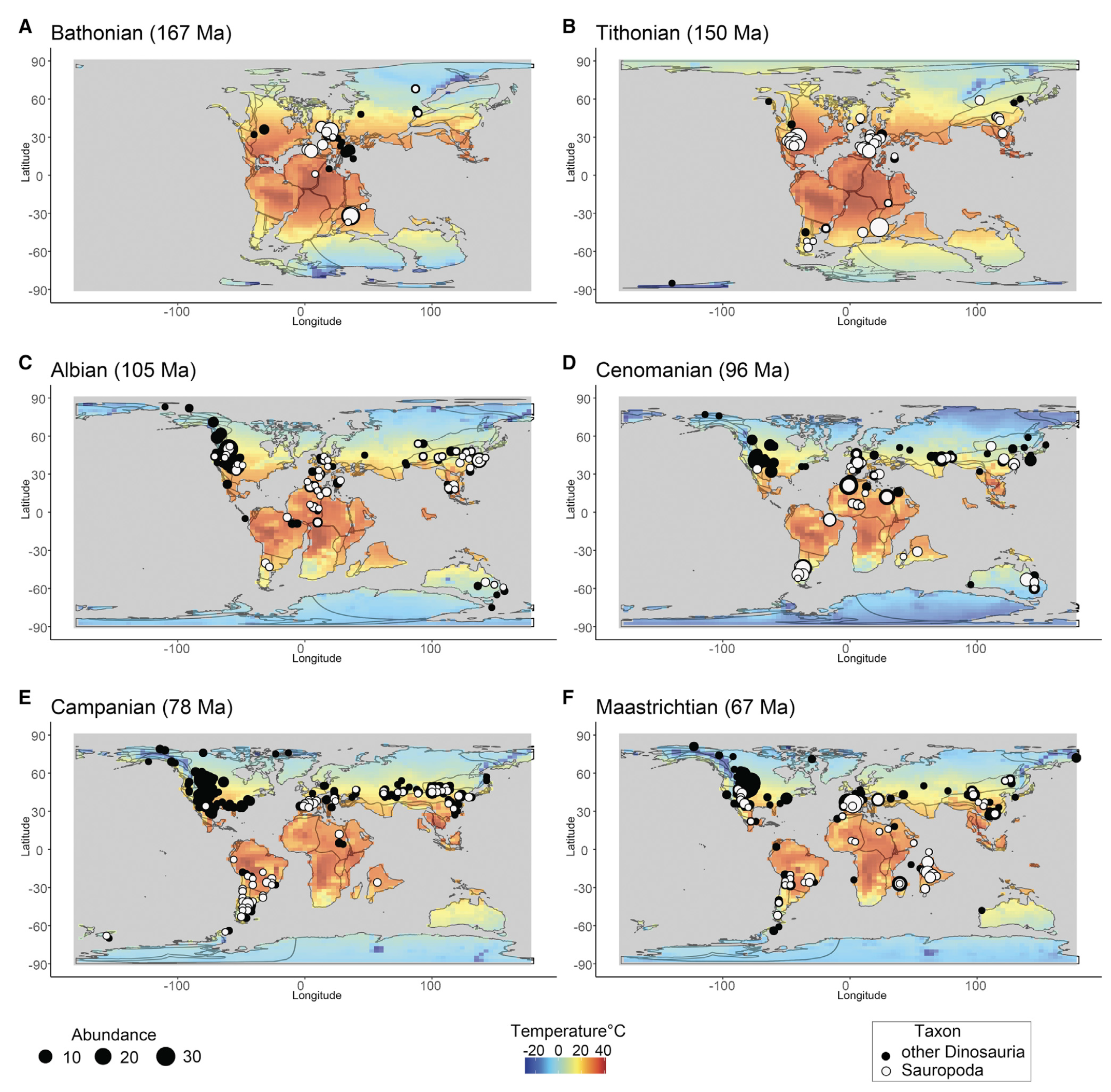
Maps of the world during various points of the Mesozoic with sauropod remains indicated by white dots

Among the first dinosaurs to evolve in the Late Triassic period, about 230 million years ago (Mya), they became the dominant herbivores by halfway through the late Triassic (during the Norian stage). Their perceived decline in the early Cretaceous is most likely a bias in fossil sampling, as most fossils are known from Europe and North America, but sauropods were still the dominant herbivores in the Gondwanan landmasses. The spread of flowering plants (angiosperms) and "advanced" ornithischians, another major group of herbivorous dinosaurs (noted for their highly developed chewing mechanisms), are most likely not a major factor in sauropod decline in the northern continents. Like all non-avian dinosaurs (birds), the sauropodomorphs became extinct 66 Mya, during the Cretaceous–Paleogene extinction event.

The earliest and most basal sauropodomorphs known are Chromogisaurus novasi and Panphagia protos, both from the Ischigualasto Formation, dated to 231.4 million years ago (late Carnian age of the Late Triassic according to the ICS). Some studies have found Eoraptor lunensis (also from the Ischigualasto Formation), traditionally considered a theropod, to be an early member of the sauropodomorph lineage, which would make it the most basal sauropodomorph known.

Sauropodomorph remains have been found on every continent, including Antarctica. They evolved during the existence of the supercontinent Pangaea, and are believed to have been widespread on this landmass prior to its separation into multiple continents. However, multiple intercontinental dispersal events are believed to have occurred after Pangaea began to separate, resulting in the widespread proliferation of true sauropods after they evolved. Sauropods themselves are also known from every continent, including Antarctica.
