= Cranial fossa =

Depression in the cranial cavity

- Three cranial fossae and its boundaries. Purple: Anterior cranial fossa Blue: Middle cranial fossa Green: Posterior cranial fossa Boundaries; 1: Sphenoidal limbus (anterior margin of the chiasmatic groove); 2: Posterior borders of the lesser wings of the sphenoid 3: Dorsum sellae of the sphenoid bone 4: Superior borders of the petrous part of the temporal bone 5: Groove for transverse sinus of the occipital bone

Identifiers
- FMA: 321144

A cranial fossa is formed by the floor of the cranial cavity.

There are three distinct cranial fossae:

- Anterior cranial fossa (fossa cranii anterior), housing the projecting frontal lobes of the brain
- Middle cranial fossa (fossa cranii media), separated from the posterior fossa by the clivus and the petrous crest housing the temporal lobe
- Posterior cranial fossa (fossa cranii posterior), between the foramen magnum and tentorium cerebelli, containing the brainstem and cerebellum

== Additional images ==
Animation.

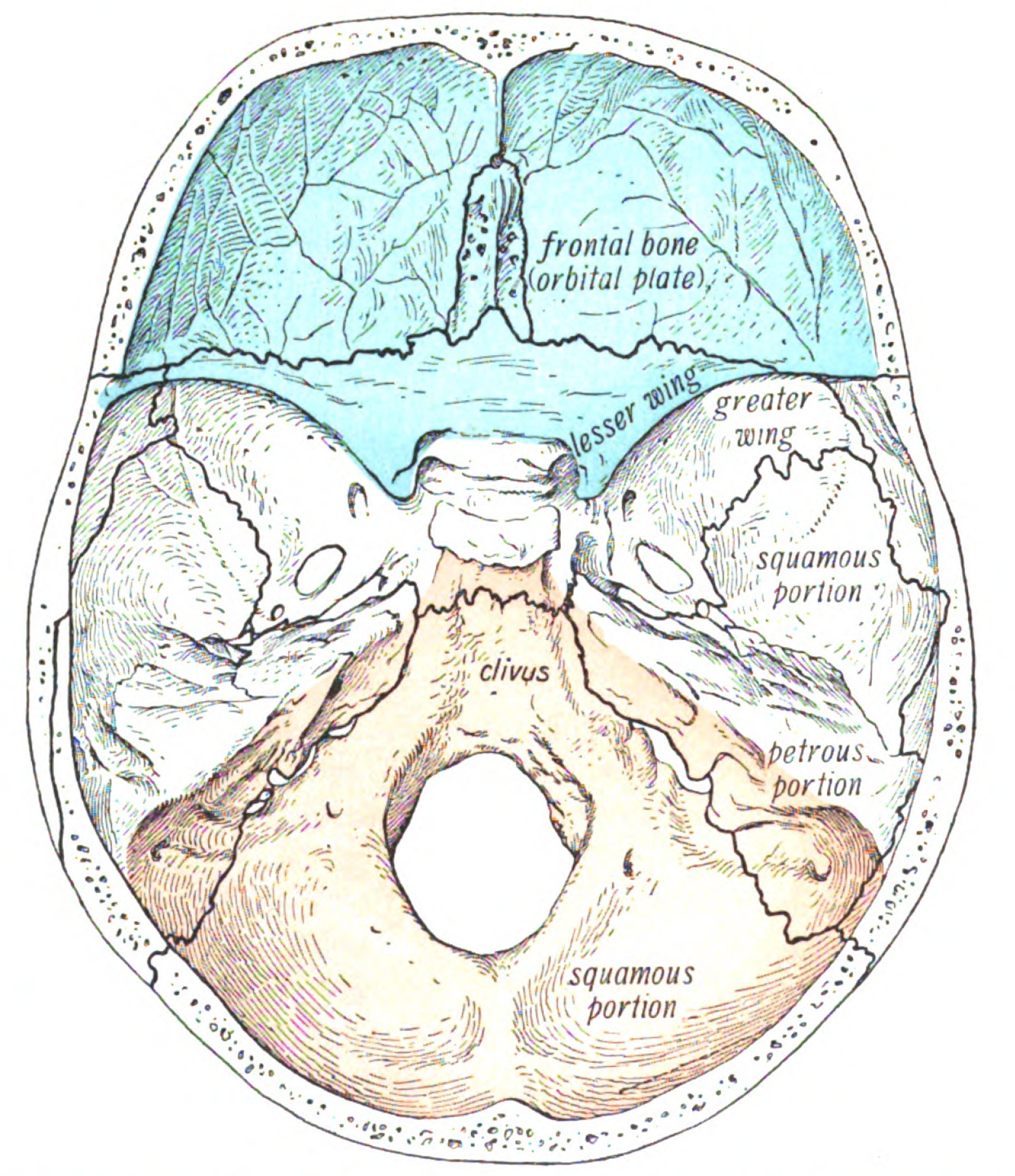
Illustration.

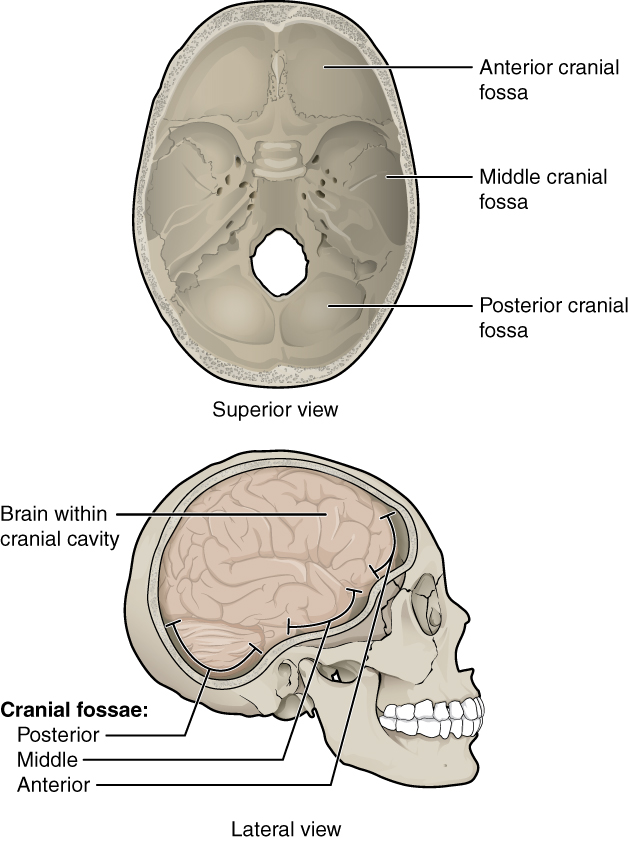
Superior view and lateral view.

== See also ==
- Anatomical terms of location § Cranial and caudal
- Fossa (anatomy)
