= Fossa (anatomy) =

Depression or hollow, usually in a bone

Details

Identifiers
- Latin: fossa
- TA98: A02.0.00.034
- FMA: 45791

In anatomy, a fossa (/ˈfɒsə/; pl.: fossae (/ˈfɒsiː/ or /ˈfɒsaɪ/); from Latin 'ditch, trench') is a depression or hollow, usually in a bone, such as the hypophyseal fossa (the depression in the sphenoid bone). Some examples include:

In the skull:

- Cranial fossae
  - Anterior cranial fossa
  - Middle cranial fossa
    - Interpeduncular fossa
  - Posterior cranial fossa
- Hypophyseal fossa
- Temporal bone fossae
  - Mandibular fossa
  - Jugular fossa
- Infratemporal fossa
- Pterygopalatine fossa
- Pterygoid fossa
- Lacrimal fossae
  - Fossa for lacrimal gland
  - Fossa for lacrimal sac
- Scaphoid fossa
- Condyloid fossa
- Rhomboid fossa

In the mandible:

- Retromolar fossa

In the torso:

- Fossa ovalis (heart)
- Infraclavicular fossa
- Pyriform fossa
- Substernal fossa
- Iliac fossa
- Ovarian fossa
- Paravesical fossa
- Coccygeal fossa
- Navicular fossae
  - Navicular fossa of male urethra
  - Fossa of vestibule of vagina
- Ischioanal fossa

In the upper limb:

- Supraclavicular fossa
- Radial fossa
- On the scapula:
  - Glenoid fossa
  - Supraspinous fossa
  - Infraspinous fossa
  - Subscapular fossa
- Cubital fossa (a.k.a. Antecubital fossa or chelidon)
- Olecranon fossa

In the lower limb:

- Fossa ovalis (thigh)
- Trochanteric fossa
- Acetabular fossa
- Popliteal fossa
- Intercondyloid fossae
  - Anterior intercondyloid fossa
  - Posterior intercondyloid fossa
- Intercondylar fossa of femur

== See also ==
- Foramen
