= Paravesical fossa =

Depression in the pelvic wall due to the bladder

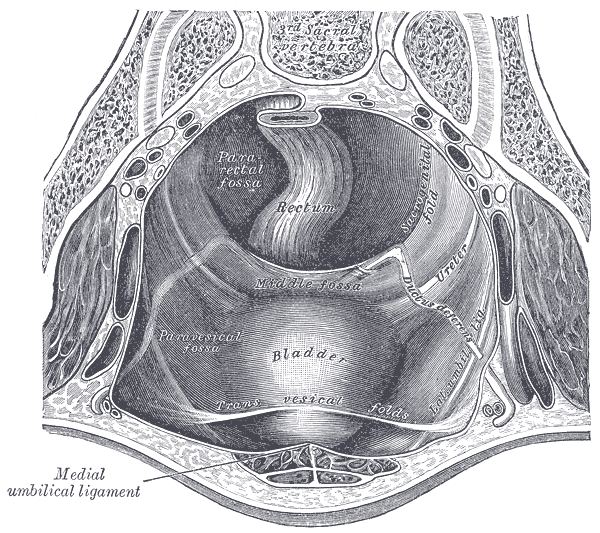
- The peritoneum of the male pelvis. (The urinary bladder is the swelling at the center, and the paravesical fossa is visible on the right and left of it, though it is only labeled on the left.)

Details

Identifiers
- Latin: fossa paravesicalis
- TA98: A10.1.02.502
- TA2: 3723
- FMA: 16546

The peritoneum of the anterior pelvic wall covers the superior surface of the bladder, and on either side of this viscus forms a depression, termed the paravesical fossa, which is limited laterally by the fold of peritoneum covering the ductus deferens.

The size of this fossa is dependent on the state of distension of the bladder; when the bladder is empty, a variable fold of peritoneum, the plica vesicalis transversa, divides the fossa into two portions.
