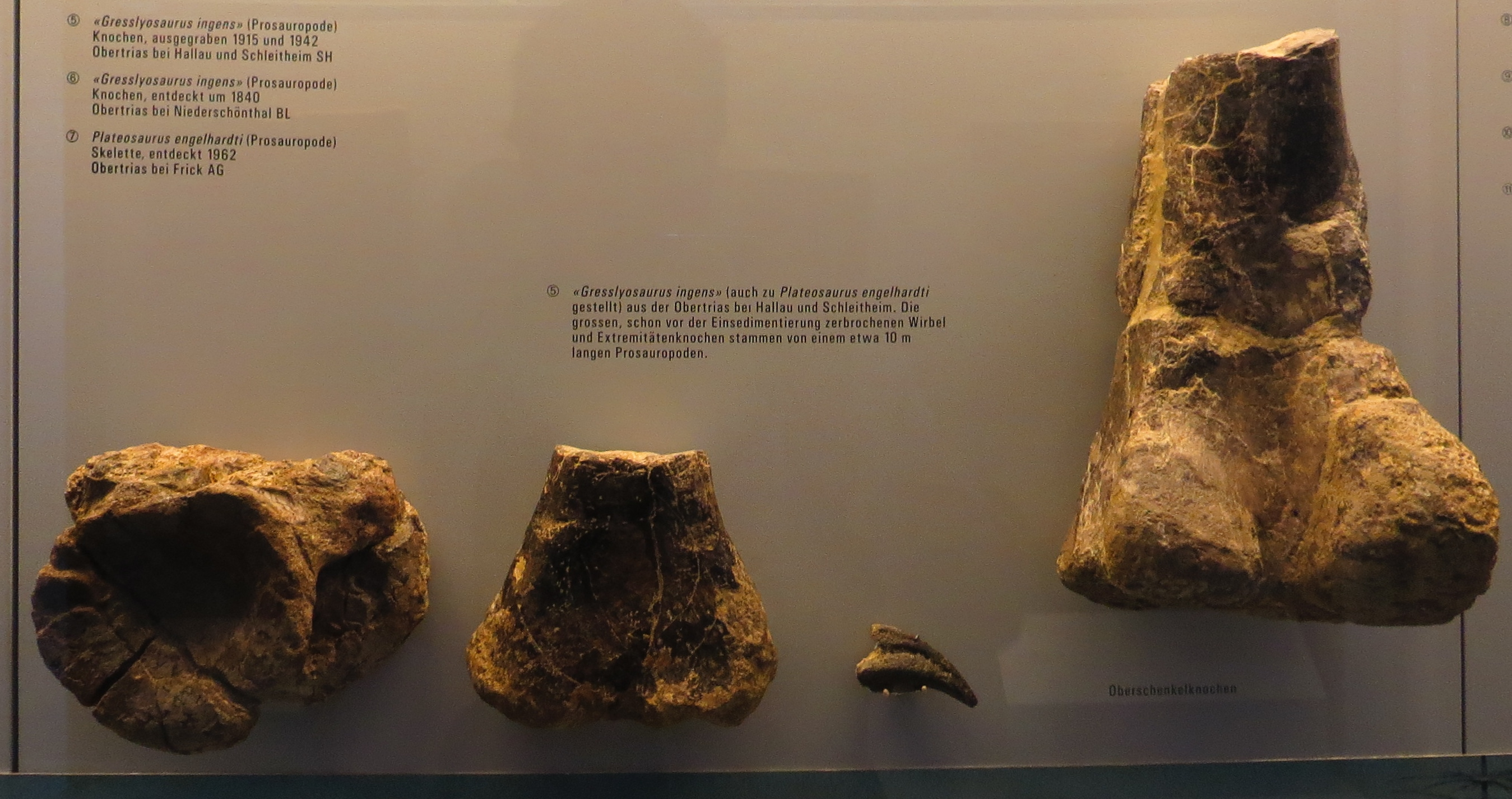
- Gresslyosaurus ingens holotype

Scientific classification
- Domain: Eukaryota
- Kingdom: Animalia
- Phylum: Chordata
- Clade: Dinosauria
- Clade: Saurischia
- Clade: †Sauropodomorpha
- Family: †Plateosauridae
- Genus: †Gresslyosaurus; Rütimeyer, 1857

Type species
- †Gresslyosaurus ingens Rütimeyer, 1857

Other species
- †G. plieningeri Huene, 1905; †G. robustus Huene, 1905; †G. torgeri Jaekel, 1911

Synonyms
- Dinosaurus Rütimeyer, 1856 (nomen nudum); Plateosaurus plieningeri Huene, 1905

= Gresslyosaurus =

Gresslyosaurus Temporal range: Late Triassic, ~214–204 Ma

Prosauropod dinosaur

Gresslyosaurus (meaning "Amanz Gressly's lizard") is a genus of plateosaurian sauropodomorph dinosaur that lived during the Late Triassic period, around 214 to 204 million years ago, in France, Germany, Norway, Greenland and Switzerland.

== Discovery and naming ==
The holotype of G. ingens, NMB BM 1, 10, 24, 53, 530-1, 1521, 1572-74, 1576-78, 1582, 1584-85, 1591, consists of postcranial remains discovered in the Late Triassic (late Norian-Rhaetian) Trossingen Formation or Knollenmergel Formation of northern Switzerland around 1840 by Amanz Gressly, with more of the holotype being found between 1915 and 1942 by an unknown collector. G. ingens was named and described by Rütimeyer (1857).

The most complete remains of G. plieningeri were collected from the Marnes de Châlins Formation of France between 1982 and 1994, and the holotype, SMNS 80664, a set of postcrania, was collected from the Trossingen Formation of Germany by Pleininger in 1847. G. plieningeri was named and described by Huene (1905).

The holotype of G. robustus, UT (GPIT) B, a set of postcrania, was collected from the Trossingen Formation of Germany by Quenstedt in 1879. G. robustus was named and described by Huene (1905).

The holotype of G. torgeri, HMN MB III, a set of postcrania, was collected from a Plateosaurus bonebed within the Trossingen Formation of Germany by Jaeckel in 1909 or 1910. G. torgeri was named and described by Jaeckel (1911).

== Taxonomy ==
Gresslyosaurus was originally dubbed "Dinosaurus gresslyi" by Rütimeyer (1856) on the basis of postcranial remains discovered in the Late Triassic (late Norian-Rhaetian) Knollenmergel of northern Switzerland, but that name is a nomen nudum as it was described in an abstract. Dinosaurus was already in use for a therapsid, so Rütimeyer (1857) formally described the material as Gresslyosaurus ingens.

Lydekker (1888) synonymized Gresslyosaurus with Zanclodon, but von Huene (1908) removed sauropodomorph material assigned to Zanclodon (which he assigned to Theropoda) and Gresslyosaurus along with Plateosaurus as sauropodomorphs.

A number of authors (e.g. Steel 1970) listed Gresslyosaurus as valid, but Galton (1976, 1985, 1986) synonymized it with Plateosaurus based on comparisons with Plateosaurus material from Germany. Moser (2003), however, found Gresslyosaurus to be generically distinct from Plateosaurus, and in their description of Schleitheimia, Rauhut et al. (2020) found a number of differences between Schleitheimia and Gresslyosaurus.

== Relationship to Gressly ==
In his 1865 book Die Urwelt der Schweiz, Oswald Heer notes that Amanz Gressly, who had been admitted to an asylum in the final years of his life, had become tormented by hallucinations that he had transformed into the Gresslyosaurus, his namesake dinosaur.
