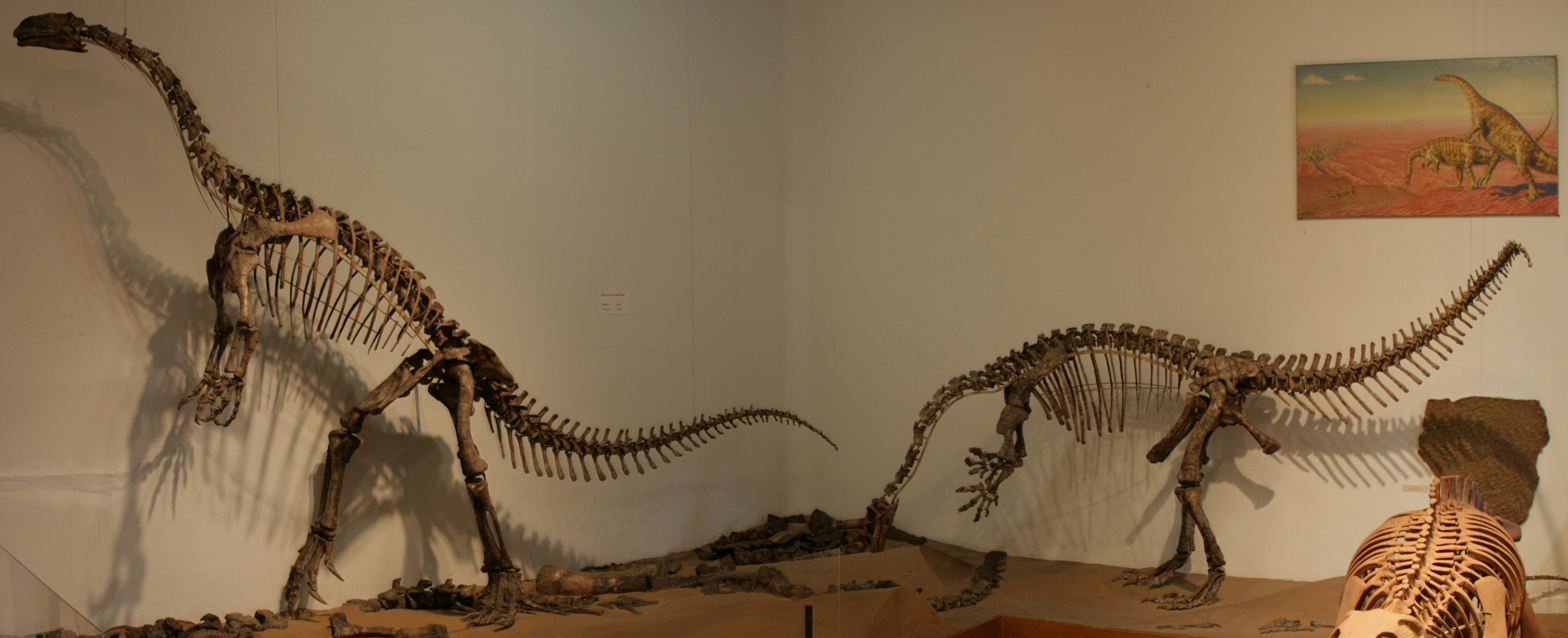
- Mounted skeletons of Plateosaurus longiceps from the Trossingen Formation of southern Germany, mounted in the Institute for Geosciences Tübingen

Scientific classification
- Kingdom: Animalia
- Phylum: Chordata
- Class: Reptilia
- Clade: Dinosauria
- Clade: Saurischia
- Clade: †Sauropodomorpha
- Clade: †Plateosauria
- Family: †Plateosauridae; Marsh, 1895

Type species
- †Plateosaurus trossingensis Fraas, 1913

Genera
- †Euskelosaurus; †Gresslyosaurus; †Issi; †Pachysauriscus?; †Plateosaurus; †Yimenosaurus

Synonyms
- Sellosauridae Huene, 1908; Prosauropoda Huene, 1920

= Plateosauridae =

Plateosaurids Temporal range: Late Triassic-Early Jurassic, 228–190 Ma

Extinct family of dinosaurs

Plateosauridae is a family of plateosaurian sauropodomorphs from the Late Triassic of Europe, Greenland, Africa and Asia. Although several dinosaurs have been classified as plateosaurids over the years, the family Plateosauridae is now restricted to Plateosaurus, Yimenosaurus, Euskelosaurus, and Issi. In another study, Yates (2003) sunk Sellosaurus into Plateosaurus (as P. gracilis). Gresslyosaurus is alternatively considered its own genus or a synonym of Plateosaurus.

== Classification ==
Plateosauridae, which was first named by Othniel Charles Marsh in 1895, is a stem-based taxon and it was defined by Sereno, 1998 as all animals more closely related to Plateosaurus engelhardti than to Massospondylus carinatus. Galton and Upchurch, 2004 proposed the following definition: all animals more closely related to Plateosaurus engelhardti than to Massospondylus carinatus and Yunnanosaurus huangi. Yates, 2007 defined it as all animals more closely related to Plateosaurus engelhardti than to Diplodocus longus. Recent cladistic analyses suggest that the clade Prosauropoda, which was named by Huene in 1920 and was defined by Sereno, 1998 as all animals more closely related to Plateosaurus engelhardti than to Saltasaurus loricatus, is a synonym of Plateosauridae as both contain the same taxa. Plateosauridae was recovered as a monophyletic group in the large phylogenetic analysis of early dinosaurs that was presented by Baron, Norman & Barrett (2017) in the journal Nature. In this analysis, the group was found to be sister to Massopoda within the clade Plateosauria. The 2021 study by Beccari et al. describing Issi saaneq recovered it as the sister taxon of Plateosaurus. Their phylogenetic analyses also recovered Macrocollum and Unaysaurus within the Plateosauridae. The results of their phylogenetic analyses are shown in the cladogram below:

- - Chromogisaurus
  - Pampadromaeus
  - Panphagia
  - Saturnalia
  - - Guaibasaurus
    - - Pantydraco
      - - Thecodontosaurus
        - - Efraasia
          - - Plateosauravus
            - - Ruehleia
              - - - Plateosauridae
                    - - Macrocollum
                      - Unaysaurus
                    - - Issi
                      - - Plateosaurus gracilis
                        - Plateosaurus trossingensis
                  - - - Riojasaurus
                      - Eucnemosaurus
                    - - Massopoda
