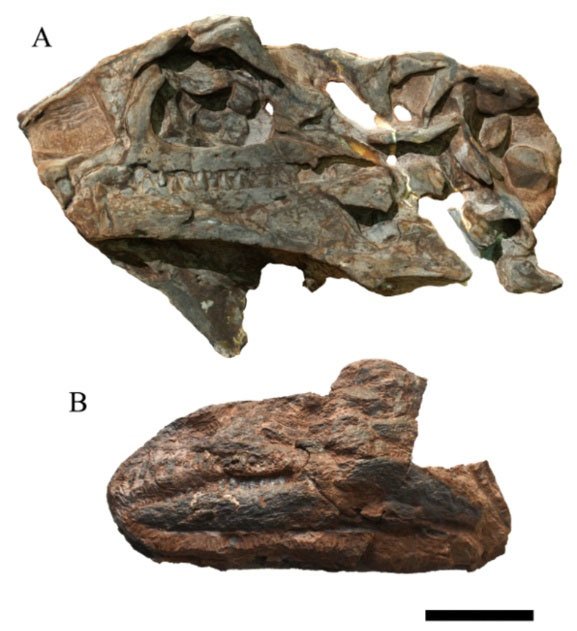
- Skulls of the holotype and paratype

Scientific classification
- Kingdom: Animalia
- Phylum: Chordata
- Class: Reptilia
- Clade: Dinosauria
- Clade: Saurischia
- Clade: †Sauropodomorpha
- Family: †Plateosauridae
- Genus: †Issi; Beccari et al., 2021
- Species: †I. saaneq

Binomial name
- †Issi saaneq Beccari et al., 2021

= Issi =

Issi Temporal range: Late Triassic (Norian), 225 Ma

Extinct genus of dinosaurs

Issi (meaning "cold" in Greenlandic) is a plateosaurid dinosaur from the Late Triassic Fleming Fjord Formation of Greenland. It contains one species, Issi saaneq; the full binomial name means "cold bone". Fossils of Issi were previously assigned to the species Plateosaurus trossingensis, but new finds allowed for a reassessment of that material that showed that it possessed features thought to be exclusive to Brazilian sauropodomorphs such as Unaysaurus and Macrocollum. This ultimately led to the designation of Issi as a distinct genus in 2021. This taxon is the first non-avian dinosaur described from Greenland.

== Discovery ==
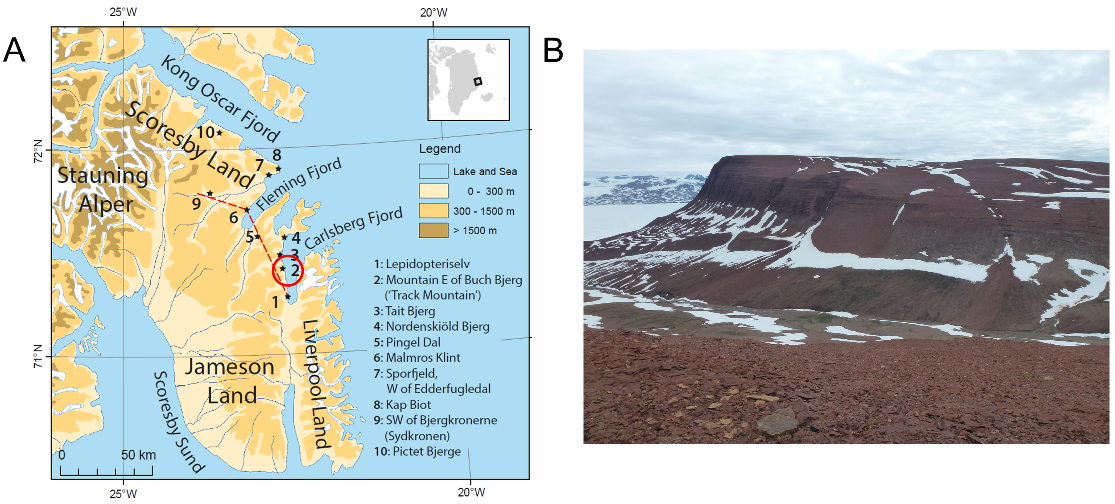
Topographic map of Jameson Land and outcrops in Buch Bjerg

On 27 July 1991, at the east coast of Greenland, on Jameson Land, in the Iron Cake site on the northern slope of the MacKnight Bjerg near the Flemingfjord, by William W. Amaral, William R. Downs, Stephen M. Gatesy, Neil H. Shubin and Niels Bonde, members of a team from Harvard University headed by Farish Jenkins, a skull was uncovered of a basal sauropodomorph. In 1994, the find was reported in the scientific literature and referred to Plateosaurus engelhardti. In 2018, the correctness of this assignment was doubted. In 1995, a skull was discovered of a smaller juvenile animal. In 2012, an additional three skeletons were excavated. After a CAT-scan by Marco Marzola, Filippo Rotatori and Alexandra Fernandes of the first two finds, followed by a digital deformation, it was concluded in a master's thesis by Victor Beccari that they represented a taxon new to science.

In 2021, the type species Issi saaneq was named and described by Victor Beccari Dieguez Campo, Octávio Mateus, Oliver Wings, Jesper Milàn and Lars Bjørn Clemmensen. The generic name means "cold" and the specific name "bone", both in Kalaallisut, a reference to the fact that it was the most northern basal sauropodomorph ever discovered.

The holotype, NHMD 164741, was found in a layer of the Malmros Klint Formation of the Fleming Fjord Group, dating from the middle Norian. It consists of a relatively complete skull with lower jaws and teeth. It is the exemplar found in 1994. It mainly lacks parts of the right side and the rear side of the right lower side. The skull is partly articulated. It represents a later stage juvenile or subadult individual.

The paratype is specimen NHMD 164758, found in 1995 in the same layer. It consists of a skull with lower jaws, more complete than the holotype. It only lacks the rear right corner of the skull roof. It represents a medium stage juvenile, about a third shorter than the holotype. Both types are part of the collection of the Natural History Museum of Denmark. The three skeletons discovered in 2012, specimens NHMD 164734, GM.V 2013‐683 and NHMD 164775, were in 2021 not formally referred or described; the latter skeleton had even not been fully prepared yet. This limited the description to the head.

== Description ==
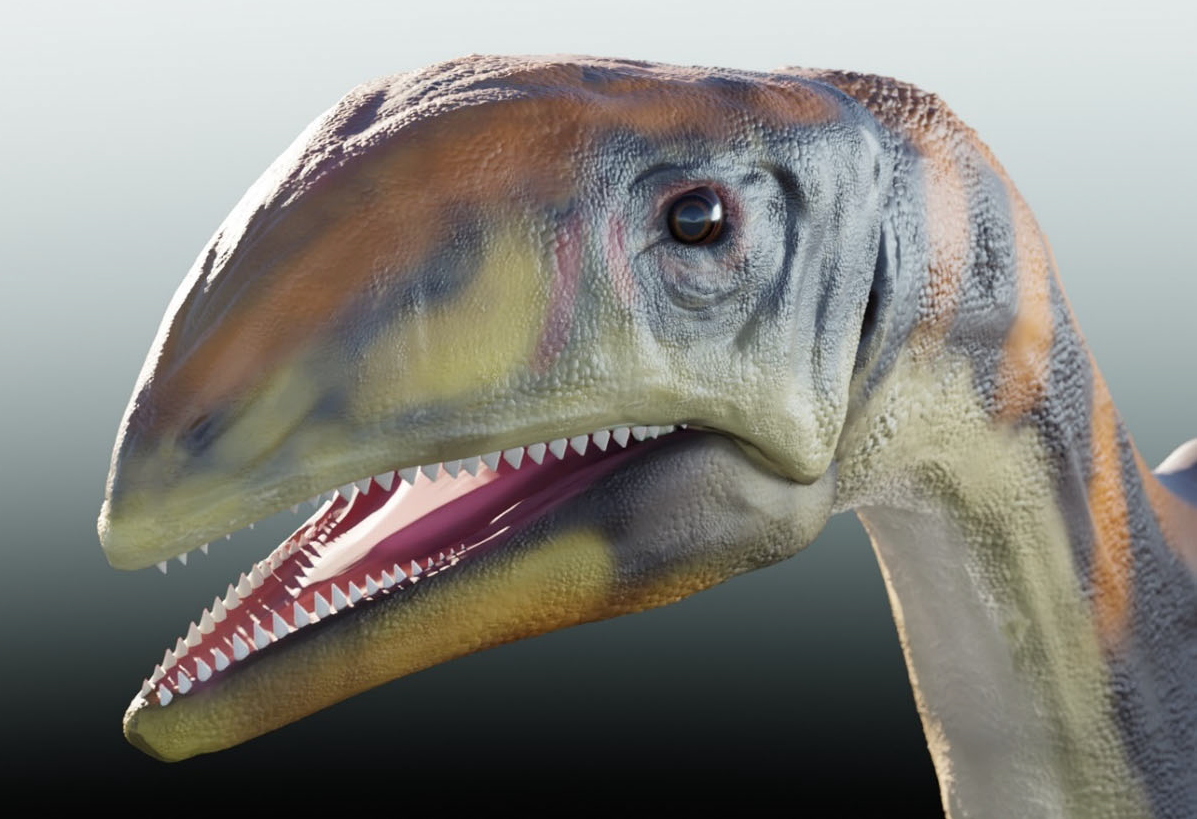
Life restoration

The skull of the holotype of Issi has a preserved length of 243.7 millimetres.

The describing authors in 2021 indicated some distinguishing traits. Four of these are autapomorphies, unique derived characters. The base of the main body of the premaxilla is pierced by a small foramen. The squamosal bone has a rear branch that is long horizontally. The quadrate bone is rather tall relative to the height of the snout. The articular bone has a well-developed process at the rear upper side, with a rectangular profile in side view.

Furthermore, a unique combination is present of six traits in themselves not unique. The depression around the bony nostril is weakly developed. The foramen below the nostril is small. The front edge of the nostril is positioned in front of the horizontal midpoint of the premaxilla. The horizontal length of the antorbital fenestra is less than the length of the eye socket. The depression around the antorbital fenestra ends in front of the descending branch of the lacrimal bone. The ectopterygoid the branch connecting to the jugal bone is strongly curved.

== Classification ==
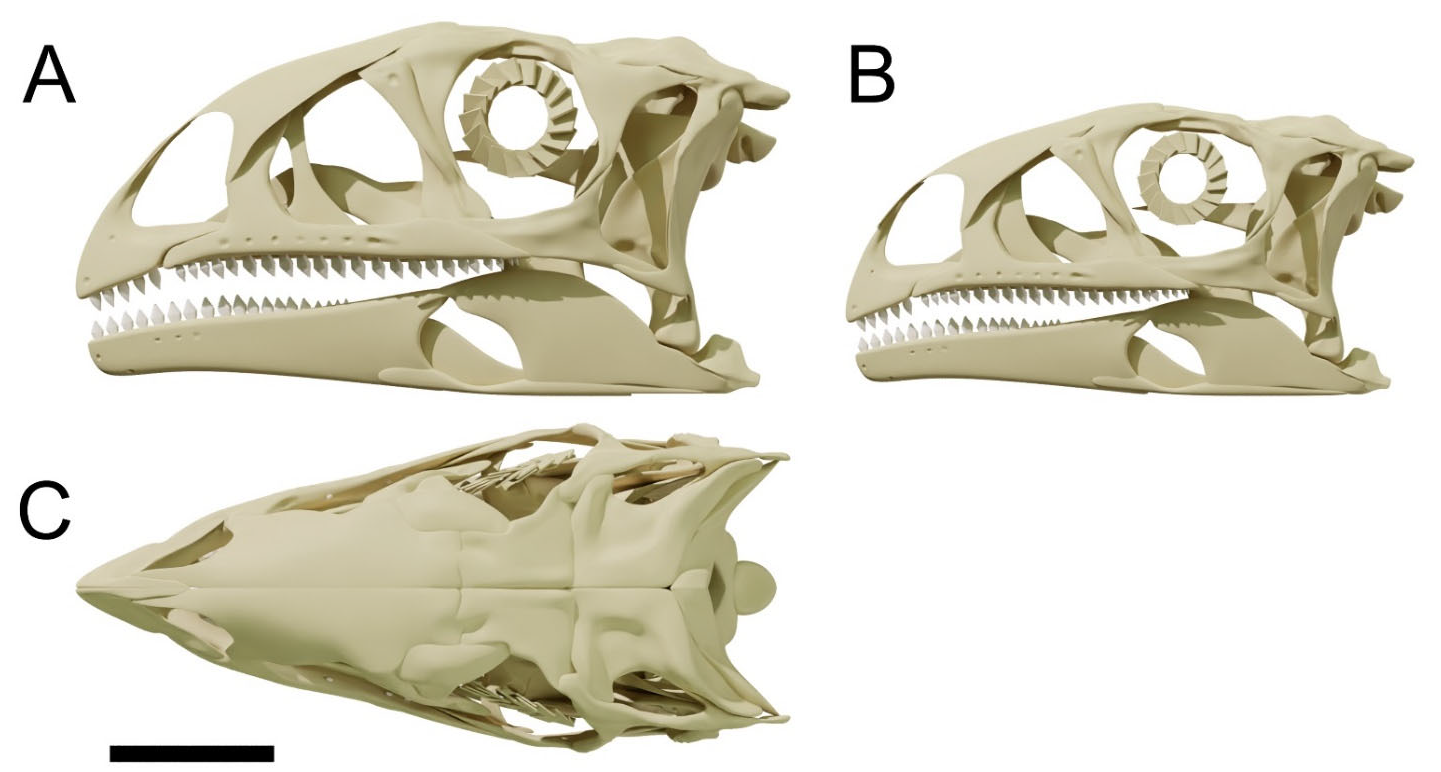
Digitally reconstructed skulls of the holotype (A, C) and paratype (B)

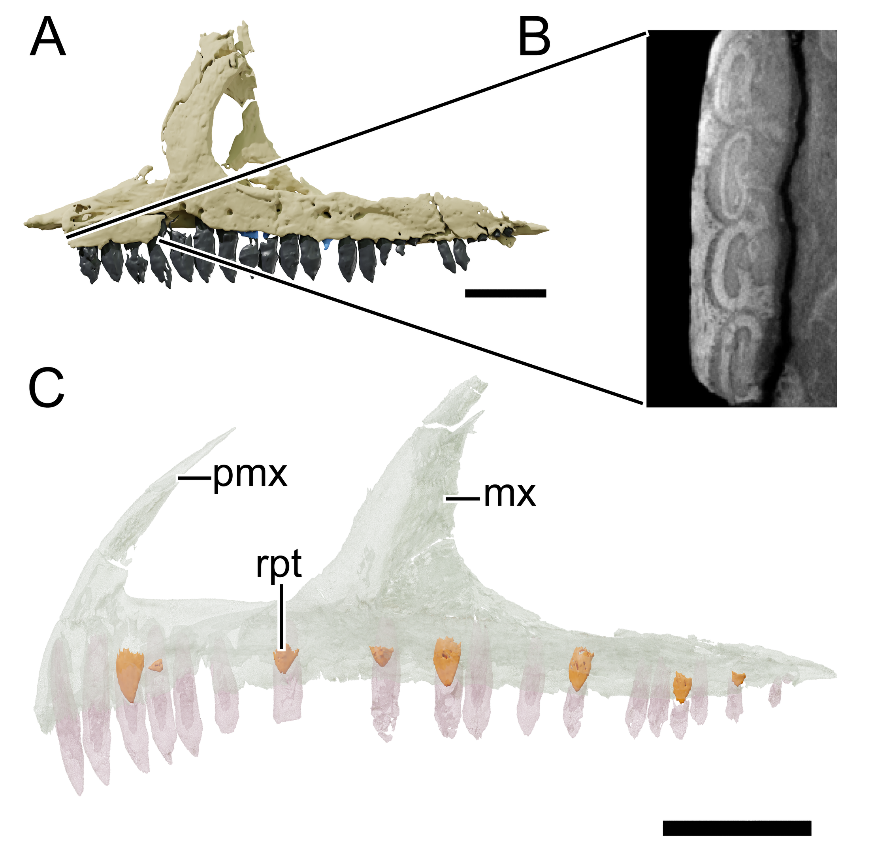
Teeth

The holotype and paratype, NHMD 164741 and NHMD 164758, were initially considered to represent some species of Plateosaurus, likely P. engelhardti or P. trossingensis. However, in 2021 they were reinterpreted as belonging to a distinct genus, the sister species of Plateosaurus. The results of the describers' phylogenetic analyses are shown in the cladogram below:

- - Chromogisaurus
  - Pampadromaeus
  - Panphagia
  - Saturnalia
  - - Guaibasaurus
    - - Pantydraco
      - - Thecodontosaurus
        - - Efraasia
          - - Plateosauravus
            - - Ruehleia
              - - - Plateosauridae
                    - - Macrocollum
                      - Unaysaurus
                    - - Issi
                      - - Plateosaurus gracilis
                        - Plateosaurus trossingensis
                  - - - Riojasaurus
                      - Eucnemesaurus
                    - - Massopoda
