= Grès de l'Infralias =

Geological formation in France

- Stratigraphic range: Rhaetian; ~205–202 Ma
- Type: Geological formation

Lithology
- Primary: Sandstone

Location
- Region: Champagne-Ardennes
- Country: France

Type section
- Named for: "InfraLiassic sandstone"

The Grès de l'Infralias is a geological formation in France. It dates back to the Rhaetian.

== Vertebrate fauna ==
Dinosaurs
Taxa	Presence	Notes	Images
cf. Plateosaurus sp.			
Prosauropoda			
Theropoda indet.		Includes Thecodontosaurus elizae.	

== See also ==
- List of dinosaur-bearing rock formations
