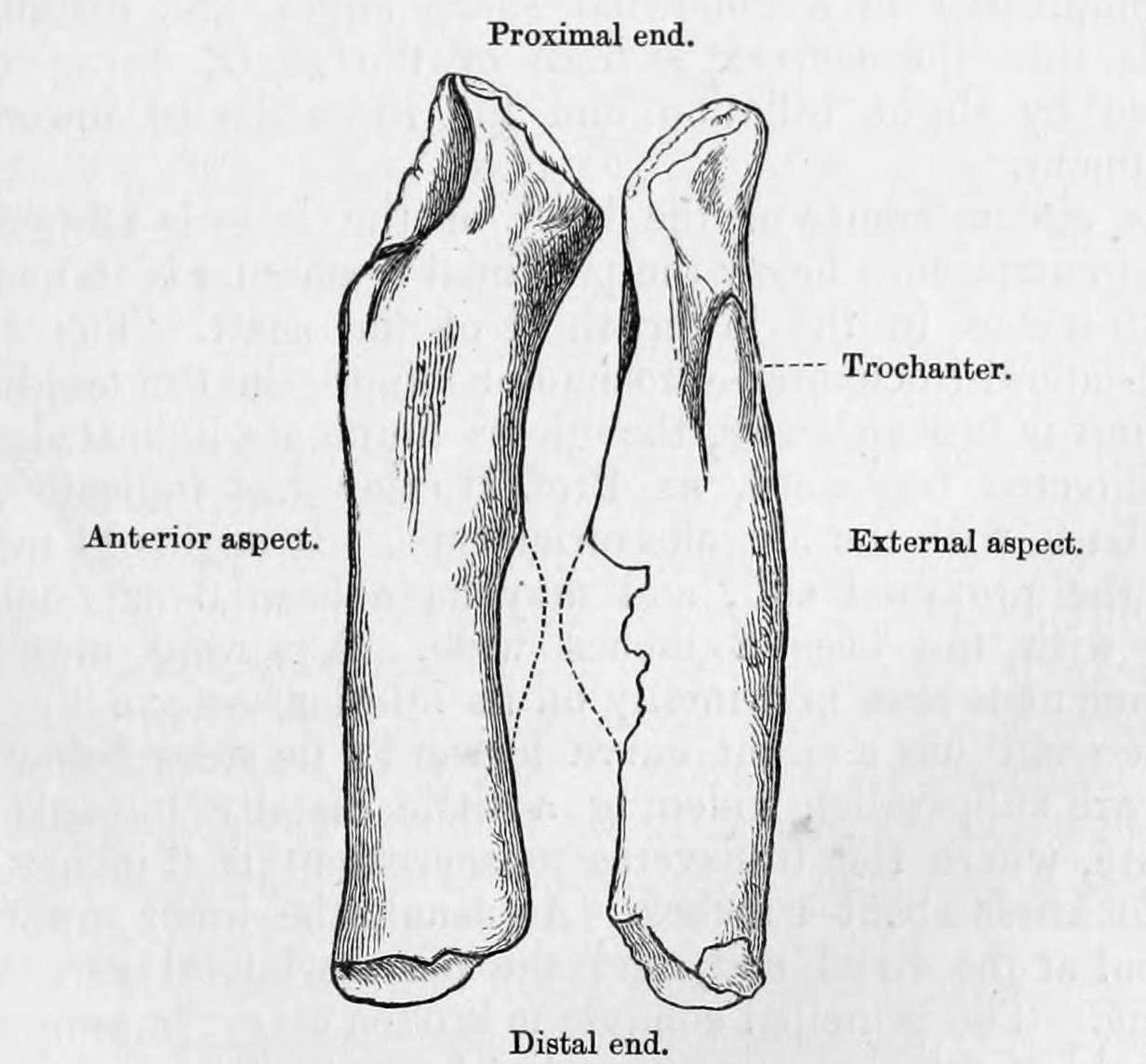
- Femur as depicted in 1894

Scientific classification
- Kingdom: Animalia
- Phylum: Chordata
- Class: Reptilia
- Clade: Dinosauria
- Clade: Saurischia
- Clade: †Sauropodomorpha
- Family: †Plateosauridae
- Genus: †Euskelosaurus
- Species: †E. browni

Binomial name
- †Euskelosaurus browni Huxley, 1866

= Euskelosaurus =

Euskelosaurus Temporal range: Late Triassic, 210–201.3 Ma

Extinct genus of dinosaur from late Triassic southern Africa

Euskelosaurus ("good leg lizard") is a sauropodomorph dinosaur from the Late Triassic of South Africa and Lesotho. Fossils have only been recovered from the lower Elliot Formation in South Africa and Lesotho, and in one locality in Zimbabwe.

== History of discovery ==
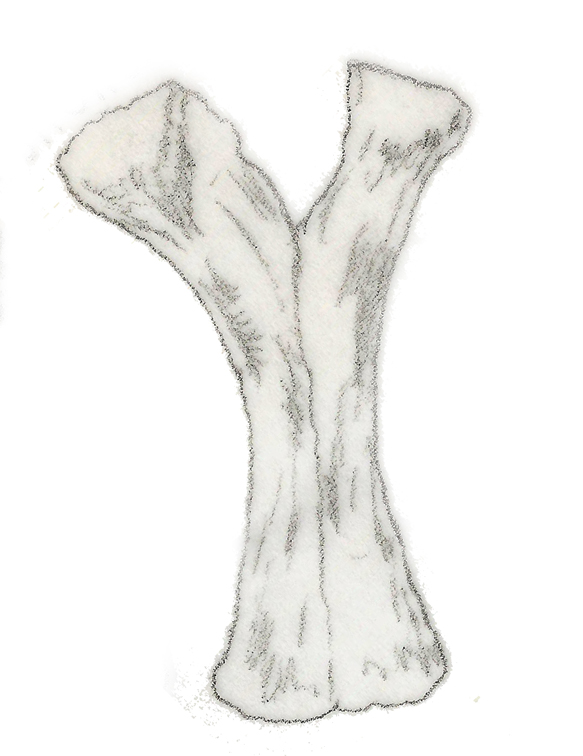
E. browni ischia

In 1863, Alfred Brown recovered fossil material consisting of limb bones and vertebrae, in the lower Elliot Formation in the southeastern Free State. In 1866, Thomas Henry Huxley first described Euskelosaurus from Brown's fossil material, and named the holotype specimen Euskelosaurus browni after Brown. Harry Seeley later described Euskelosaurus in 1894, as did Friedrich von Huene in 1902. Since then, other researchers, including Robert Broom, have mentioned Euskelosaurus in their papers, although later papers refer to the material under the name Plateosauravus.

== Description ==
Euskelosaurus is considered to have been a large, robust member of the sauropodomorph clade. Estimates from the existing fossil material measure this dinosaur at about 12.2 m (40 ft) in length and 7 t (7.7 short tons) in weight. With such parameters it was one of the largest non-sauropod ("prosauropod") sauropodomorphs. Its bones are robust and it had a graviportal limb arrangement, a key character trait of basal sauropodomorphs.

== Classification ==
While paleontologists generally consider Euskelosaurus a basal plateosaurid sauropodomorph, it has recently been considered a nomen dubium and a “waste-basket” taxon with poorly understood phylogenetic relationships, warranting further study.
