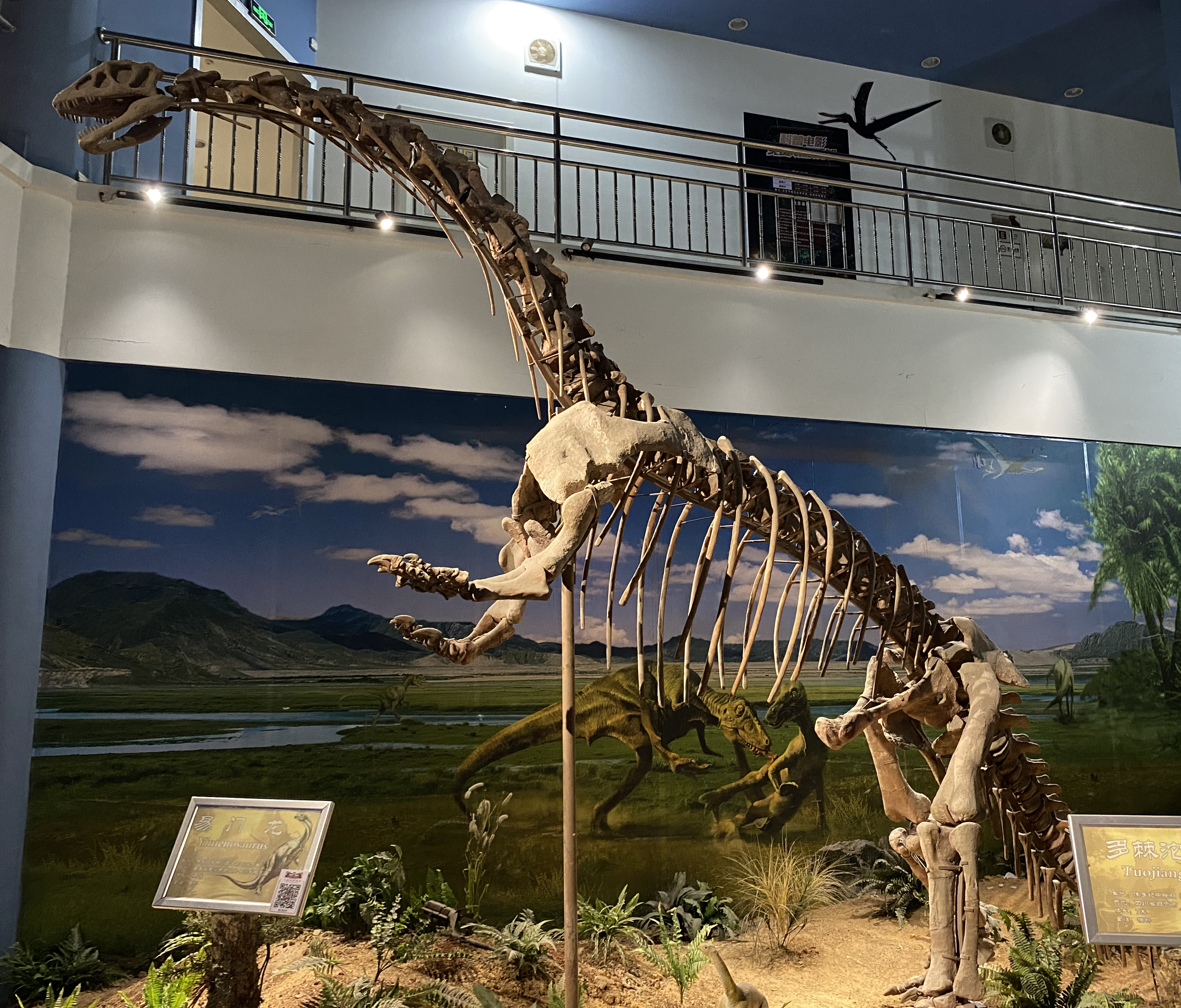
- Reconstructed skeleton in Yuxi Museum

Scientific classification
- Kingdom: Animalia
- Phylum: Chordata
- Class: Reptilia
- Clade: Dinosauria
- Clade: Saurischia
- Clade: †Sauropodomorpha
- Clade: †Plateosauria
- Family: †Plateosauridae
- Genus: †Yimenosaurus; Bai et al., 1990
- Species: †Y. youngi

Binomial name
- †Yimenosaurus youngi Bai et al., 1990

= Yimenosaurus =

Yimenosaurus Temporal range: Early Jurassic, 190 Ma

Extinct genus of dinosaurs

Yimenosaurus (meaning "Yimen reptile") is an extinct genus of plateosaurid sauropodomorph dinosaur that lived in China in the Early Jurassic. The genus was first named in 1990 by Ziqi Bai, Jie Yang and Guohui Wang, along with its type and only species, Yimenosaurus youngi. The species name honours renowned Chinese paleontologist Yang Zhongjian, the father of Chinese paleontology, known as C.C. Young in English. Known material includes the holotype, an almost complete skull and mandible, as well as incomplete cervical and dorsal vertebrae, a mostly complete sacrum, an ilium, ischia, partial ribs and complete femur, and a paratype, a well-preserved postcrania with a fragmentary skull. In 2010 Paul estimated its length at 9 metres (30 ft) and its weight at 2 tonnes (2.2 short tons).

== Discovery and naming ==
Known from two specimens, Yimenosaurus is relatively complete for its type of sauropodomorph. The specimens were described originally in 1990 by Ziqi Bai, Jie Yang and Guohui Wang, and the describers named for them a complete binomial, Yimenosaurus youngi. Bai et al. created the genus name from Yimen County, the place of discovery in Yunnan Province, and the Latin word saurus, meaning "reptile". For the species, it was chosen to honour Yang Zhongjian , the father and founder of all Chinese paleontology, who was well known for his work on "prosauropods", and called in English C.C. Young. Of the two specimens, the holotype was chosen, known from a more complete skull. The holotype, YXV 8701, is known from a complete skull and mandible only lacking the anterior end of the jaw and minor fragments of bone around the orbit, as well as the postcranial elements of fragmentary cervical and dorsal vertebrae, all sacral vertebrae, an ilium, both ischia, a complete femur, and incomplete and damaged ribs. YXV8702, the paratype, is known from an only incomplete skull, many cervical and dorsal vertebrae, three sacrals, a few caudal vertebrae, a scapula-coracoid, an entire pelvis, and almost both entire hindlimbs. All specimens were recovered from the Fengjiahe Formation.
