= Otto Jaekel =

German paleontologist and geologist (1863–1929)

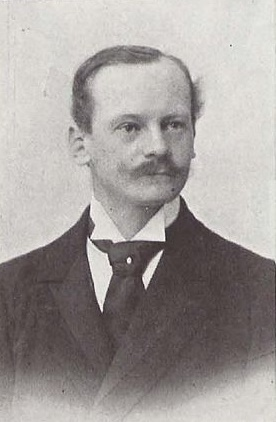
- Otto Jaekel in 1901
- Born: 21 February 1863; Neusalz
- Died: 6 March 1929 (aged 66); Beijing
- Scientific career
- Fields: Paleontology; Paleobiology
- Institutions: Berlin, Greifswald

Otto Max Johannes Jaekel (21 February 1863 – 6 March 1929) was a German paleontologist and geologist.

== Biography ==
Jaekel was born in Neusalz (Nowa Sól), Prussian Silesia, the son of a builder and the youngest of seven children. He studied at the Ritterakademie in Liegnitz (Legnica). After graduating in 1883, he came to study geology and paleontology under Ferdinand Roemer in Breslau (Wrocław) until 1885. Karl von Zittel awarded a PhD to Jaekel in Munich in 1886. Between 1887 and 1889, Jaekel was an assistant of E.W. Benecke at the Geologisch-Paläontologisches Institut in Straßburg, where he received his Habilitation.

He worked at the Friedrich-Wilhelms-Universität Berlin and at the Geologisch-Paläontologisches Museum (a combined post) from 1891. Jaekel was considered as an ordinary professor of geology at the University of Vienna in 1903, but this was blocked by intrigue; however, he was made an extraordinary professor in Berlin a year later. Between 1906 and 1928, Jaekel was a professor at the University of Greifswald, where he founded the German Paleontological Society in 1912.

After his retirement in Greifswald, Otto Jaekel accepted a position at Sun Yat-sen University in Guangzhou in 1928. He died after a short and unexpected illness in the German Hospital in Beijing.

== Work ==
As a paleontologist, Jaekel specialized in the study of fossil vertebrates, particularly fishes and reptiles. However, 27 of his publications were about echinodermata. In addition, he wrote about politics, law, literature, and art. He was an accomplished painter and used his skills to produce landscape paintings that illustrate the geology of the Pomeranian coast. Furthermore, his collection of Japanese Ukiyo-e wood block prints was among the most important in Germany and featured in several exhibitions and catalogs.

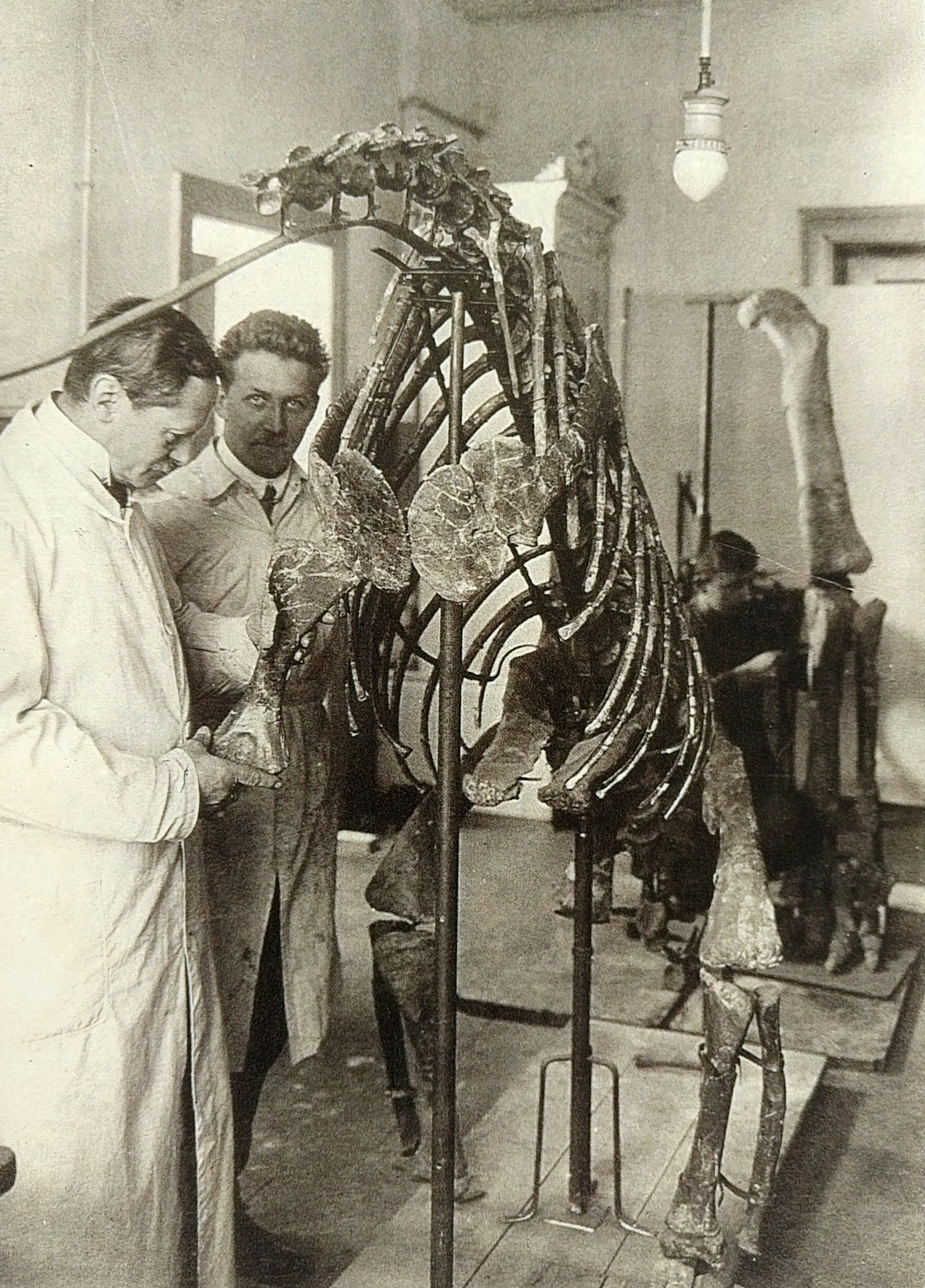
Jaekel and Eto von Zschock working on a Plateosaurus, 1912.

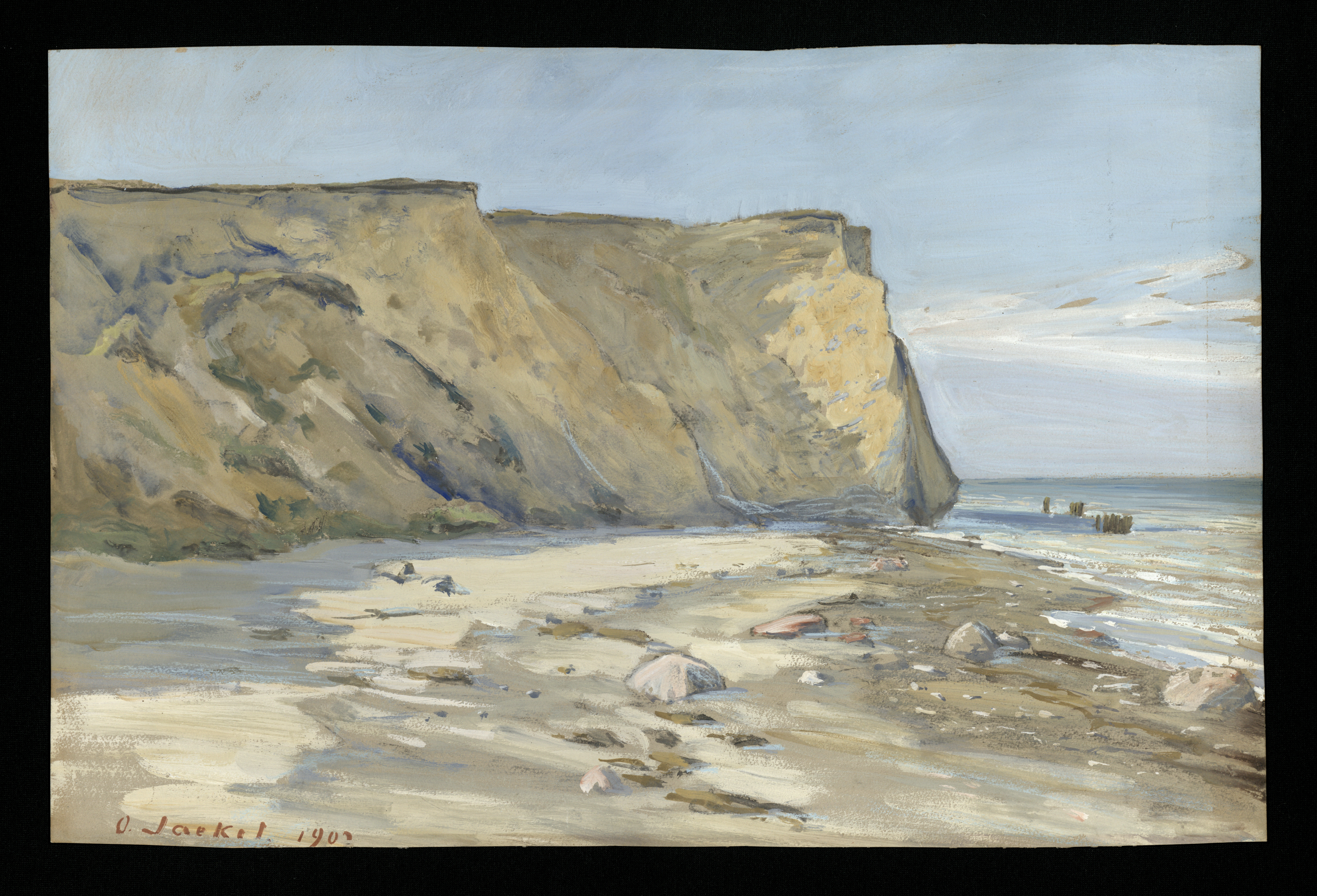
Otto Jaekel, Cliff coast with beach, 1907.

Apart from his publications, Jaekel's most prominent contribution to vertebrate paleontology lies in the excavations in Wildungen (1890-1903) and Halberstadt (1909-1912), both of which he supervised. In Wildungen, various forms of Devonian fishes were excavated, while Halberstadt yielded a large number (more than thirty) of the dinosaur Plateosaurus. He described a second species of Plateosaurus in 1914.

During World War I, in which he served as a Hauptmann (Captain) in the 210th Prussian Infantry Regiment, Jaekel attempted to re-start excavations at the southern Belgian town of Bernissart, where several dozen specimens of the dinosaur Iguanodon had been dug up in the 1870s. Although he eventually succeeded in persuading the German occupation authorities to support his initiative, the attempt had to be abandoned after the German army withdrew from the area in November 1918, following its surrender.

== Publications ==
- Jaekel, Otto. 1896. “Über die Stammform der Wirbelthiere.” Sitzungsberichte der Gesellschaft Naturforschender Freunde zu Berlin 7 107–29.
- Jaekel, Otto. 1899. Stammesgeschichte der Pelmatozoen: Thecoidea und Cystoidea. Berlin: Julius Springer.
- Jaekel, Otto. 1902. “Ueber verschiedene Wege phylogenetischer Entwickelung.” In Verhandlungen Des V. Internationalen Zoologen-Congresses Zu Berlin, 12. - 16. August 1901, 1058–117. Jena: Gustav Fischer.
- Jaekel, Otto. 1903. “Besprechung des ersten Berichts des Geologischen Beratungs-Komitees für das Carnegie-Institut in Washington.” Zeitschrift der Deutschen Geologischen Gesellschaft 73–76.
- Jaekel, Otto. 1904. “Eine neue Darstellung von Ichthyosaurus.” Zeitschrift der deutschen geologischen Gesellschaft 26–34.
- Jaekel, Otto. 1904. “K.A. V. Zittel, Der Altmeister der Paläontologie.” Naturwissenschaftliche Wochenschrift 1–7.
- Jaekel, Otto. 1905. “Die Bedeutung der Wirbelstacheln der Naosauriden.” Zeitschrift der Deutschen Geologischen Gesellschaft 57 192–95.
- Jaekel, Otto. 1910. “Naosaurus Credneri im Rotliegenden von Sachsen.” Zeitschrift der Deutschen Geologischen Gesellschaft 62 526–35.
- Jaekel, Otto. 1910. “Rekonstruktionen Fossiler Tiere.” In Meyer’s Großes Konversations-Lexikon, 6. Auflage. XXII. Band, Jahressupl. 1909-1910, 712–715, 4 plates. Leipzig & Wien: Bibliographisches Institut.
- Jaekel, Otto. 1910. “Über die Füßstellung und Lebensweise der großen Dinosaurier.” Zeitschrift der Deutschen Geologischen Gesellschaft 62 270–76.
- Jaekel, Otto. 1911. Die Wirbeltiere; Eine Übersicht über die fossilen und lebenden Formen. Berlin: Gebrüder Borntraeger.
- Jaekel, Otto. 1914. “Über die Wirbeltierfunde in der Oberen Trias von Halberstadt.” Paläontologische Zeitschrift 1 (1): 155–215.
- Jaekel, Otto. 1916. Die natürlichen Grundlagen staatlicher Organisation. Berlin: Stilke.
- Jaekel, Otto. 1916. “Die Wirbeltierfunde aus dem Keuper von Halberstadt.” Paläontologische Zeitschrift 2 (3): 88–214.
- Jaekel, Otto. 1921. “Phylogenie und System der Pelmatozoen.” Paläontologische Zeitschrift 3 (1): 1–128.
- Jaekel, Otto. 1922. “Funktion und Form in der organischen Entwicklung.” Paläontologische Zeitschrift 4: 147–66.
- Jaekel, Otto. 1923. “Zur morphogenie der Asterozoa.” Paläontologische Zeitschrift
- Jaekel, Otto. 1928. Zur Urgeschichte des Menschen. Abschiedsvorlesung am 21. Februar 1928. Greifswald: Ratshandlung L. Bamberg.
- Jaekel, Otto. 1929. Die Morphogenie der ältesten Wirbeltiere. Berlin: G. Borntraeger, 1929

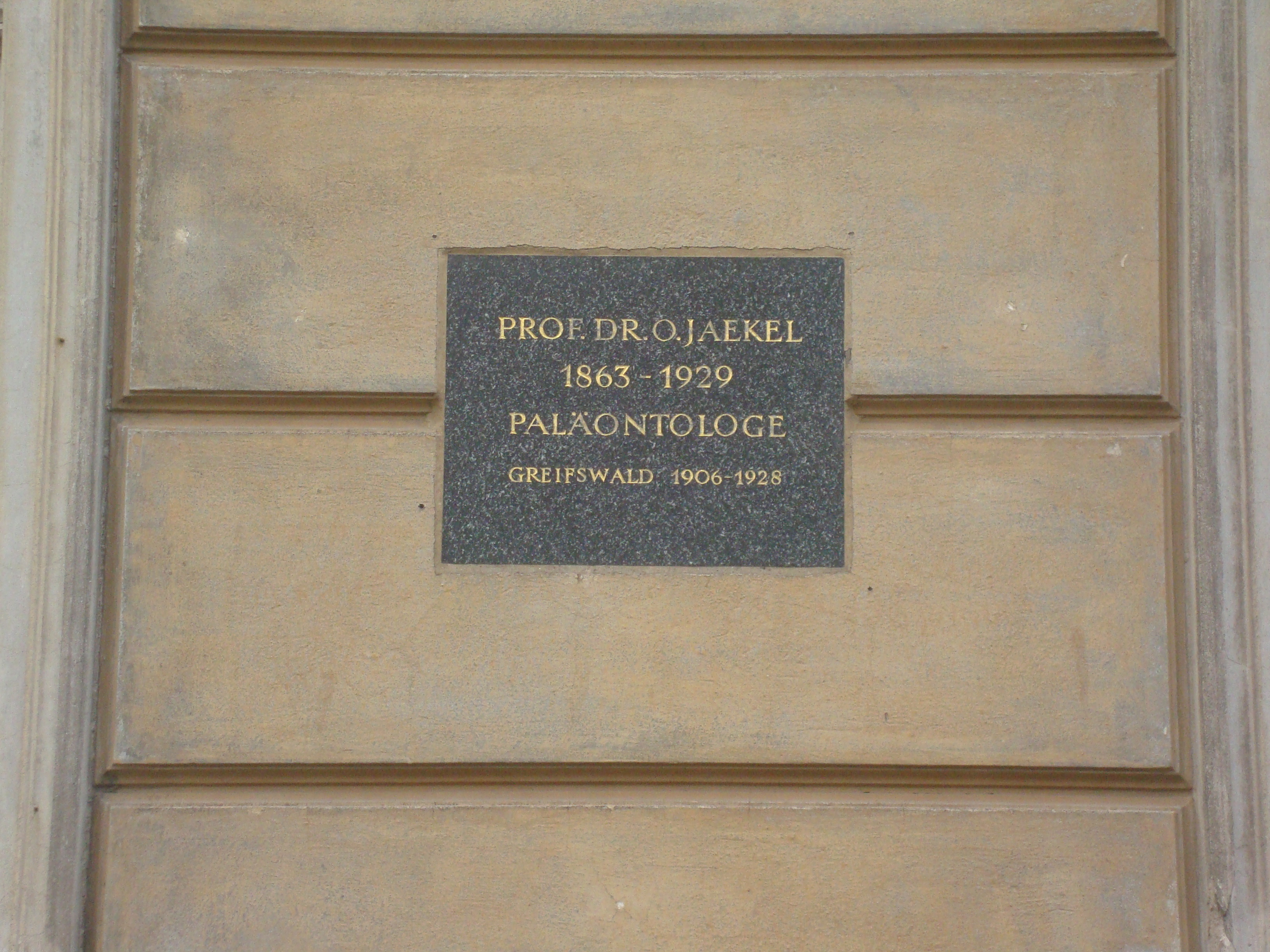
Commemorative plaque dedicated to Jaekel in Greifswald
