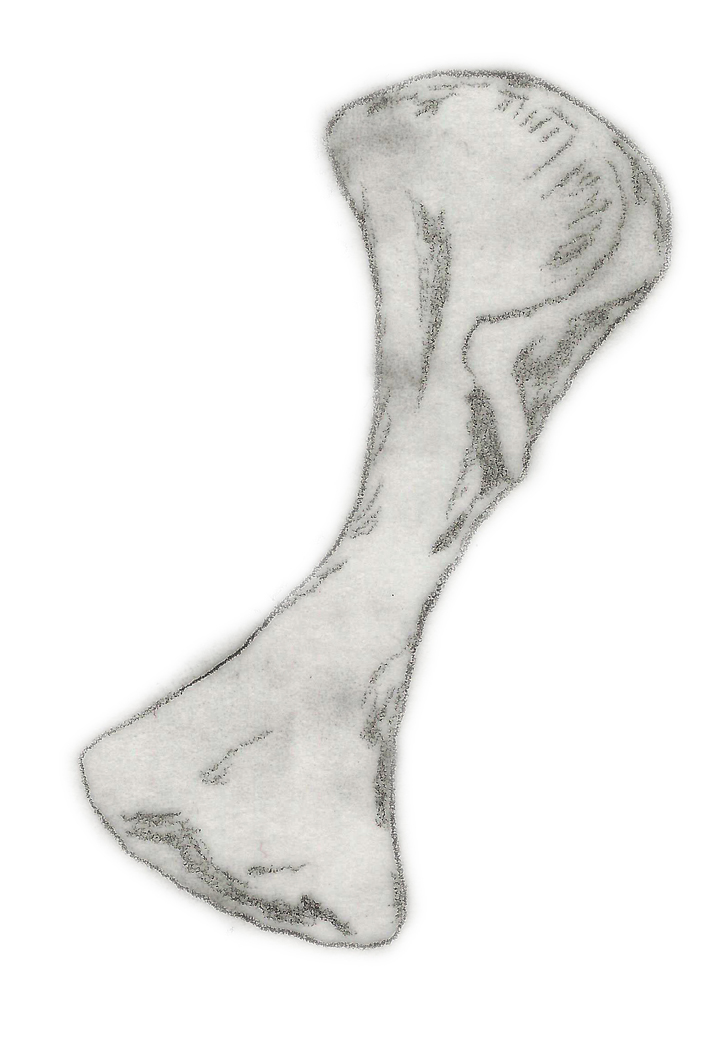
- Humerus

Scientific classification
- Domain: Eukaryota
- Kingdom: Animalia
- Phylum: Chordata
- Clade: Dinosauria
- Clade: Saurischia
- Clade: †Sauropodomorpha
- Clade: †Plateosauria
- Genus: †Plateosauravus von Huene 1932
- Species: †P. cullingworthi

Binomial name
- †Plateosauravus cullingworthi (Sidney Haughton 1924 [originally Plateosaurus])

= Plateosauravus =

Plateosauravus Temporal range: Norian ~221–202 Ma

Extinct genus of reptiles from the South African Triassic

Plateosauravus ("grandfather of Plateosaurus") is a basal plateosaurian of uncertain affinities from the Late Triassic Elliot Formation of South Africa.

Sidney Haughton named Plateosaurus cullingworthi in 1924 from a partial skeleton, type specimen SAM 3341, 3345, 3347, 3350–51, 3603, 3607. The specific name honoured collector T.L. Cullingworth. Friedrich von Huene reassessed it in 1932 as belonging to a new genus, which he named Plateosauravus. Jacques van Heerden reassigned it to Euskelosaurus in 1979, and this has been how it was usually considered. However, recent study indicates that Euskelosaurus is based on undiagnostic material and thus a nomen dubium; in his series of sauropodomorph and basal sauropod papers, Adam Yates has recommended no longer using Euskelosaurus and has suggested the use of Plateosauravus instead.

More than a dozen additional partial skeletons have been found in the Kruger National Park after a discovery by game warden Adriaan Louw on 27 March 1995. These include juvenile individuals.
