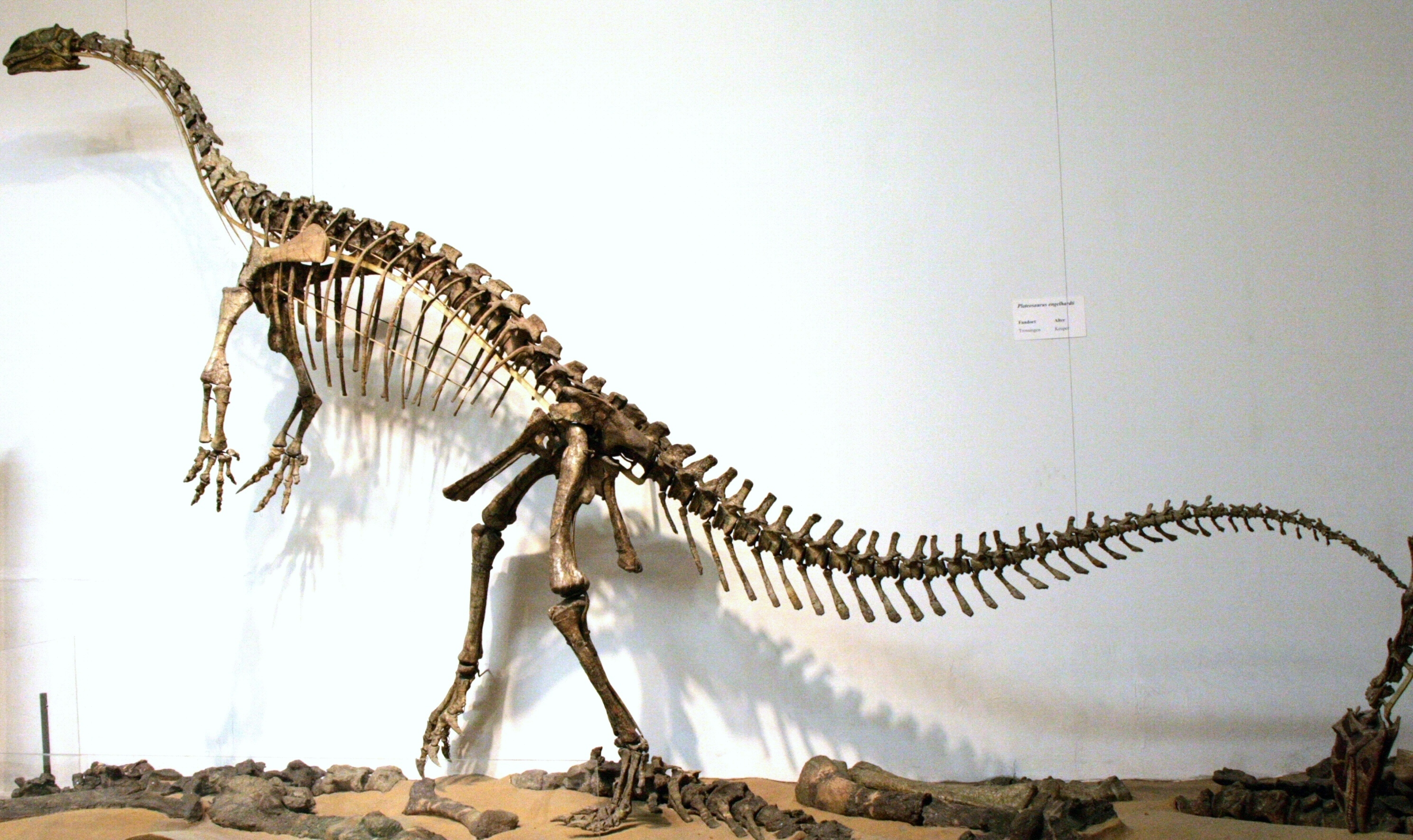
- Mounted skeleton of P. trossingensis (GPIT "Skelett 2"), consisting of two individual specimens from the Trossingen Formation, museum of the Institute for Geosciences (GPIT) of the Eberhard-Karls-University Tübingen, Germany

Scientific classification
- Kingdom: Animalia
- Phylum: Chordata
- Class: Reptilia
- Clade: Dinosauria
- Clade: Saurischia
- Clade: †Sauropodomorpha
- Family: †Plateosauridae
- Genus: †Plateosaurus von Meyer, 1837

Type species
- †Plateosaurus trossingensis Fraas, 1913

Other species
- †P. gracilis (von Huene, 1907–08 [originally Sellosaurus]); †P. longiceps Jaekel, 1913-14; †P. engelhardti von Meyer, 1837 (nomen dubium)

Synonyms
- Dimodosaurus Pidancet & Chopard, 1862; Sellosaurus von Huene, 1907–1908

= Plateosaurus =

Plateosaurus Temporal range: Late Triassic (Norian), 227–204 Ma

Sauropodomorph dinosaur

Plateosaurus (probably meaning "broad lizard", often mistranslated as "flat lizard") is a genus of plateosaurid dinosaur that lived during the Late Triassic epoch of the Triassic period, around 214 to 204 million years ago, in what is now Central and Northern Europe. Plateosaurus is a basal (early) sauropodomorph dinosaur, a so-called "prosauropod". The type species is Plateosaurus trossingensis; before 2019, that honor was given to Plateosaurus engelhardti, but it was ruled as undiagnostic (i.e. indistinguishable from other dinosaurs) by the ICZN. Currently, there are three valid species; in addition to P. trossingensis, P. longiceps and P. gracilis are also known. However, others have been assigned in the past, and there is no broad consensus on the species taxonomy of plateosaurid dinosaurs. Similarly, there are a plethora of synonyms (invalid duplicate names) at the genus level.

Discovered in 1834 by Johann Friedrich Engelhardt and described three years later by Hermann von Meyer, Plateosaurus was the fifth named dinosaur genus that is still considered valid. Although it had been described before Richard Owen formally named Dinosauria in 1842, it was not one of the three genera used by Owen to define the group, because at the time, it was poorly known and difficult to identify as a dinosaur. It is now among the dinosaurs best known to science: over 100 skeletons have been found, some of them nearly complete. The abundance of its fossils in Swabia, Germany, has led to the nickname Schwäbischer Lindwurm (Swabian lindworm).

Plateosaurus was a bipedal herbivore with a small skull on a long, flexible neck, sharp but plump plant-crushing teeth, powerful hind limbs, short but muscular arms and grasping hands with large claws on three fingers, possibly used for defence and feeding. Unusually for a dinosaur, Plateosaurus showed strong developmental plasticity: instead of having a fairly uniform adult size, fully grown individuals were between 4.8 and 10 metres (16 and 33 ft) long and weighed between 600 and 4,000 kilograms (1,300 and 8,800 lb). Commonly, the animals lived for at least 12 to 20 years, but the maximum life span is not known.

Despite the great quantity and excellent quality of the fossil material, Plateosaurus was for a long time one of the most misunderstood dinosaurs. Some researchers proposed theories that were later shown to conflict with geological and palaeontological evidence, but have become the paradigm of public opinion. Since 1980 the taxonomy (relationships), taphonomy (how the animals became embedded and fossilised), biomechanics (how their skeletons worked), and palaeobiology (life circumstances) of Plateosaurus have been re-studied in detail, altering the interpretation of the animal's biology, posture and behaviour.

== Discovery and history ==
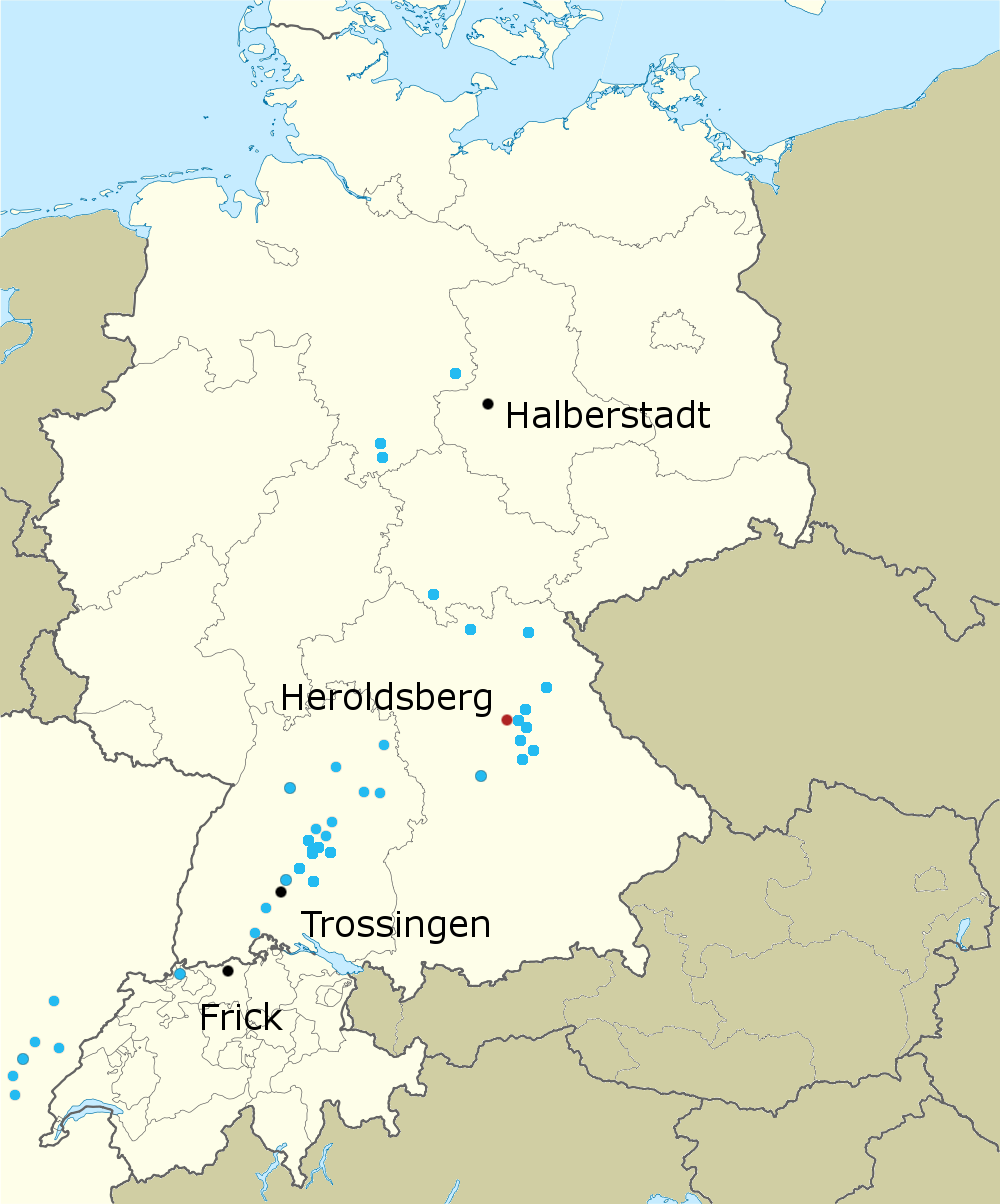
Map of important Plateosaurus localities. Red = likely type locality Heroldsberg, black = important sites with many and well-preserved specimens. Other localities in blue. (Note: based on fig. 3 (p. 8) in Moser (2003))

In 1834, physician Johann Friedrich Engelhardt discovered some vertebrae and leg bones at Heroldsberg near Nuremberg, Germany. Three years later German palaeontologist Hermann von Meyer designated them as the type specimen of a new genus, Plateosaurus. Since then, remains of well over 100 individuals of Plateosaurus have been discovered at various locations throughout Europe.

Material assigned to Plateosaurus has been found at over 50 localities in Germany (mainly along the Neckar and Pegnitz river valleys), Switzerland (Frick) and France. Three localities are of special importance, because they yielded specimens in large numbers and of unusually good quality: near Halberstadt in Saxony-Anhalt, Germany; Trossingen in Baden-Württemberg, Germany; and Frick. Between the 1910s and 1930s, excavations in a clay pit in Saxony-Anhalt revealed between 39 and 50 skeletons that belonged to Plateosaurus, along with teeth and a small number of bones of the theropod Liliensternus, and two skeletons and some fragments of the turtle Proganochelys. Some of the plateosaur material was assigned to P. longiceps, a species described by palaeontologist Otto Jaekel in 1914. Most of the material found its way to the Museum für Naturkunde in Berlin, where much of it was destroyed during World War II. The Halberstadt quarry today is covered by a housing development.

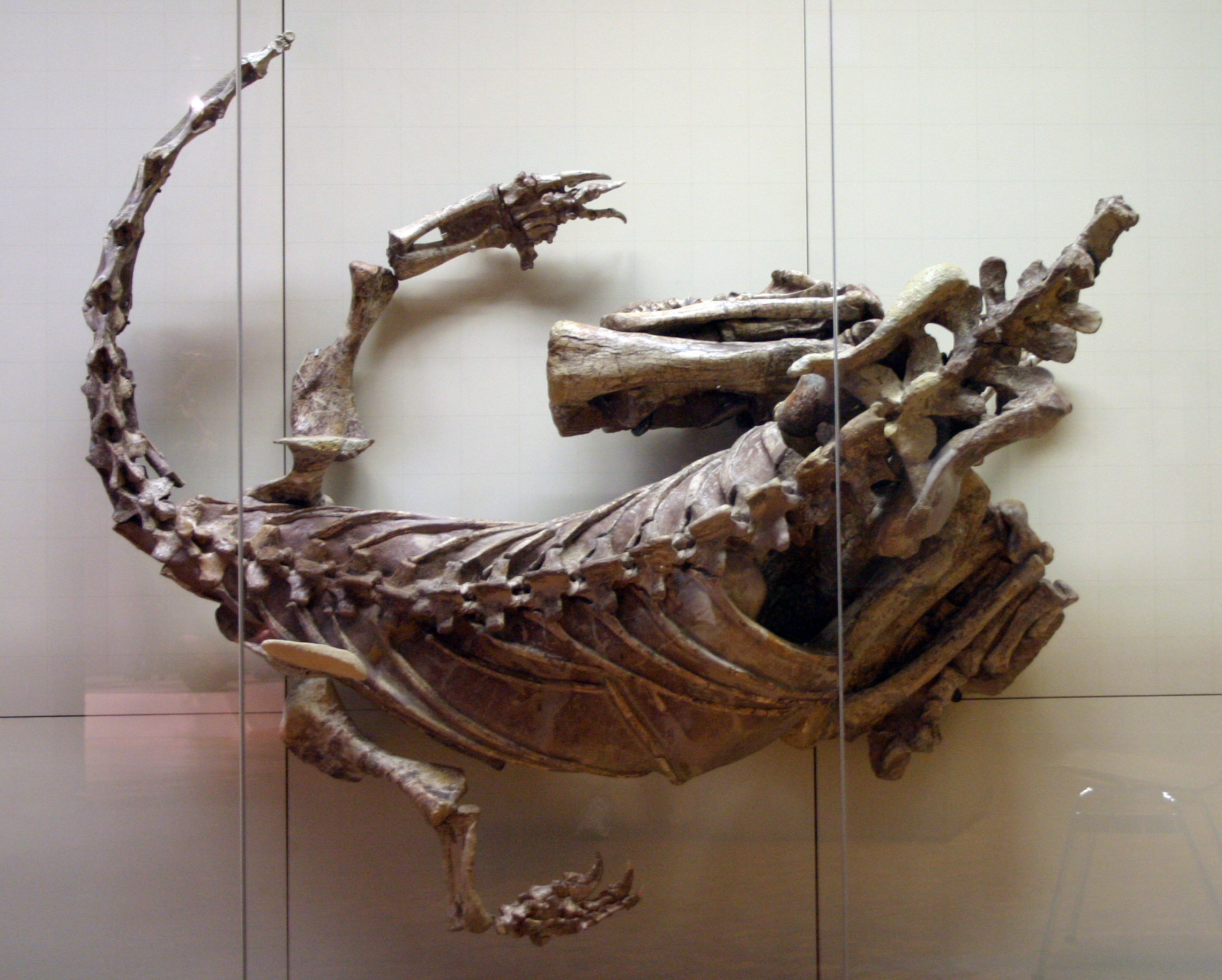
P. trossingensis, collection number F 33 of the Staatliches Museum für Naturkunde Stuttgart, Germany, in dorsal view. The skeleton was kept in articulation as found at Trossingen by Seemann in 1933. It has the typical folded hind limbs of most Plateosaurus finds. Unusually, the anterior body is not twisted to one side.

The second major German locality with Plateosaurus finds, a quarry in Trossingen in the Black Forest, was worked repeatedly in the 20th century. Between 1911 and 1932, excavations during six field seasons led by German palaeontologists Eberhard Fraas (1911–1912), Friedrich von Huene (1921–23), and finally Reinhold Seemann (1932) revealed a total of 35 complete or partially complete skeletons of Plateosaurus, as well as fragmentary remains of approximately 70 more individuals. The large number of specimens from Swabia had already caused German palaeontologist Friedrich August von Quenstedt to nickname the animal Schwäbischer Lindwurm (Swabian lindworm or Swabian dragon). (Note: Quenstedt (1858), cited on p. 255 in Sander (1992)) Much of the Trossingen material was destroyed in 1944, when the Naturaliensammlung in Stuttgart (predecessor to the State Museum of Natural History Stuttgart (SMNS)) burnt to the ground after an Allied bombing raid. Luckily, however, a 2011 study by SMNS curator Rainer Schoch found that, at least from the finds of Seemann's 1932 excavation, "the scientifically most valuable material is still available". (Note: p. 271 in Schoch (2011))

The Plateosaurus skeletons in a clay pit of the Tonwerke Keller AG in Frick, Switzerland, were first noticed in 1976. While the bones are often significantly deformed by taphonomic processes, Frick yields skeletons of P. trossingensis comparable in completeness and position to those of Trossingen.

In 1997, workers of an oil platform of the Snorre oil field, located at the northern end of the North Sea within the Lunde Formation, were drilling through sandstone for oil exploration when they stumbled on a fossil they believed to be plant material. The drill core containing the fossil was extracted from 2,256 m (7,402 ft) below the seafloor. Martin Sander and Nicole Klein, palaeontologists of the University of Bonn, analysed the bone microstructure and concluded that the rock preserved fibrous bone tissue from a fragment of a limb bone belonging to Plateosaurus, making it the first dinosaur found in Norway. Material referred to Plateosaurus has also been found in the Fleming Fjord Formation of East Greenland, but they were given the new genus name Issi in 2021.

The type series of Plateosaurus engelhardti included "roughly 45 bone fragments", (Note: p. 74 in Blankenhorn (1898)) of which nearly half are lost. (Note: p. 12 in Moser (2003) (English summary on p. 170)) The remaining material is kept in the Institute for Palaeontology of the University of Erlangen-Nuremberg, Germany. (Note: p. 13 in Moser (2003) (English summary on p. 161)) From these bones, German palaeontologist Markus Moser in 2003 selected a partial sacrum (series of fused hip vertebrae) as a lectotype. (Note: p. 13 in Moser (2003), see also pp. 17 and pp. 36–40, English summary on pp. 160–161 and 163–164) The type locality is not known for certain, but Moser attempted to infer it from previous publications and the colour and preservation of the bones. He concluded that the material probably stems from the "Buchenbühl", roughly two kilometres (1.2 mi) south of Heroldsberg. (Note: pp. 14–15 in Moser (2003) (English summary on p. 160))

The type specimen of Plateosaurus gracilis, an incomplete postcranium, is kept at the Staatliches Museum für Naturkunde Stuttgart, Germany, and the type locality is Heslach, a suburb of the same city. (Note: pp. 331–332 in Yates (2003))

The type specimen of Plateosaurus trossingensis is SMNS 132000, stored in the same museum as P. gracilis. Its type locality is Trossingen, within the Trossingen Formation.

The type specimen of Plateosaurus longiceps is MB.R.1937, which is stored in the Museum für Naturkunde in Berlin. Its type locality is Halberstadt, located in Saxony-Anhalt and the Trossingen Formation.

=== Etymology ===
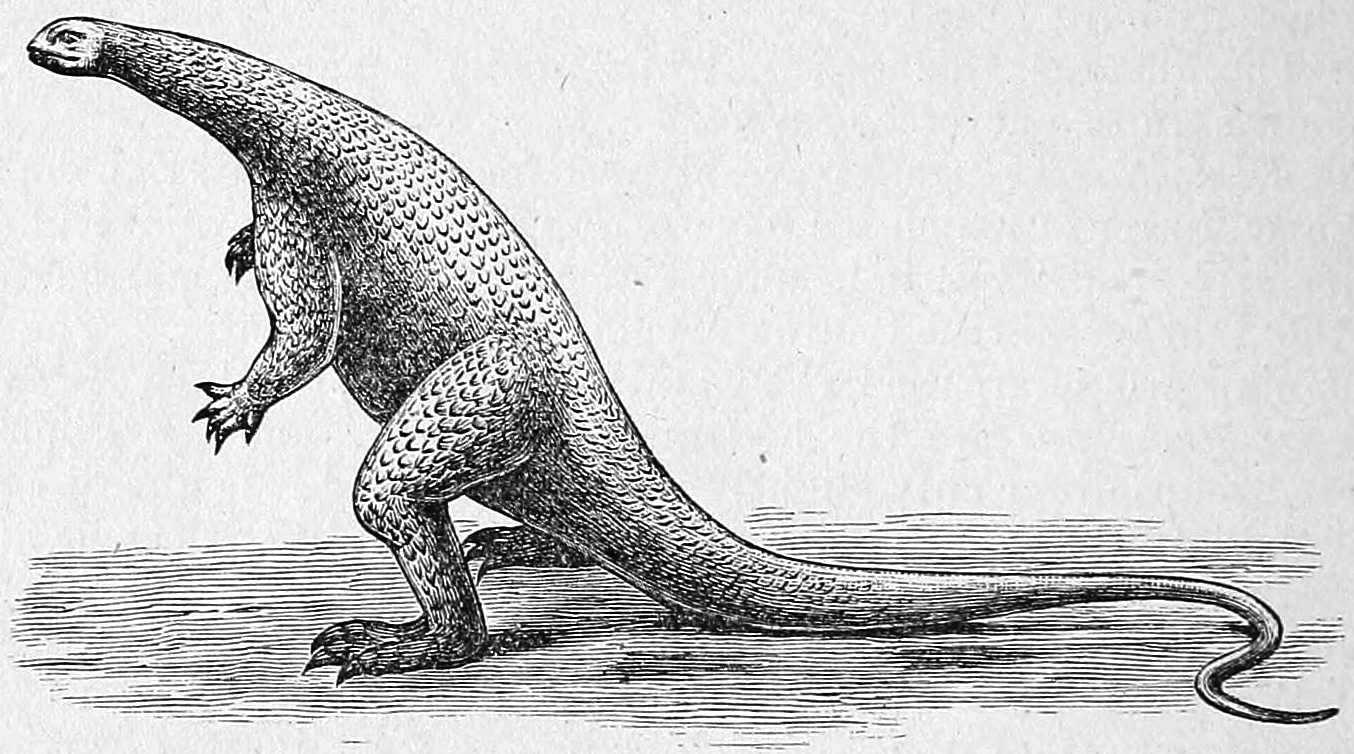
Outdated 1912 life restoration by Otto Jaekel showing tripodal pose

The etymology of the name Plateosaurus is not entirely clear, as the original description contains no information and various authors have offered differing interpretations. (Note: p. 13 in Moser (2003)) German geologist Hanns Bruno Geinitz in 1846 gave "(πλᾰτῠ́ς, breit)" [English: broad] (Note: p. 89 in Geinitz (1846)) as the origin of the name, with von Meyer's Latin spelling Plateosaurus evidently derived from the stem of πλᾰτέος (plateos), the genitive case of the masculine adjective platys in Ancient Greek. In the same year, Agassiz proposed that the name derives from the Ancient Greek πλατη (platê – "paddle", "rudder"; Agassiz translates this as Latin pala = "spade") and σαυρος (sauros – "lizard"). (Note: p. 34 in Agassiz (1844), cited on p. 13 in Moser (2003)) Agassiz consequently renamed the genus Platysaurus, (Note: p. 296 in Agassiz (1846), cited on p. 13 in Moser (2003)) probably from Greek πλατυς (platys – "broad, flat, broad-shouldered"), creating an invalid junior synonym. Later authors often referred to this derivation, and the secondary meaning "flat" of πλατυς, so that Plateosaurus is often translated as "flat lizard". Often, claims were made that πλατυς is supposed to have been intended as a reference to flat bones, for example the laterally flattened teeth of Plateosaurus, (Note: p. 57 in Vollrath (1959)) but the teeth and other flat bones such as the pubic bones and some skull elements were unknown at the time of description. (Note: p. 13 in Moser (2003))

Von Meyer's original short description from 1837 did not provide an etymology for Plateosaurus, but noted (as translated into English by British biologist Thomas Henry Huxley in 1870): "The bones belong to a gigantic Saurian, which, in virtue of the mass and hollowness of its limb-bones, is allied to Iguanodon and to Megalosaurus, and will belong to the second division of my Saurian system." Von Meyer later gave the formal name Pachypodes or Pachypoda ("thick feet") to his second division of "Saurians with Limbs Similar to Heavy Land Mammalia", but the group was a synonym of Richard Owen's Dinosauria from 1842.

In 1855, von Meyer published a detailed description of Plateosaurus with illustrations, but again gave no details on the etymology. He repeatedly referred to its gigantic size ("Riesensaurus" = giant lizard) and massive limbs ("schwerfüssig"), comparing Plateosaurus to large modern land mammals, but did not describe any important features that fit the terms "flat" or "shaped like an oar." (Note: pp. 152-155 in von Meyer (1855)) Researcher Ben Creisler therefore concluded that "broad lizard" is the most suitable translation, and possibly was intended to emphasise the giant size of the animal, in particular its robust limb bones.

Von Meyer had authored a popular audience book in 1852 Ueber Die Reptilien und Säugethiere Der Verschiedenen Zeiten Der Erde [On the Reptiles and Mammals from the Different Time Periods of the Earth] based to two public lectures. In the book on page 44, he briefly described Plateosaurus, using the term "breit" [broad] for different features, including "broad, strong limb bones," noting that it had: "das in mehreren verwachsenen Wirbeln bestehende Heiligenbein, breite, starke Gliedmaassenknochen von 1 1/2 Fuss Länge mit einer geräumigen Markhöhle, zierliche Krystalle von Nadeleisenerz einschliessend, so wie Zehenglieder, welche ebenfalls breit und hohl waren...; es wäre diess der älteste bis jetzt aufgefundene Pachypode." [a sacrum composed of several fused vertebrae, broad, strong limb bones 1 1/2 feet long with an ample medullary cavity enclosing finely formed crystals of Goethite iron ore, as well as toe phalanges, which were also broad and hollow...; it would be the oldest pachypode [dinosaur] yet found.]

=== Valid species ===
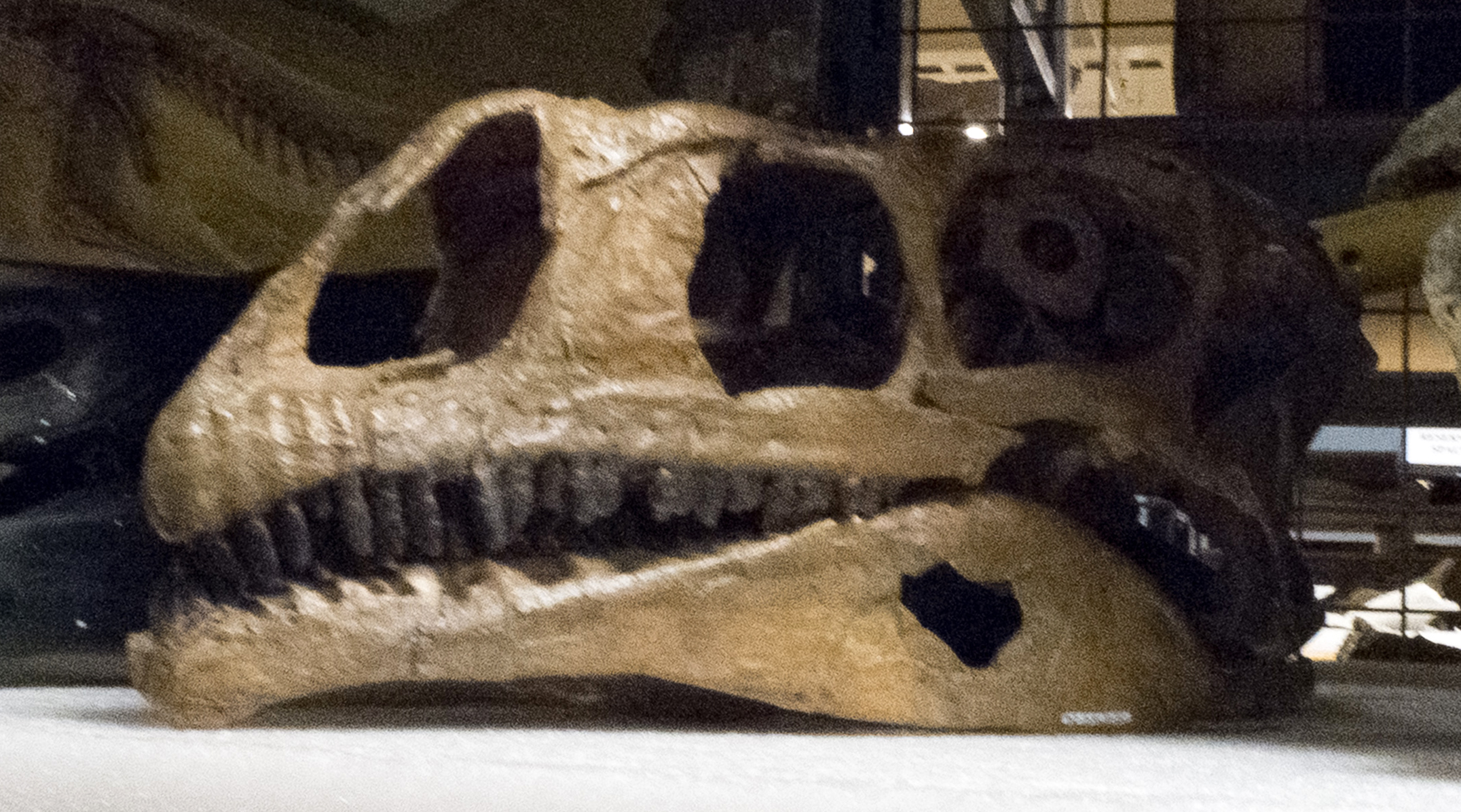
Skull cast of P. gracilis

The taxonomic history of Plateosaurus is "long and confusing" and a "chaotic tangle of names". (Note: p. 317 in Yates (2003)) As of 2019, only three species are universally accepted as valid: the type species P. trossingensis, P. longiceps, and P. gracilis (which was previously assigned to its own genus, Sellosaurus). Moser performed the most extensive and detailed investigation of all plateosaurid material from Germany and Switzerland, concluding that all Plateosaurus and most other prosauropod material from the Keuper stems from the same species as the type material of Plateosaurus engelhardti. However, this is problematic due to the undiagnostic state of the lectotype. Moser considered Sellosaurus to be the same genus as Plateosaurus, but did not discuss whether S. gracilis and P. engelhardti belong to the same species. (Note: p. 152 in Moser (2003) (English summary on p. 179)) Palaeontologist Adam Yates of the University of the Witwatersrand cast further doubt on the generic separation. He included the type material of Sellosaurus gracilis in Plateosaurus as P. gracilis and reintroduced the old name Efraasia for some material that had been assigned to Sellosaurus. In 1926, von Huene had already concluded the two genera were the same. (Note: p. 5 in Huene (1926))

Yates has cautioned that P. gracilis may be a metataxon, which means that there is neither evidence that the material assigned to it is monophyletic (belongs to one species), nor that it is paraphyletic (belongs to several species). (Note: p. 331 in Yates (2003)) This is the case because the holotype of P. (Sellosaurus) gracilis has no skull, and the other specimens consist of skulls and material that overlaps too little with the holotype to make it certain that it belongs to the same taxon. It is therefore possible that the known material contains more species belonging to Plateosaurus. (Note: p. 328 in Yates (2003))

Some scientists regard other species as valid as well, for example P. erlenbergensis and P. engelhardti. These claims are problematic since both P. erlenbergensis and P. engelhardti have undiagnostic type specimens.

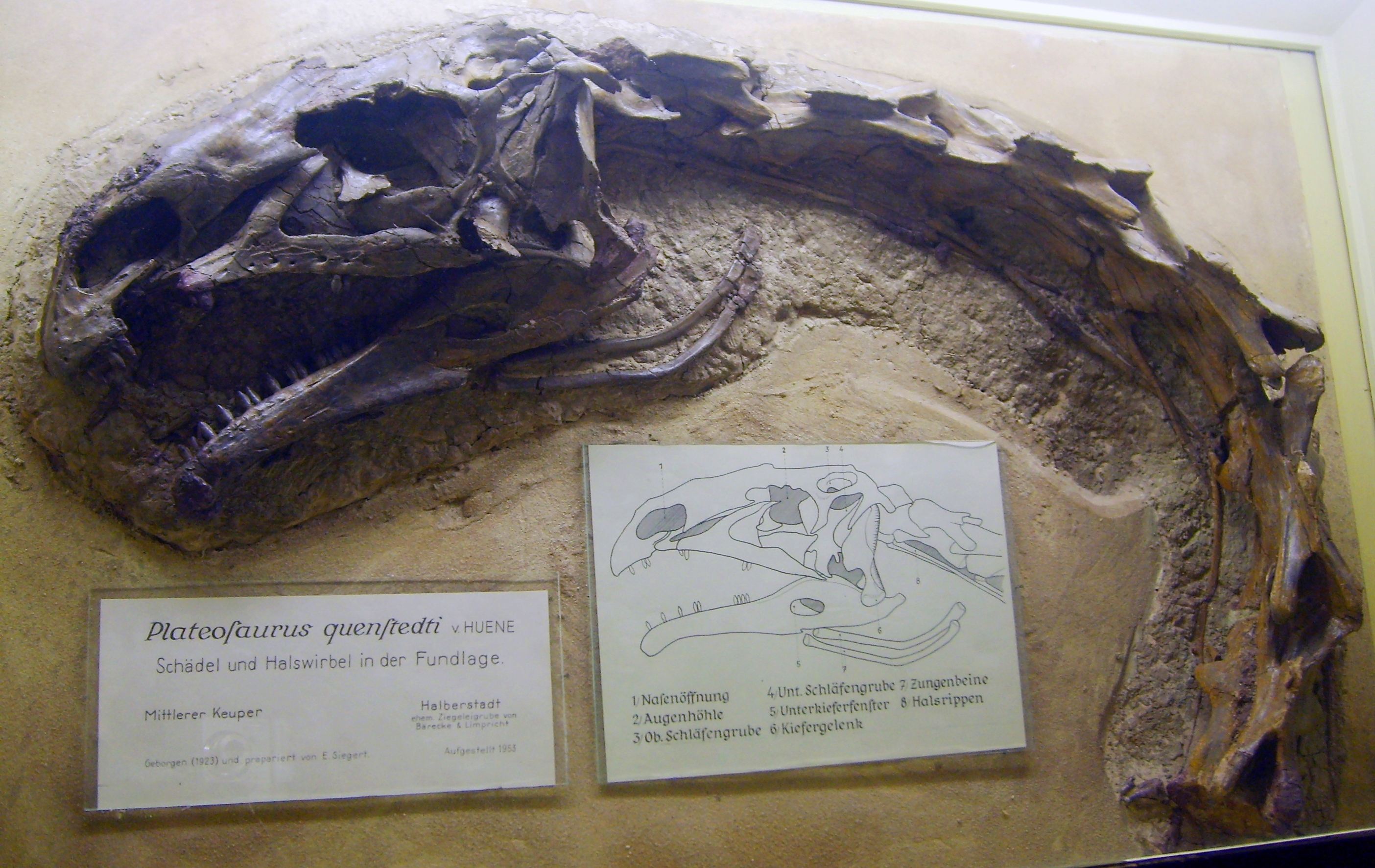
P. engelhardti skull and neck (MB 1927.19.1) previously assigned to P. quenstedti and P. longiceps, at the Museum für Naturkunde, Berlin

All named species of Plateosaurus except the type species, P. gracilis, or P. longiceps have turned out to be junior synonyms of the type species or invalid names. Von Huene practically erected a new species and sometimes a new genus for each relatively complete find from Trossingen (three species of Pachysaurus and seven of Plateosaurus) and Halberstadt (one species of Gresslyosaurus and eight of Plateosaurus). Later, he merged several of these species, but remained convinced that more than one genus and more than one species of Plateosaurus was present in both localities. Jaekel also believed that the Halberstadt material included several plateosaurid dinosaurs, as well as non-plateosaurid prosauropods. Systematic research by Galton drastically reduced the number of genera and species. Galton synonymised all cranial material, and described differences between the syntypes of P. engelhardti and the Trossingen material, which he referred to P. longiceps. Galton recognised P. trossingensis (P. fraasianus and P. integer are junior objective synonyms) to be identical to P. longiceps. Markus Moser, however, showed that P. longiceps is itself a junior synonym of P. engelhardti. Furthermore, a variety of species in other genera were created for material belonging to P. engelhardti, including Dimodosaurus poligniensis, Gresslyosaurus robustus, Gresslyosaurus torgeri, Pachysaurus ajax, Pachysaurus giganteus, Pachysaurus magnus and Pachysaurus wetzelianus. (Note: Moser (2003), summarized on p. 152 (English summary on p. 179)) G. ingens has been considered separate from Plateosaurus, pending a revision of the material.

The skull of AMNH FARB 6810, the best-preserved skull of Plateosaurus that has been taken apart during preparation and is thus available as separate bones, was described anew in 2011. The authors of that publication, palaeontologists Albert Prieto-Márquez and Mark A. Norell, refer the skull to P. erlenbergensis, a species erected in 1905 by Friedrich von Huene and regarded as a synonym of P. engelhardti by Markus Moser. (Note: p. 152 in Moser (2003) (English summary on p. 179)) If the P. erlenbergensis holotype is diagnostic (i.e., has enough characters to be distinct from other material), it is the correct name for the material assigned to P. longiceps Jaekel, 1913.

Aside from fossils clearly belonging to Plateosaurus, there is much prosauropod material from the German Knollenmergel in museum collections, most of it labeled as Plateosaurus, that does not belong to the type species and possibly not to Plateosaurus at all. (Note: p. 152 in Moser (2003) (English summary on p. 179)) Some of this material is not diagnostic; other material has been recognised to be different, but was never sufficiently described. (Note: pp. 193–194 in Jaekel (1913–1914))

== Description ==
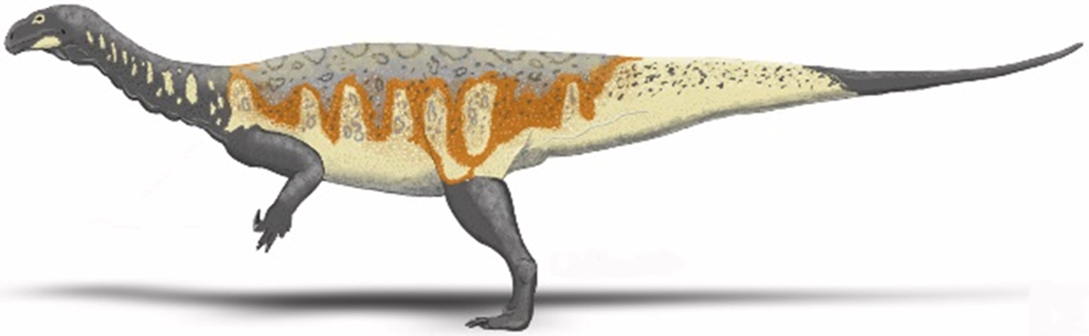
Restoration of P. trossingensis

Plateosaurus had the typical body shape of a herbivorous bipedal dinosaur: a small skull, a long and flexible neck composed of 10 cervical vertebrae, a stocky body, and a long, mobile tail composed of at least 40 caudal vertebrae. The arms of Plateosaurus were very short, even compared to most other "prosauropods". However, they were strongly built, with hands adapted for powerful grasping. The shoulder girdle was narrow (often misaligned in skeletal mounts and drawings), with the clavicles (collar bones) touching at the body's midline, as in other basal sauropodomorphs. The hind limbs were held under the body, with slightly flexed knees and ankles, and the foot was digitigrade, meaning the animal walked on its toes. The proportionally long lower leg and metatarsus show that Plateosaurus could run quickly on its hind limbs. The tail of Plateosaurus was typically dinosaurian, muscular and with high mobility.

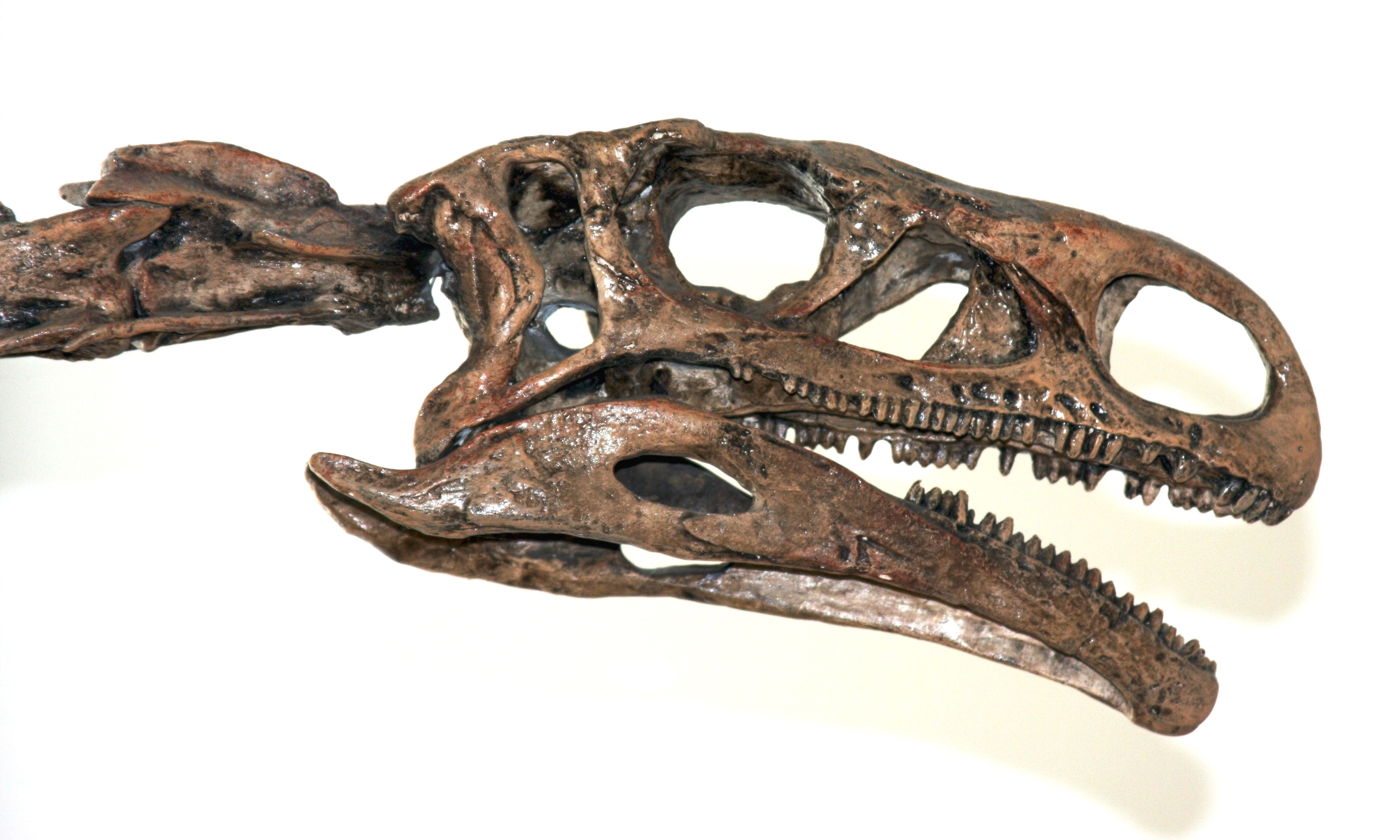
P. trossingensis skull cast, Royal Ontario Museum

The skull of Plateosaurus is small and narrow, rectangular in side view, and nearly three times as long as it is high. There is an almost rectangular lateral temporal foramen at the back. The large, round orbit (eye socket), the sub-triangular antorbital fenestra and the oval naris (nostril) are of almost equal size. The jaws carried many small, leaf-shaped, socketed teeth: 5 to 6 per premaxilla, 24 to 30 per maxilla, and 21 to 28 per dentary (lower jaw). The thick, leaf-shaped, bluntly serrated tooth crowns were suitable for crushing plant material. The low position of the jaw joint gave the chewing muscles great leverage, so that Plateosaurus could deliver a powerful bite. These features suggest that it fed primarily to exclusively on plants. Its eyes were directed to the sides, rather than the front, providing all-round vision to watch for predators. Some fossil skeletons have preserved scleral rings (rings of bone plates that protect the eye).

Size comparison of four Plateosaurus specimens representing two species

The ribs were connected to the dorsal (trunk) vertebrae with two joints, acting together as a simple hinge joint, which has allowed researchers to reconstruct the inhaled and exhaled positions of the ribcage. The difference in volume between these two positions defines the air exchange volume (the amount of air moved with each breath), determined to be approximately 20 L for a P. engelhardti individual estimated to have weighed 690 kg, or 29 mL/kg bodyweight. This is a typical value for birds, but not for mammals, and indicates that Plateosaurus probably had an avian-style flow-through lung, although indicators for postcranial pneumaticity (air sacs of the lung invading the bones to reduce weight) can be found on the bones of only a few individuals, and were only recognised in 2010. Combined with evidence from bone histology this indicates that Plateosaurus was endothermic.

The type species of Plateosaurus is P. trossingensis. Adults of this species reached 4.8 to 10 metres (16 to 33 ft) in length, and ranged in mass from 600 to 4,000 kilograms (1,300 to 8,800 lb). The geologically older species, P. gracilis (formerly named Sellosaurus gracilis), was somewhat smaller, with a total length of 4 to 5 metres (13 to 16 ft).

== Classification ==
Plateosaurus is a member of a group of early herbivores known as "prosauropods". The group is not a monophyletic group (thus given in quotation marks), and most researchers prefer the term basal sauropodomorph. Plateosaurus was the first "prosauropod" to be described, and gives its name to the family Plateosauridae as the type genus. Initially, when the genus was poorly known, it was only included in Sauria, being some kind of reptile, but not in any more narrowly defined taxon. In 1845, von Meyer created the group Pachypodes (a defunct junior synonym of Dinosauria) to include Plateosaurus, Iguanodon, Megalosaurus and Hylaeosaurus. Plateosauridae was proposed by Othniel Charles Marsh in 1895 within Theropoda. Later it was moved to "Prosauropoda" by von Huene, a placement that was accepted by most authors. Before the advent of cladistics in paleontology during the 1980s, with its emphasis on monophyletic groups (clades), Plateosauridae was defined loosely, as large, broad-footed, broad-handed forms with relatively heavy skulls, unlike the smaller "anchisaurids" and sauropod-like "melanorosaurids". Reevaluation of "prosauropods" in light of the new methods of analysis led to the reduction of Plateosauridae. For many years the clade only included Plateosaurus and various junior synonyms, but later two more genera were considered to belong to it: Sellosaurus and possibly Unaysaurus. Of these, Sellosaurus is probably another junior synonym of Plateosaurus.

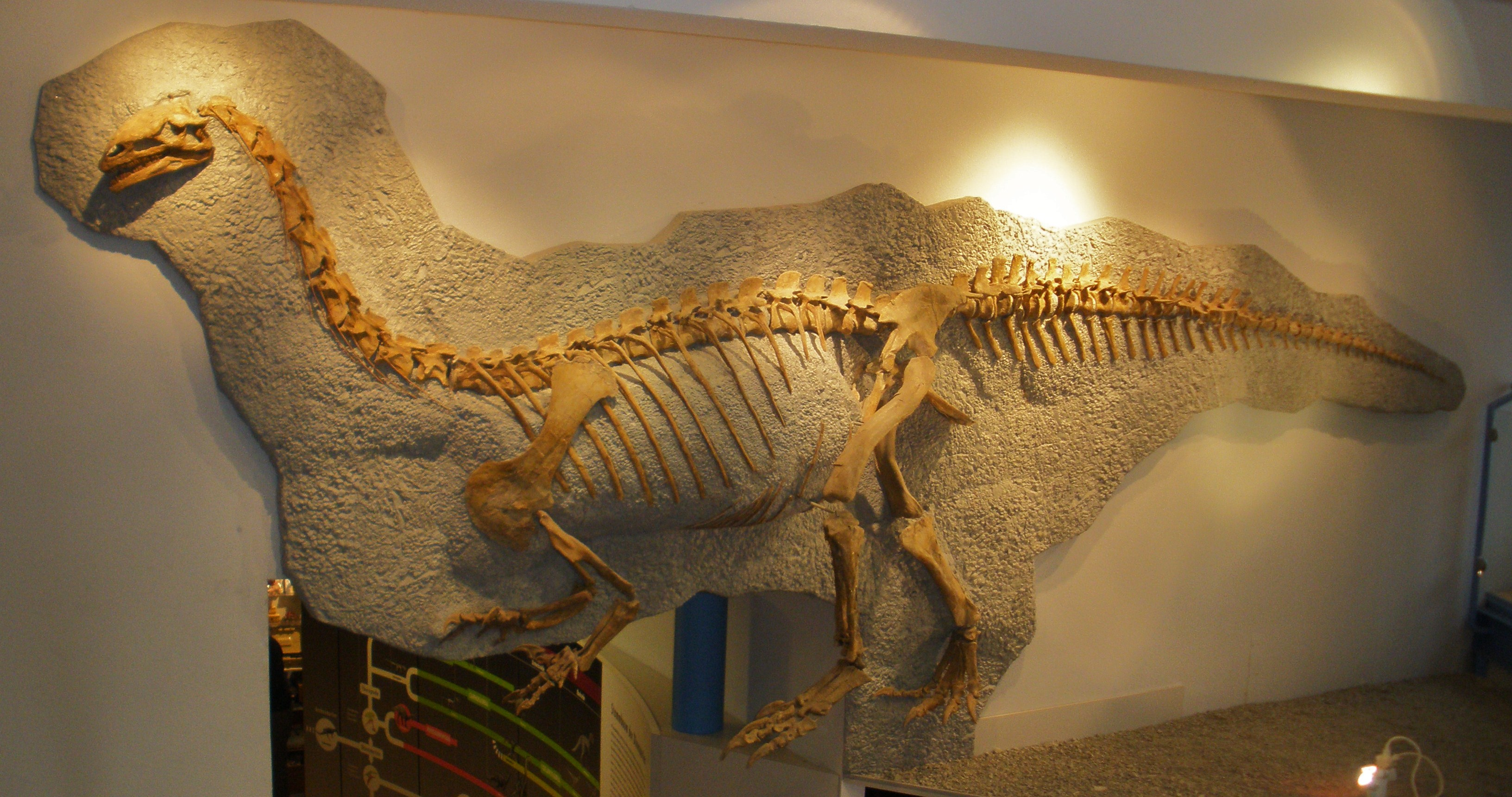
Mounted P. trossingensis skeleton in Sauriermuseum, Frick

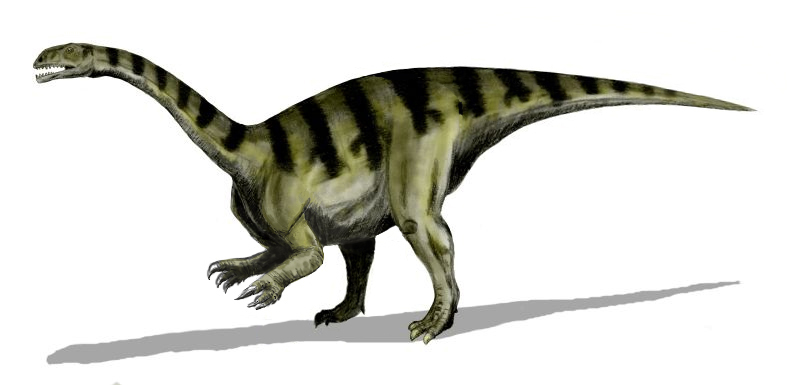
Life restoration of P. gracilis, formerly known as Sellosaurus gracilis

Basal sauropodomorph phylogeny simplified after Yates, 2007. This is only one of many proposed cladograms for basal sauropodomorphs. Some researchers do not agree that plateosaurs were the direct ancestors of sauropods.

- Plateosauria
  - Plateosauridae
    - Unaysaurus
    - Plateosaurus
  - Massopoda
    - Riojasauridae
      - Riojasaurus
      - Eucnemesaurus
    - - Massospondylidae
        - Massospondylus
        - - Coloradisaurus
          - Lufengosaurus
      - - Jingshanosaurus
        - Anchisauria

== Distribution ==
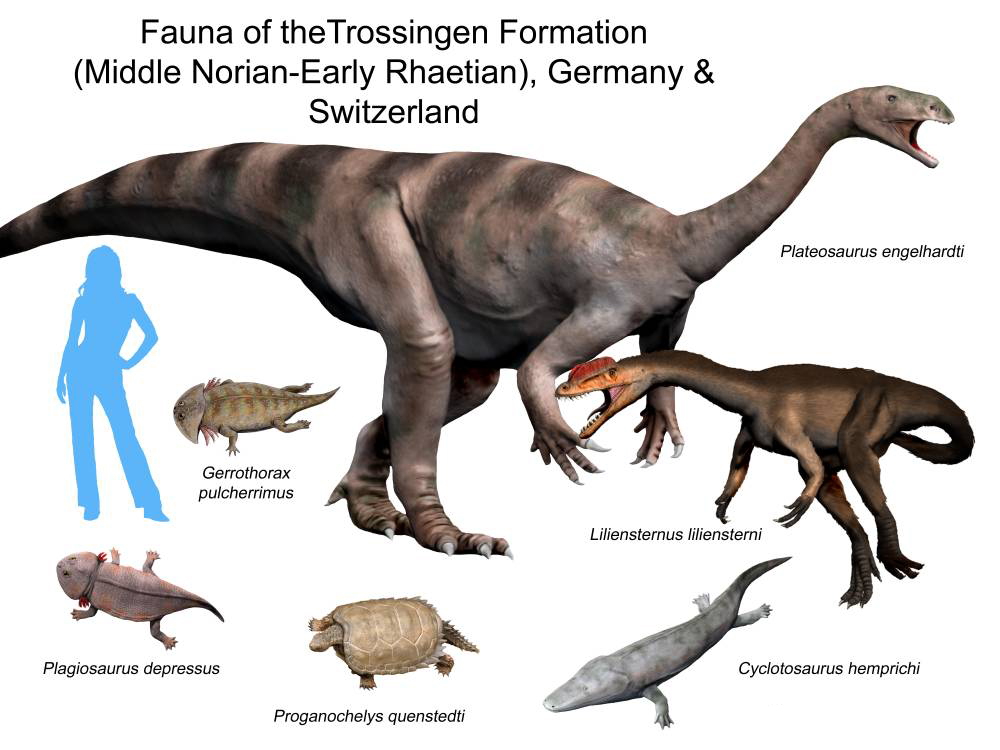
Restoration of Plateosaurus trossingensis and contemporary animals from the Trossingen Formation

Plateosaurus gracilis, the older species, is found in the Löwenstein Formation (lower to middle Norian). (Note: p. 331 in Yates (2003)) P. trossingensis and P. longiceps stem from the Trossingen Formation (upper Norian) and equivalently aged rock units. (Note: p. 332 in Yates (2003))Plateosaurus thus lived probably between approximately 227 and 208.5 million years ago.

== Palaeobiology ==
=== Posture and gait ===
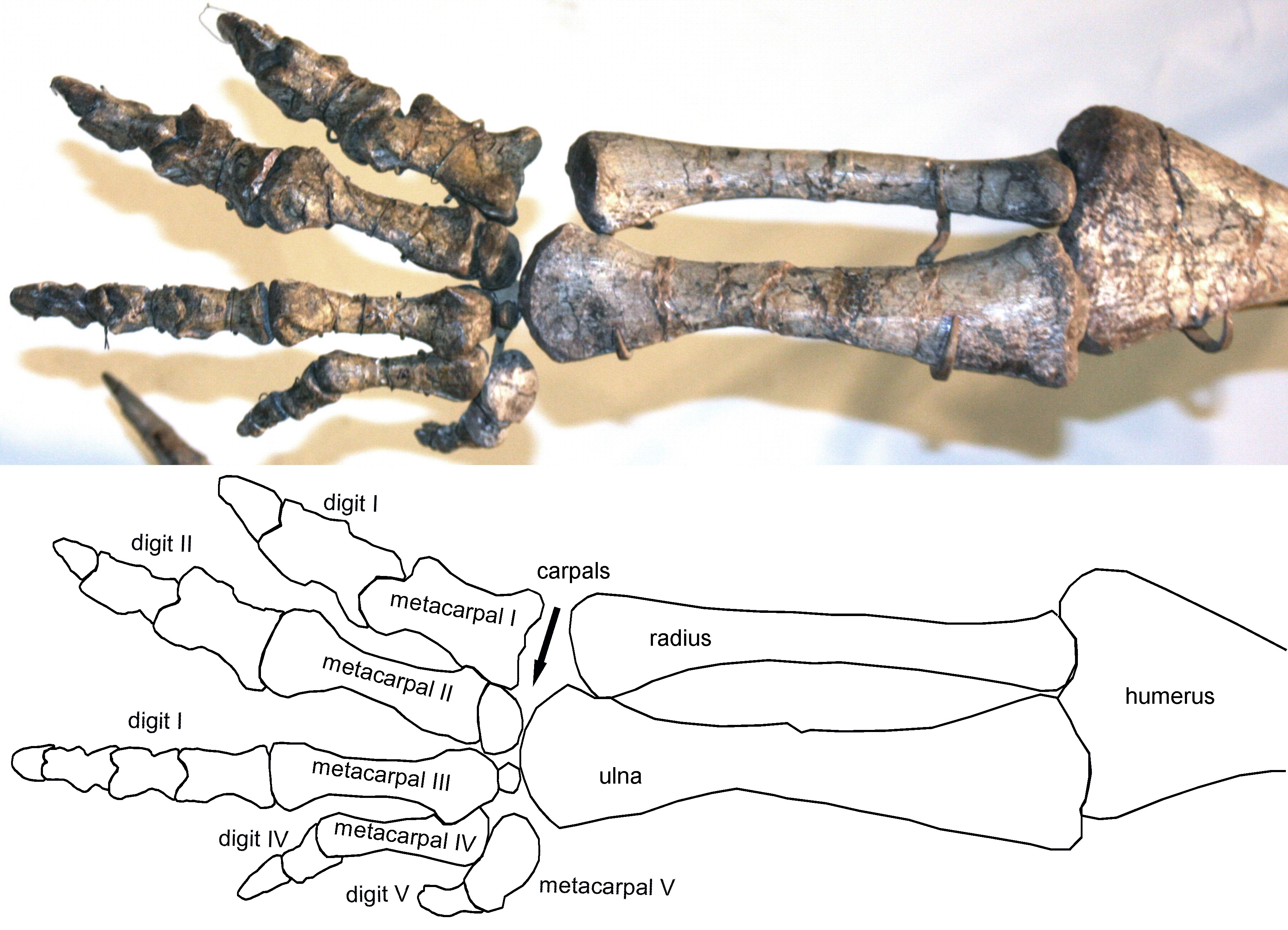
Dorsal view of left lower arm and hand of P. trossingensis ("Skelett 2") at the museum of the Institute for Geosciences of the Eberhard-Karls-University Tübingen, Germany. The shape of the radius dictates that the hand could not be pronated (turned palm down), and thus not play a role in locomotion.

Practically every imaginable posture has been suggested for Plateosaurus in the scientific literature at some point. Von Huene assumed digitigrade bipedality with erect hind limbs for the animals he excavated at Trossingen, with the backbone held at a steep angle (at least during rapid locomotion). In contrast, Jaekel, the main investigator of the Halberstadt material, initially concluded that the animals walked quadrupedally, like lizards, with a sprawling limb position, plantigrade feet, and laterally undulating the body. Only a year later, Jaekel instead favoured a clumsy, kangaroo-like hopping, a change of heart for which he was mocked by German zoologist Gustav Tornier, who interpreted the shape of the articulation surfaces in the hip and shoulder as typically reptilian. Fraas, the first excavator of the Trossingen lagerstätte, also favoured a reptilian posture. Müller-Stoll listed a number of characters required for an erect limb posture that Plateosaurus supposedly lacked, concluding that the lizard-like reconstructions were correct. However, most of these adaptations are actually present in Plateosaurus.

From 1980 on, a better understanding of dinosaur biomechanics, and studies by palaeontologists Andreas Christian and Holger Preuschoft on the resistance to bending of the back of Plateosaurus, led to widespread acceptance of an erect, digitigrade limb posture and a roughly horizontal position of the back. (Note: pp. 138–142 in Moser (2003) (English summary on p. 176)) (Note: p. 145 in Paul (1997)) Many researchers were of the opinion that Plateosaurus could use both quadrupedal gaits (for slow speeds) and bipedal gaits (for rapid locomotion), and Wellnhofer insisted that the tail curved strongly downward, making a bipedal posture impossible. However, Moser showed that the tail was in fact straight. (Note: pp. 142–144 in Moser (2003) (English summary on pp. 176–177))

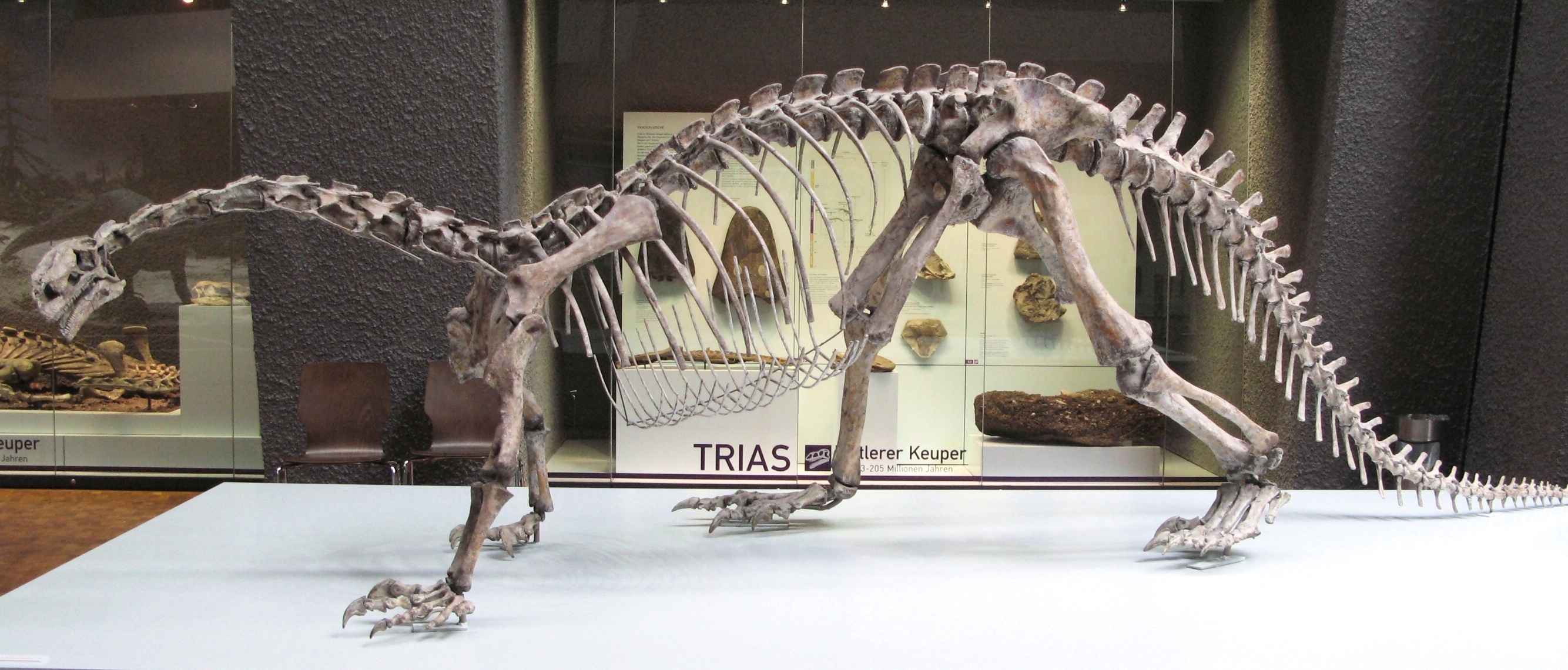
Mounted cast of SMNS 13200, holotype of P. trossingensis. An example of the out-dated skeleton mounts in the State Museum of Natural History Stuttgart in quadrupedal posture. The shoulder girdle is in an anatomically infeasible position, the elbow is disarticulated, and the ribcage has the wrong shape, wide instead of high oval.

The bipedal-quadrupedal consensus was changed by a detailed study of the forelimbs of Plateosaurus by Bonnan and Senter (2007), which clearly showed that Plateosaurus was incapable of pronating its hands. The pronated position in some museum mounts had been achieved by exchanging the position of radius and ulna in the elbow. The lack of forelimb pronation meant that Plateosaurus was an obligate (i.e. unable to walk in any other way) biped. Further indicators for a purely bipedal mode of locomotion are the great difference in limb length (the hind limb is roughly twice as long as the forelimb), the very limited motion range of the forelimb, and the fact that the centre of mass rests squarely over the hind limbs. A recent study based on the cross-sectional geometry of long limb bones, comparisons with extant taxa and inference models also confirmed a bipedal posture and erect stance for Plateosaurus.

Plateosaurus shows a number of cursorial adaptations, including an erect hind limb posture, a relatively long lower leg, an elongated metatarsus and a digitigrade foot posture. However, in contrast to mammalian cursors, the moment arms of the limb extending muscles are short, especially in the ankle, where a distinct, moment arm-increasing tuber on the calcaneum is missing. This means that in contrast to running mammals, Plateosaurus probably did not use gaits with aerial, unsupported phases. Instead, Plateosaurus must have increased speed by using higher stride frequencies, created by rapid and powerful limb retraction. Reliance on limb retraction instead of extension is typical for non-avian dinosaurs.

=== Palaeoecology ===
Important cranial characteristics (such as jaw articulation) of most "prosauropods" are closer to those of herbivorous reptiles than those of carnivorous ones, and the shape of the tooth crown is similar to that of modern herbivorous or omnivorous iguanas. The maximum width of the crown was greater than that of the root for the teeth of most "prosauropods", including Plateosaurus; this results in a cutting edge similar to those of extant herbivorous or omnivorous reptiles. Paul Barrett proposed that prosauropods supplemented their mostly herbivorous diets with small prey or carrion, thus making them omnivores.

So far, no fossil of Plateosaurus has been found with gastroliths (gizzard stones) in the stomach area. The old, widely cited idea that all large dinosaurs, implicitly also Plateosaurus, swallowed gastroliths to digest food because of their relatively limited ability to deal with food orally has been refuted by a study on gastrolith abundance, weight, and surface structure in fossils compared to alligators and ostriches by Oliver Wings. The use of gastroliths for digestion seems to have developed on the line from basal theropods to birds, with a parallel development in Psittacosaurus.

=== Palaeopathology ===
Pathologies affecting the chevrons of specimen SMNS 13200 have been hypothesized to be the result of capture myopathy, induced by a mud-miring trap. Another specimen, SMNS 91296, bears lesions that were most likely caused by a fall or a similar form of trauma. Both of these specimens' palaeopathologies could possibly also be explained as the result of an attack by a predator in which the predator did not penetrate the muscle of the tail far enough to leave any bite traces on the bone.

=== Life history and metabolism ===
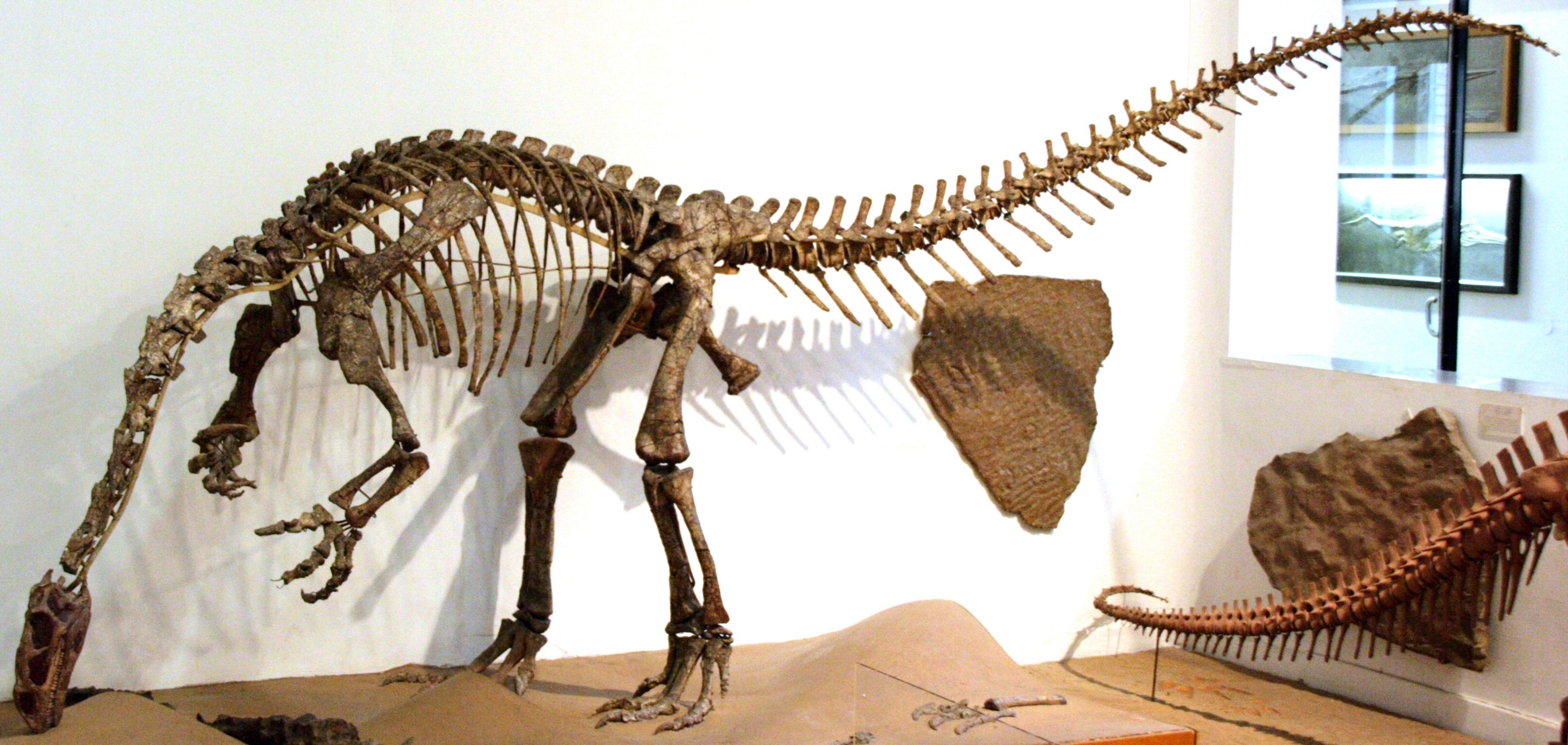
Mount of P. trossingensis GPIT/RE/7288, a nearly complete individual from Trossingen at the museum of the Institute for Geosciences of the Eberhard-Karls-University Tübingen, Germany. Anatomically, this mount created under the direction of Friedrich von Huene is one of the best in the world, epitomising the agile, bipedal and digitigrade view of Plateosaurus confirmed by recent research.

Similar to all non-avian dinosaurs studied to date, Plateosaurus grew in a pattern that is unlike that of both extant mammals and birds. In the closely related sauropods with their typical dinosaurian physiology, growth was initially rapid, continuing somewhat more slowly well beyond sexual maturity, but was determinate, i.e. the animals stopped growing at a maximum size. Mammals grow rapidly, but sexual maturity falls typically at the end of the rapid growth phase. In both groups, the final size is relatively constant, with humans atypically variable. Extant reptiles show a sauropod-like growth pattern, initially rapid, then slowing after sexual maturity, and almost, but not fully, stopping in old age. However, their initial growth rate is much lower than in mammals, birds and dinosaurs. The reptilian growth rate is also very variable, so that individuals of the same age may have very different sizes, and final size also varies significantly. In extant animals, this growth pattern is linked to behavioural thermoregulation and a low metabolic rate (i.e. ectothermy), and is called "developmental plasticity". (Note that is not the same as neural developmental plasticity).

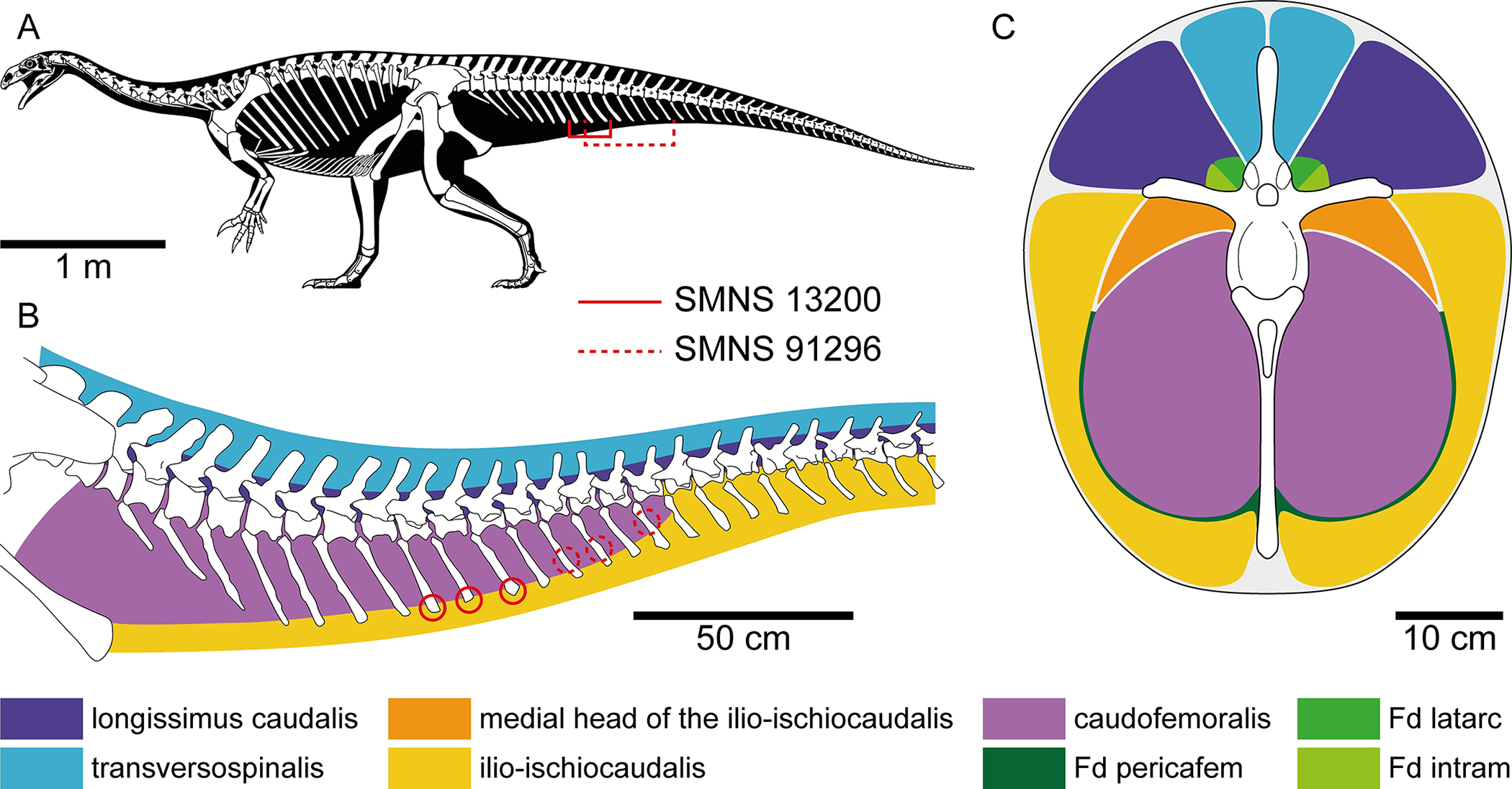
Muscle reconstructions and pathologies of the tail

Plateosaurus followed a trajectory similar to sauropods, but with a varied growth rate and final size as seen in extant reptiles, probably in response to environmental factors such as food availability. Some individuals were fully grown at only 4.8 metres' (16 ft) total length, while others reached 10 metres (33 ft). However, the bone microstructure indicates rapid growth, as in sauropods and extant mammals, which suggests endothermy. Plateosaurus apparently represents an early stage in the development of endothermy, in which endothermy was decoupled from developmental plasticity. This hypothesis is based on a detailed study of Plateosaurus long-bone histology conducted by Martin Sander and Nicole Klein of the University of Bonn. A further indication for endothermy is the avian-style lung of Plateosaurus.

Long-bone histology also allows estimating the age a specific individual reached. Sander and Klein found that some individuals were fully grown at 12 years of age, others were still slowly growing at 20 years, and one individual was still growing rapidly at 18 years. The oldest individual found was 27 years and still growing; most individuals were between 12 and 20 years old. However, some may well have lived much longer, because the fossils from Frick and Trossingen are all animals that died in accidents, and not from old age. Due to the absence of individuals smaller than 4.8 metres (16 ft) long, it is not possible to deduce a complete ontogenetic series for Plateosaurus or determine the growth rate of animals less than 10 years of age.

Comparisons between the scleral rings and estimated orbit size of Plateosaurus and modern birds and reptiles suggest that it may have been cathemeral, active throughout the day and night, possibly avoiding the midday heat.

=== Taphonomy ===
The taphonomy (burial and fossilisation process) of the three main Plateosaurus sites—Trossingen, Halberstadt and Frick—is unusual in several ways. All three sites are nearly monospecific assemblages, meaning that they contain practically only one species, which requires very special circumstances. However, shed teeth of theropods have been found at all three sites, as well as remains of the early turtle Proganochelys. Additionally, a partial "prosauropod" skeleton was found in Halberstadt that does not belong to Plateosaurus, but is preserved in a similar position. All sites yielded almost complete and partial skeletons of Plateosaurus, as well as isolated bones. The partial skeletons tend to include the hind limbs and hips, while parts of the anterior body and neck are rarely found in isolation. The animals were all adults or subadults (nearly adult individuals); no juveniles or hatchlings are known. Complete skeletons and large skeleton parts that include the hind limbs all rest dorsal (top) side up, as do the turtles. Also, they are mostly well-articulated, and the hind limbs are three-dimensionally preserved in a zigzag posture, with the feet often much deeper in the sediment than the hips.

==== Earlier interpretations ====
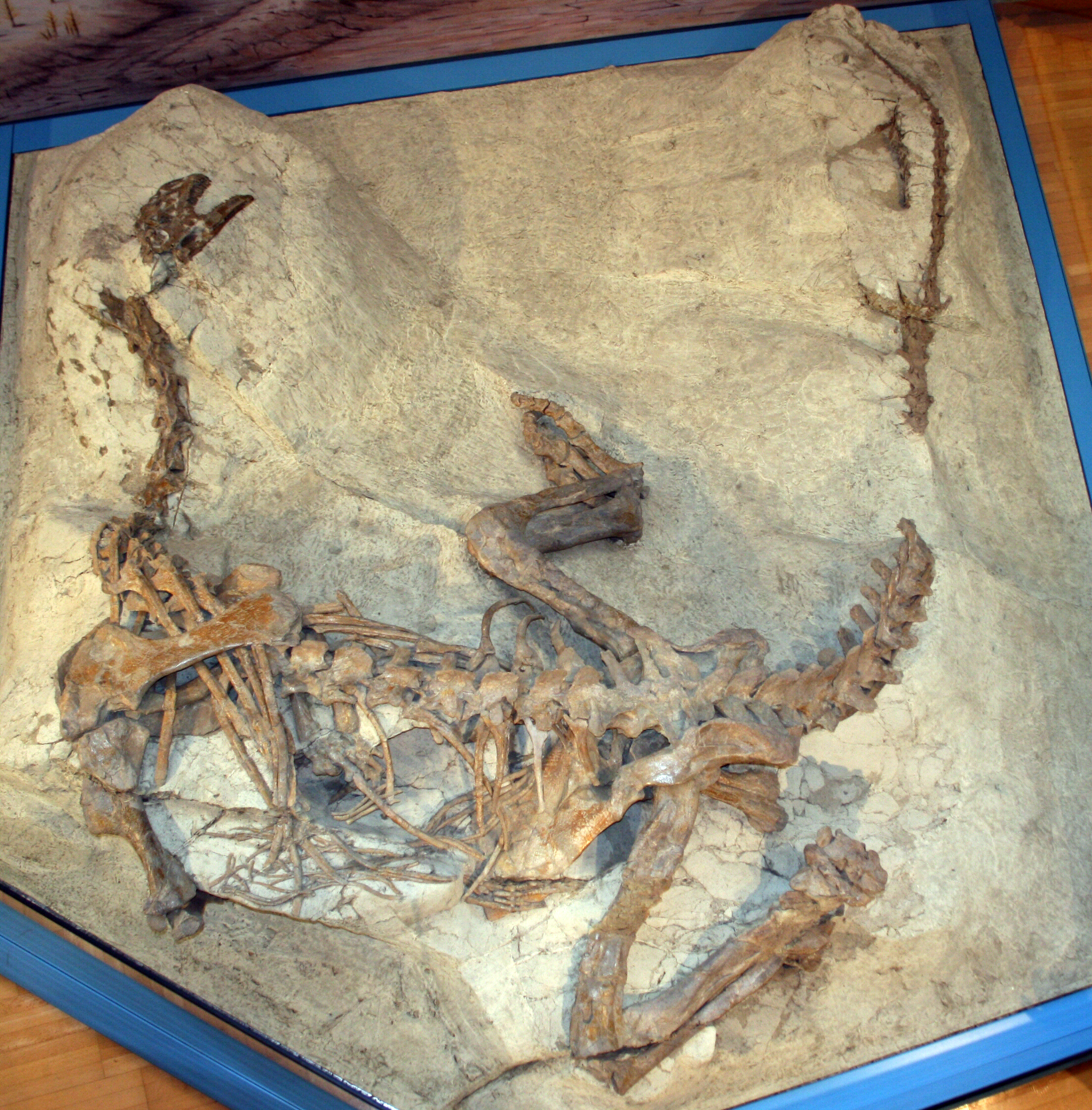
P. engelhardti, collection number MSF 23 of the Sauriermuseum Frick, Switzerland, in dorsal view. This is the most complete Plateosaurus skeleton from Frick.

In the first published discussion of the Trossingen Plateosaurus finds, Fraas suggested that only miring in mud allowed the preservation of the single complete skeleton then known. Similarly, Jaekel interpreted the Halberstadt finds as animals that waded too deep into swamps, became mired and drowned. He interpreted partial remains as having been transported into the deposit by water, and strongly refuted a catastrophic accumulation. In contrast, von Huene interpreted the sediment as aeolian deposits, with the weakest animals, mostly subadults, succumbing to the harsh conditions in the desert and sinking into the mud of ephemeral water holes. He argued that the completeness of many finds indicated that transport did not happen, and saw partial individuals and isolated bones as results of weathering and trampling. Seemann developed a different scenario, in which Plateosaurus herds congregated on large water holes, and some herd members got pushed in. Light animals managed to get free, while heavy individuals got stuck and died.

A different school of thought developed almost half a century later, with palaeontologist David Weishampel suggesting that the skeletons from the lower layers stemmed from a herd that died catastrophically in a mudflow, while those in the upper layers accumulated over time. Weishampel explained the curious monospecific assemblage by theorising that Plateosaurus were common during this period. This theory was erroneously attributed to Seemann in a popular account of the plateosaurs in the collection of the Institute and Museum for Geology and Palaeontology, University of Tübingen, and has since become the standard explanation on most internet sites and in popular books on dinosaurs. Rieber proposed a more elaborate scenario, which included the animals dying of thirst or starvation, and being concentrated by mudflows.

==== Mud-miring trap ====
A detailed re-assessment of the taphonomy by palaeontologist Martin Sander of the University of Bonn, Germany, found that the mud-miring hypothesis first suggested by Fraas is true: animals above a certain body weight sank into the mud, which was further liquefied by their attempts to free themselves. Sander's scenario, similar to that proposed for the famous Rancho La Brea Tar Pits, is the only one explaining all taphonomic data. The degree of completeness of the carcasses was not influenced by transport, which is obvious from the lack of indications for transport before burial, but rather by how much the dead animals were scavenged. Juveniles of Plateosaurus and other taxa of herbivores were too light to sink into the mud or managed to extract themselves, and were thus not preserved. Similarly, scavenging theropods were not trapped due to their lower body weights, combined with proportionally larger feet. There is no indication of herding, or of catastrophic burial of such a herd, or catastrophic accumulation of animals that previously died isolated elsewhere. The palaeopathologies on one specimen of P. trossingenensis are consistent with being caused by the animal being mired in mud and support this hypothesis.
