= Avon Fissure Fill =

Fissure fill in England

- Stratigraphic range: Norian-Hettangian, 216.5–199.6 Ma
- Type: Formation
- Underlies: Lower Carboniferous limestones

Location
- Coordinates: 51.5°N 2.6°W
- Approximate paleocoordinates: 35.9°N 0.8°E
- Region: South West England
- Country: England
- Extent: Avon (now Bristol)

Type section
- Named for: Avon county
- Named by: Henry Riley & Samuel Stutchbury
- Year defined: 1836
- Avon Fissure Fill (England)

The Avon Fissure Fill, also known as the Bristol Fissure Fill or Tytherington Fissure Fill, is a fissure fill in Avon, England (now Bristol) which dates variously from the Norian and Rhaetian stages of the Late Triassic, or possibly as late as the Hettangian stage of the Early Jurassic. The fissure fill at Avon was a sinkhole formed by the dissolution of Lower Carboniferous limestones.

It is paired with the nearby Magnesian Conglomerate; it may have been the same formation as the Magnesian Conglomerate.

== Paleofauna ==
Taxon	Species	Presence	Notes	Images
Agnosphitys	A. cromhallensis	Geographically present in Avon, England (now Bristol).	Its remains include a left ilium (holotype) and a left maxilla, astragalus and humerus (referred specimen).	
Agrosaurus	A. macgillivrayi	Geographically present in Avon, England (now Bristol). Originally believed to have been found in Cape York Peninsula, Queensland (Australia).	A tibia, a claw and some other fragments.	
Asylosaurus	A. yalensis	Geographically present in Avon, England (now Bristol).	Dorsal vertebrae, ribs, gastralia, a shoulder girdle, humeri, a partial forearm, and a hand; additional bones from the neck, tail, pelvis, arm and legs that may represent the same individual.	
Chimaeriformes	Indeterminate	Geographically present in Bristol.	Indeterminate remains.	
Clevosaurus	C. hudsoni	Geographically present in Gloucestershire.	Partial cranial and post-cranial skeleton (holotype).	
Crinoidea	Indeterminate	Geographically present in Bristol.	Reworked from older Carboniferous sediments (Friars Point Limestone Formation).	
Diphydontosaurus	D. avonensis	Geographically present in Bristol.	Complete to near-complete specimens.	
Hybodontiformes?	Indeterminate	Geographically present in Bristol.	Indeterminate remains.	
Gyrolepis	Indeterminate	Geographically present in Bristol.	Indeterminate remains.	
Lissodus	L. minimus	Geographically present in Bristol.	Teeth.	
Palaeosaurus	P. cylindrodon	Geographically present in Avon, England (now Bristol) and Bristol.	Two teeth (one destroyed in 1940).	
Planocephalosaurus	P. robinsonae	Geographically present in Bristol.	Skull (holotype).	
Rhomphaiodon	R. minor	Geographically present in Bristol.	Teeth.	
Rileyasuchus	R. bristolensis	Geographically present in Bristol.	Two vertebrae and a humerus.	
Terrestrisuchus?	Indeterminate	Geographically present in Bristol and South Wales.	Indeterminate remains.	
Theropoda	Indeterminate	Geographically present in Avon, England (now Bristol) and Bristol.	Indeterminate remains. Possibly similar to Pendraig milnerae.	
Thecodontosaurus	T. antiquus	Geographically present in Avon, England (now Bristol) and Bristol.	Partial cranial and postcranial remains (holotype is a lower jaw).	
