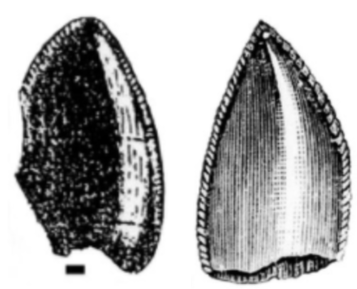
- Teeth BRSMG *Ca7449/4 (left) and BRSMG *Ca7448/3 (right) - of which both comprise the holotype

Scientific classification
- Kingdom: Animalia
- Phylum: Chordata
- Class: Reptilia
- Clade: Archosauria
- Genus: †Palaeosaurus; Riley and Stutchbury, 1836

Type species
- †Palaeosaurus cylindrodon Riley and Stutchbury, 1840

Synonyms
- Palaeosauriscus Kuhn, 1959; Paleosaurus (sic); Palaeosaurus platyodon Riley & Stutchbury, 1836; ?Palaeosaurus stricklandi Davis, 1881

= Palaeosaurus =

Palaeosaurus Temporal range: Late Triassic, ~208–202 Ma

Genus of reptiles (fossil)

Palaeosaurus (or Paleosaurus) is a genus of indeterminate archosaur known from two teeth found in the Bromsgrove Sandstone Formation and also either the Magnesian Conglomerate or the Avon Fissure Fill of Clifton, Bristol, England (originally Avon). It has had a convoluted taxonomic history.

Richard Owen's mistake of associating prosauropod skeletal remains with the carnivorous teeth which Riley and Stutchbury called Palaeosaurus, combined with Friedrich von Huene's Teratosaurus minor, which was also a combination of carnivore and prosauropod remains, led paleontologists to view prosauropods as carnivorous animals for quite a long time. This error was included in several textbooks and other dinosaur reference works.

== History and classification ==
=== Nineteenth century ===
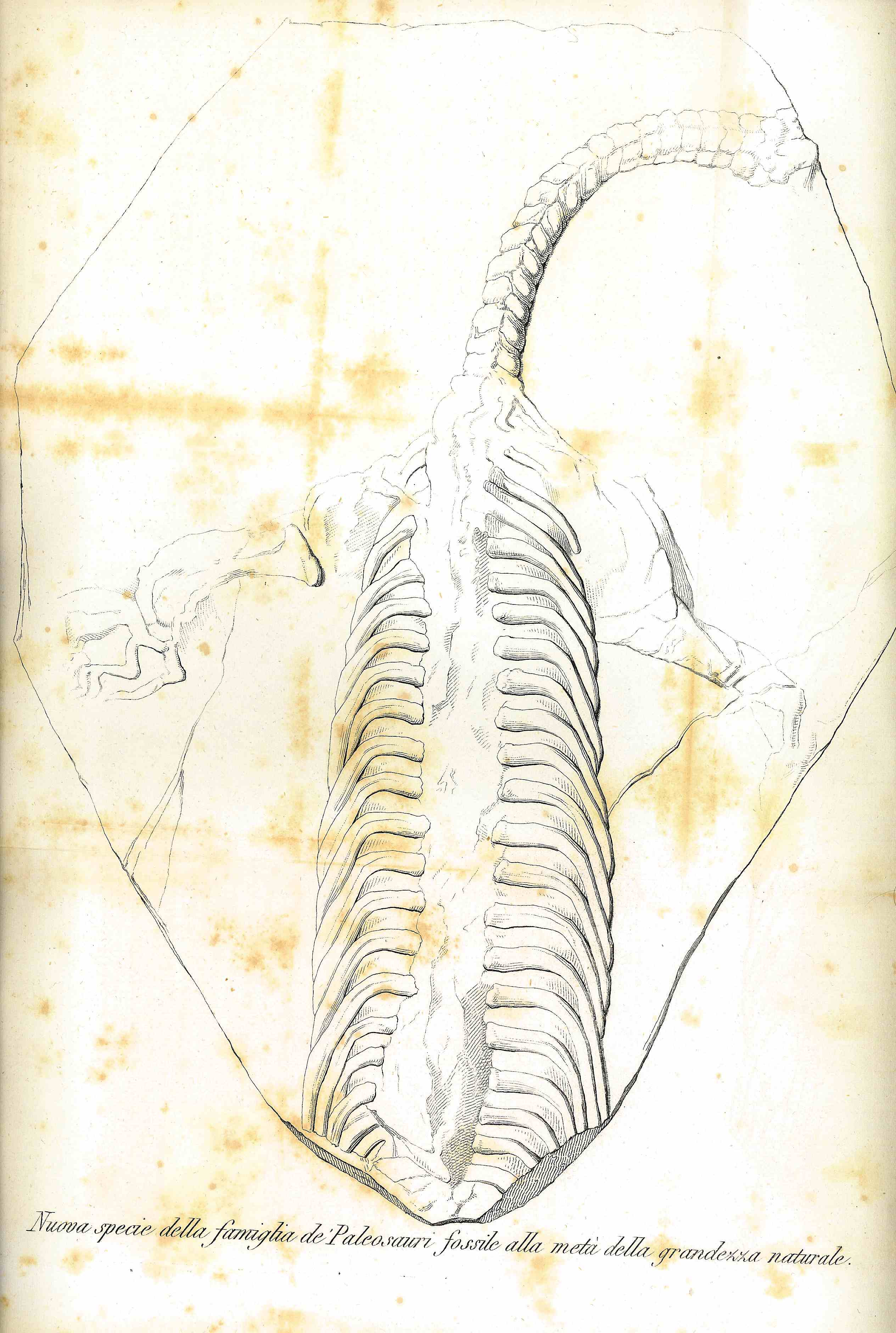
The earliest drawing of a fossil captioned Palaeosaurus that did not belong to Palaeosaurus. This fossil has since been lost and it probably belonged to an indeterminate archosaur separate from Palaeosaurus (drawn in 1839 by Carlo Cattaneo for the first issue of Il Politecnico)

In the autumn of 1834, surgeon Henry Riley (1797–1848) and the curator of the Bristol Institution, Samuel Stutchbury (15 January 1798 – 12 February 1859), began to excavate "saurian remains" at the quarry of Durdham Down, at Clifton, presently a part of Bristol, which is part of the Magnesian Conglomerate. In 1834 and 1835, they briefly reported on the finds. They provided their initial description in 1836, naming two new genera: Palaeosaurus and Thecodontosaurus. In 1836 Riley and Stutchbury briefly and informally published on two new fossil teeth (the holotype tooth of P. platyodon is listed under BRSMG *Ca7448/3 and the holotype tooth of P. cylindrodon is listed under BRSMG *Ca7449/4. Both are now listed under the latter species) found in or near the city of Bristol, England, which they called Palaeosaurus cylindrodon and Palaeosaurus platyodon. Riley and Stutchbury did not mean to assign these species to Saint-Hilaire's genus of teleosaurids; they simply did not know the name had been used. Thecodontosaurus was also named in this publication. Only in 1840 do Riley and Stutchbury fully describe their two species of Palaeosaurus, each based on a single sharp tooth from the Late Triassic Period. The spellings were then corrected to read Paleosaurus cylindrodon and Paleosaurus platyodon.

In 1842, Sir Richard Owen created the name Dinosauria. In the same publication, he attempted to redescribe Riley and Stutchbury's Paleosaurus and Thecodontosaurus, which he did not consider to be dinosaurs. Not knowing of the change in spelling, he changed the name back to Palaeosaurus, and this spelling was followed by all subsequent authors until 1959. Owen assigns other bones to Palaeosaurus, which would later be re-classified to the prosauropod dinosaur Thecodontosaurus. Contrary to Owen, in 1870, Thomas Henry Huxley described both Thecodontosaurus and Palaeosaurus as dinosaurs for the first time. He considered Palaeosaurus platyodon to be synonymous with Thecodontosaurus antiquus, most likely due to the Thecodontosaurus bones that Owen assigned to the former genus. However, Huxley regarded P. cylindrodon as an unrelated carnivorous theropod.

American paleontologist Edward Drinker Cope named a third species, Palaeosaurus fraserianus, in 1878, for an isolated tooth found in Triassic rocks in Pennsylvania. Today these are regarded as belonging to an indeterminate sauropodomorph dinosaur unrelated to Palaeosaurus. In 1881, a fourth species is created, Palaeosaurus stricklandi; these are now recognized to be those of a phytosaur.

=== Twentieth century ===
Von Huene, in 1908, recognized the tooth of Palaeosaurus platyodon belonged to a phytosaur and placed it into the new genus Rileya, forming the new combination Rileya platyodon.

One of the holotype teeth of P. cylindrodon, presumably BRSMG *Ca7448/3, was destroyed during World War II, in 1940. The other tooth survives to this day.

In 1959 German paleontologist Oskar Kuhn, for the first time since 1840, recognized that the genus Palaeosaurus created by Riley and Stutchbury in 1836 was preoccupied and created the new generic name Palaeosauriscus to contain Palaeosaurus cylindrodon and all other species that had previously been described under Palaeosaurus.

In 1964, Owen's mis-classified specimens caused American Edwin Harris Colbert to classify prosauropods into two groups – Palaeosauria, which included Palaeosaurus and Teratosaurus, thought to be carnivorous because of the chimaeric nature of Palaeosaurus; and Plateosauria, which included Thecodontosaurus and Plateosaurus, which had been described with the correct skulls, and therefore were correctly described as a herbivorous group.

=== Twenty-first century ===
Thecodontosaurus was redescribed by a team of paleontologists led by Michael Benton in 2000, which placed Owen's misclassified material under the genus Thecodontosaurus rather than Palaeosaurus, and this is still followed today. Most of the skeletal bones ever assigned to Palaeosaurus cylindrodon and P. platyodon were also reassigned to Thecodontosaurus. The genera Rileya and Palaeosauriscus, as well as the species Palaeosaurus cylindrodon and Palaeosaurus platyodon, were all declared nomina dubia.

In 2007, Peter Galton, reviewing the archosaurian fossils of the 1834 Bristol finds, reaffirmed the identification of the two teeth and humeri of Palaeosaurus platyodon (Rileya) as belonging to a phytosaur, and regarded P. cylindrodon (Palaeosauriscus) as an indeterminate archosaur. He agreed with Benton that Rileya is dubious, but suggested that Palaeosauriscus may be valid, based on its now-destroyed tooth with a "subcircular cross-section and fine, obliquely inclined denticles".

=== Efraasia and Sellosaurus ===
In 1932, Von Huene assigned new material to Palaeosaurus; numerous prosauropod bones were found in Germany. Because of Owen's Thecodontosaurus bones misassigned to Palaeosaurus cylindrodon, the species was thought to be a prosauropod. Von Huene therefore referred his new species to Palaeosaurus, creating the name P. diagnostica.

In 1973, Peter Galton, a British paleontologist, moved the species into its own genus, creating the new combination Efraasia diagnosticus. For several decades, most scientists considered Efraasia a junior synonym of Sellosaurus; however, in 2003 Adam Yates, another British palaeontologist, redescribed the bones assigned to Sellosaurus. He resurrected the genus Efraasia for some of these bones, to which he also assigned the bones that had been first described as Teratosaurus minor as well (although leaving out the teeth, which were recognized as non-dinosaurian). Like Galton in 1973, Yates's Efraasia also included the remains previously known as Palaeosaurus diagnosticus, although unlike Galton, Yates calls the species Efraasia minor, synonymizing both species. E. minor was claimed to have priority because von Huene described Teratosaurus minor several pages before Palaeosaurus diagnosticus in his 1908 publication. The name minor therefore, would take precedence over diagnostica for this species.

=== Species ===
Type species: "Palaeosaurus" cylindrodon (nomen dubium) Riley and Stutchbury 1836 (an indeterminate archosauromorph later renamed the type species of Palaeosauriscus cylindrodon, as Palaeosaurus was pre-occupied)

Other species:

- "Palaeosaurus" fraserianus (nomen dubium) Cope 1878 (an indeterminate sauropodomorph later renamed to Palaeosauriscus fraserianus)
- "Palaeosaurus" platyodon (nomen dubium) Riley and Stutchbury 1836 (an indeterminate phytosaur later renamed the type species of the genus Rileyasuchus)
- "Palaeosaurus" stricklandi (nomen dubium) Davis 1881 (an indeterminate phytosaur later transferred to the genus Palaeosauriscus)
- "Palaeosaurus" diagnosticus Fraas, 1912 (alternatively spelled P. diagnostica, described by Eberhard Fraas in 1912, and re-classified as P.? diagnosticus be von Huenn in 1936; now assigned to Efraasia.

== See also ==
- Rileyasuchus
- Efraasia
