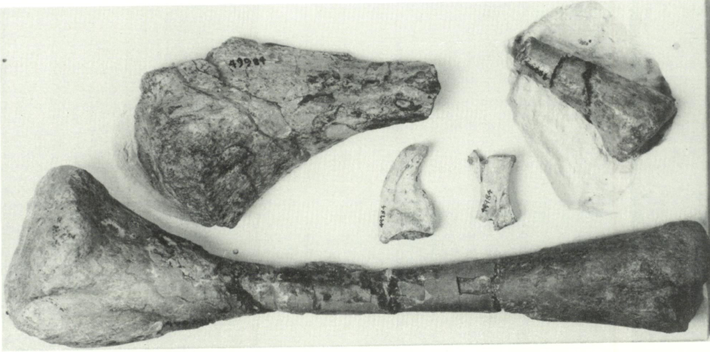
- Holotype

Scientific classification
- Kingdom: Animalia
- Phylum: Chordata
- Class: Reptilia
- Clade: Dinosauria
- Clade: Saurischia
- Clade: †Sauropodomorpha
- Family: †Thecodontosauridae
- Genus: †Agrosaurus; Seeley, 1891
- Species: †A. macgillivrayi

Binomial name
- †Agrosaurus macgillivrayi Seeley, 1891

Synonyms
- Thecodontosaurus macgillivrayi von Huene, 1906

= Agrosaurus =

Agrosaurus Temporal range: Rhaetian, 206–202 Ma

Extinct genus of reptiles

Agrosaurus (/ˌæɡroʊˈsɔːrəs/; perhaps from Greek agros meaning 'field' and sauros meaning 'lizard', "field lizard") is a potentially dubious genus of thecodontosaurid sauropodomorph probably originating from the Magnesian Conglomerate of England that was originally believed to be a Triassic prosauropod from Australia. Agrosaurus would thus be the oldest dinosaur from that country. However, this appears to have been an error, and the material actually appears to come from Thecodontosaurus or a Thecodontosaurus-like animal from Bristol, England (Avon Fissure Fill). The type species is Agrosaurus macgillivrayi.

== History ==
=== Discovery and naming ===
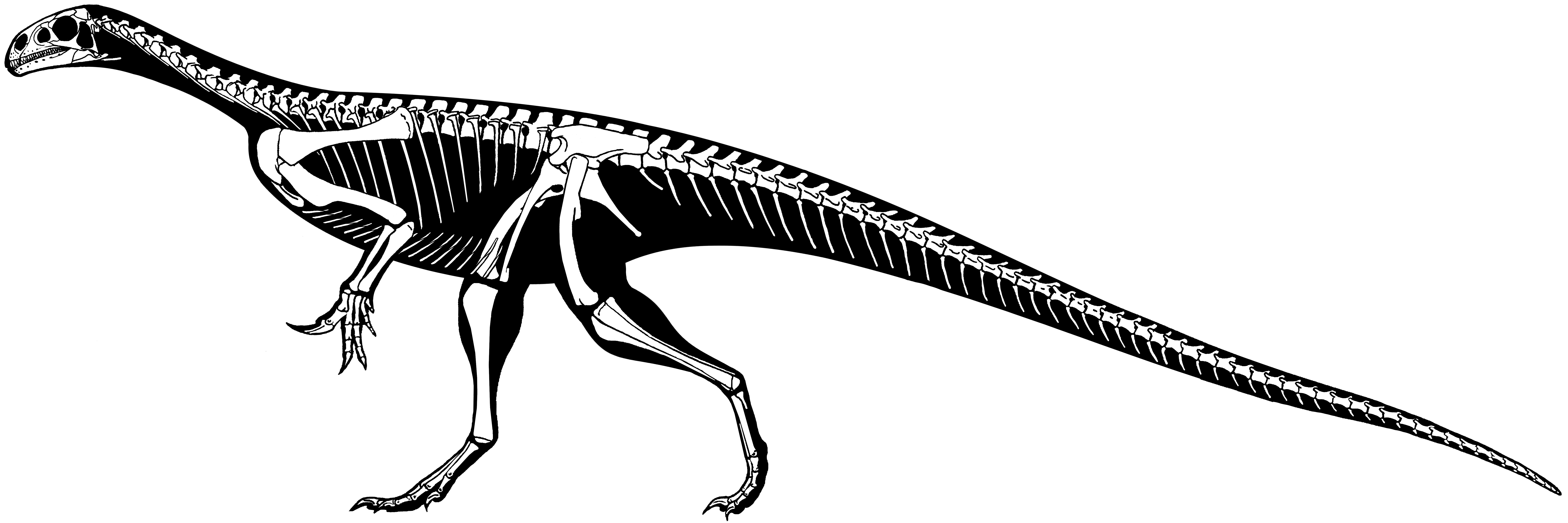
Reconstructed skeleton of Thecodontosaurus, with which Agrosaurus may be synonymous

Members of an expedition from the British sloop-of-war HMS Fly supposedly collected two tibiae, a fibula and two foot claws as well as some other fragments in 1844 while erecting a beacon on the coast of Cape York, Queensland in Australia. The context of the discovery is uncertain, as it is not mentioned in books by expedition naturalist John MacGallivray, nor in a 1847 book on the voyage by geologist Joseph Beete-Jukes.

The bones were probably instead collected during the autumn of 1834 in the Magnesian Conglomerate of Bristol by Henry Riley and Samuel Stutchbury.

The original block was purchased by the British Museum of Natural History in 1879, from Edward Charlesworth selling the collection of the late Samuel Long Waring, and given the inventory number BMNH 49984, but the remains were not studied until 1891. Harry Govier Seeley in that year named it Agrosaurus macgillivrayi, not giving an etymology.

=== Later study ===
The block was prepared in the late 1980s, the bones being freed from the matrix by an acid bath. Following the preparation, Ralph Molnar (1991) noticed similarities to the basal sauropodomorph Massospondylus. Galton and Cluver (1976) saw Agrosaurus as close to Anchisaurus. Vickers-Rich, Rich, McNamara and Milner (1999) equated Agrosaurus and Thecodontosaurus antiquus, claiming that the British Museum remains were mislabelled.

The matrix in which the bones were preserved was tested with rocks of similar age in Cape York and Durdham Downs, the latter being beds where Thecodontosaurus remains have been found in the Bristol area of England. The English beds compared most favourably.

=== Reinterpretation as a genus of English origin ===
As early as 1906, Friedrich von Huene had described the rock matrix as 'extremely reminiscent of the bone breccia at Durdham Downs near Bristol' and had renamed the species Thecodontosaurus macgillivrayi.

Remains of the jaw of a sphenodont identical to Diphydontosaurus avonis, a lizard-like reptile common to the Bristol Triassic beds have been extracted from the same matrix as the holotype. This reinterpretation of Agrosaurus as a misidentified British specimen has been accepted in later works.

== Description ==
From the scant remains the living animal would appear to have been about three metres long (10 ft), with a typical basal sauropodomorph appearance: bulky body, long neck, small head and clawed feet. It was probably mainly bipedal, running on its elongated hind legs. It was herbivorous or may have been an omnivore, supplementing its herbivorous diet with small prey or carrion.

== Classification ==
The name Agrosaurus is now generally considered to be a nomen dubium or a junior synonym of Thecodontosaurus. If Agrosaurus is not from Australia, which seems most probable, Rhoetosaurus and Ozraptor, both from the Bajocian (Middle Jurassic) would be the oldest known Australian dinosaurs. They are well documented.

Agrosaurus has been placed within Thecodontosauridae.

== See also ==
- Thecodontosaurus
