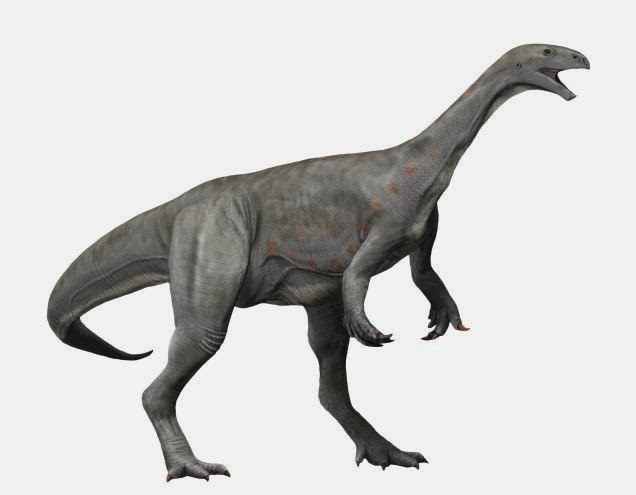
- Life restoration

Scientific classification
- Kingdom: Animalia
- Phylum: Chordata
- Class: Reptilia
- Clade: Dinosauria
- Clade: Saurischia
- Clade: †Sauropodomorpha
- Genus: †Asylosaurus; Galton, 2007
- Species: †A. yalensis

Binomial name
- †Asylosaurus yalensis Galton, 2007

= Asylosaurus =

Asylosaurus Temporal range: Late Triassic, Rhaetian

Extinct genus of dinosaurs

Asylosaurus (meaning "unharmed or sanctuary lizard") is a genus of basal sauropodomorph dinosaur from the Late Triassic Avon Fissure Fill of England. It is based on partial remains, discovered in the autumn of 1834, described in 1836 by Henry Riley and Samuel Stutchbury as pertaining to Thecodontosaurus, that Othniel Charles Marsh brought to Yale University between 1888 and 1890. These remains thus escaped destruction by a bombardment in 1940 during World War II, unlike the original holotype of Thecodontosaurus. Asylosaurus was described in 2007 by Peter Galton. The type species is A. yalensis, referring to Yale. The bones originally came from a Rhaetian-age cave fill at Durdham Down, Clifton, Bristol.

Asylosaurus is based on YPM 2195, a partial skeleton of the torso region, including back vertebrae, ribs, gastralia, a shoulder girdle, humeri, a partial forearm, and a hand; additional bones from the neck, tail, pelvis, arm and leg that may represent the same individual were also referred to Asylosaurus. It differs from Thecodontosaurus and Pantydraco, contemporaneous basal sauropodomorphs of similar builds, in the structure of its humerus (upper arm). It may have had a separate ecological niche from these other related animals based on how omnivorous or herbivorous it was. According to Gregory S. Paul, it was 2 metres (6 ft 7 in) long and its weight was about 250 kilograms (550 lb).
