= Magnesian Conglomerate =

Geological formation in the United Kingdom

- Stratigraphic range: Rhaetian; ~208–202 Ma Possible extension into the Carnian
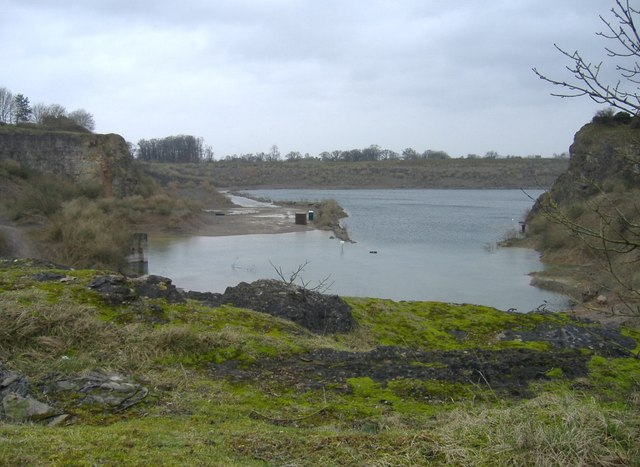
- Slickstones Quarry, where an outcrop of the Magnesian Conglomerate is present
- Type: Geological formation, fissure fill
- Underlies: none
- Overlies: Friars Point Limestone Formation?

Lithology
- Primary: Breccia
- Other: Limestone

Location
- Coordinates: 51.5°N 2.6°W
- Approximate paleocoordinates: 35.9°N 0.8°E
- Region: South West England & South Wales
- Country: England
- Extent: Bristol

Type section
- Named by: Henry Riley & Samuel Stutchbury
- Year defined: 1836
- Magnesian Conglomerate (England)

The Magnesian Conglomerate is a geological formation in Clifton, Bristol in England (originally Avon), Gloucestershire and southern Wales, present in Tytherington, Durdham Down, Slickstones Quarry and Cromhall Quarry.

It is traditionally considered to date back to the Rhaetian stage of the Late Triassic, although it may be as old as the Carnian stage of the Late Triassic, having formed during the Carnian pluvial episode.

The Magnesian Conglomerate was first discovered in autumn 1834 and was studied in 1836 by Henry Riley and Samuel Stutchbury.

The Avon Fissure Fill is often paired with the Magnesian Conglomerate.

== Vertebrate paleofauna ==
Taxon	Species	Presence	Notes	Images
Actinopteri	Indeterminate	Geographically present in Durdham Down.	A tooth.	
Agnosphitys	A. cromhallensis	Geographically present in Avon, England (now Bristol).	Its remains include a left ilium (holotype) and a left maxilla, astragalus and humerus (referred specimen).	
Agrosaurus	A. macgillivrayi	Geographically present in Avon, England (now Bristol). Originally believed to have been found in Cape York Peninsula, Queensland (Australia).	A tibia, a claw and some other fragments.	
Archosauria	Indeterminate	Geographically present in Durdham Down.	Five specimens, including jaw fragments, caudals, and a scapulocoracoid.	
Archosauromorpha	Indeterminate	Geographically present in Durdham Down.	A fragment of a small tooth.	
Asylosaurus	A. yalensis	Geographically present in Avon, England (now Bristol).	Dorsal vertebrae, ribs, gastralia, a shoulder girdle, humeri, a partial forearm, and a hand; additional bones from the neck, tail, pelvis, arm and legs that may represent the same individual.	
Chimaeriformes	Indeterminate	Geographically present in Bristol.	Indeterminate remains.	
Clevosaurus	C. hudsoni	Geographically present in Gloucestershire.	Partial cranial and post-cranial skeleton (holotype).	
Crinoidea	Indeterminate	Geographically present in Bristol.	Reworked from older Carboniferous sediments (Friars Point Limestone Formation).	
Cryptovaranoides	C. microlanius	Geographically present in Slickstones Quarry.	Holotype (partial skeleton) and referred isolated remains.	
Diphydontosaurus	D. avonensis	Geographically present in Bristol.	Complete to near-complete specimens.	
Herrerasauria?	Indeterminate	Geographically present in Durdham Down.	3 indeterminate specimens.	
Hwiccewyrm	H. trispiculum	Geographically present in Slickstones Quarry.	Several specimens comprising a partial skeleton. Discovered during the 1970s and listed as cf. Hypsognathus by Whiteside et al. (2016).	
Hybodontiformes?	Indeterminate	Geographically present in Bristol.	Indeterminate remains.	
Gyrolepis	Indeterminate	Geographically present in Bristol.	Indeterminate remains.	
Kuehneosauridae	Indeterminate	Geographically present in Durdham Down.	Rib that may instead be an ulna belonging to Terrestrisuchus.	
Lissodus	L. minimus	Geographically present in Bristol.	Teeth.	
Ornithischia	Indeterminate	Geographically present in Durdham Down.	Indeterminate specimen.	
Palaeosaurus	P. cylindrodon	Geographically present in Avon, England (now Bristol) and Bristol.	Two teeth (one destroyed in 1940).	
Phytosauria	Indeterminate	Geographically present in Durdham Down.	Two teeth previously assigned to Mystriosuchinae.	
Planocephalosaurus	P. robinsonae	Geographically present in Bristol.	Skull (holotype) and a tooth.	
Plateosauria	Indeterminate	Geographically present in Durdham Down.	22 partial specimens.	
Rhomphaiodon	R. minor	Geographically present in Bristol.	Teeth, including the subsidiary cusp of one tooth.	
Rileyasuchus	R. bristolensis	Geographically present in Bristol.	Two vertebrae and a humerus.	
Sauropodomorpha	Indeterminate	Geographically present in Durdham Down.	Indeterminate remains.	
Sphenosuchia	Indeterminate	Geographically present in Durdham Down.	A right femur initially named as Thecodontosaurus costa.	
Terrestrisuchus	T. gracilis and indeterminate	Geographically present in Bristol and South Wales.	Indeterminate and partial remains.	
Theropoda	Indeterminate	Geographically present in Avon, England (now Bristol) and Bristol.	A tooth, and a tibia that was once allied with Thecodontosaurus. Possibly similar to Pendraig milnerae.	
Thecodontosaurus	T. antiquus	Geographically present in Avon, England (now Bristol) and Bristol.	Partial cranial and postcranial remains (holotype is a lower jaw).	

== See also ==
- List of dinosaur-bearing rock formations
- List of fossiliferous stratigraphic units in England
