= Rileyasuchus =

Rileyasuchus Temporal range: Late Triassic, Rhaetian

Scientific classification
- Kingdom: Animalia
- Phylum: Chordata
- Class: Reptilia
- Order: †Phytosauria
- Genus: †Rileyasuchus; Kuhn, 1961
- Species: †R. bristolensis

Binomial name
- †Rileyasuchus bristolensis (von Huene, 1902)

Synonyms
- Rileya bristolensis von Huene, 1902 (preoccupied)

Genus of reptiles

Rileyasuchus is a genus of phytosaur from the Rhaetian (Late Triassic) Magnesian Conglomerate of England. It has a confusing history, being associated with the taxonomy of Palaeosaurus and Thecodontosaurus, and being a replacement name for a preoccupied genus (Rileya, which had already been used by Ashmead, and Howard both in 1888 for a hymenopteran).

== History and taxonomy ==
In 1902, Friedrich von Huene named the new genus for two vertebrae and a humerus from deposits in Bristol. He had recognized it as a phytosaur by 1908 (by which point a few Palaeosaurus species had been added to the genus).

It seems to have sat unrecognized for most of the 20th century, except for 1961 when Oskar Kuhn renamed it from Rileya to Rileyasuchus. Adrian Hunt in 1994 (doctoral dissertation) first suggested that it was a herrerasaurid, although this was never published. Benton et al. (2000) indicated that the type specimen was actually a chimera composed of a phytosaur humerus and Thecodontosaurus vertebrae. It is best regarded as a nomen dubium.

Rileya was named after palaeontologist and surgeon Henry Riley who helped to discover the first known fossils in Bristol in 1834.

== Paleobiology ==
As a phytosaur, it would have been a semi-aquatic crocodile-like predator.
