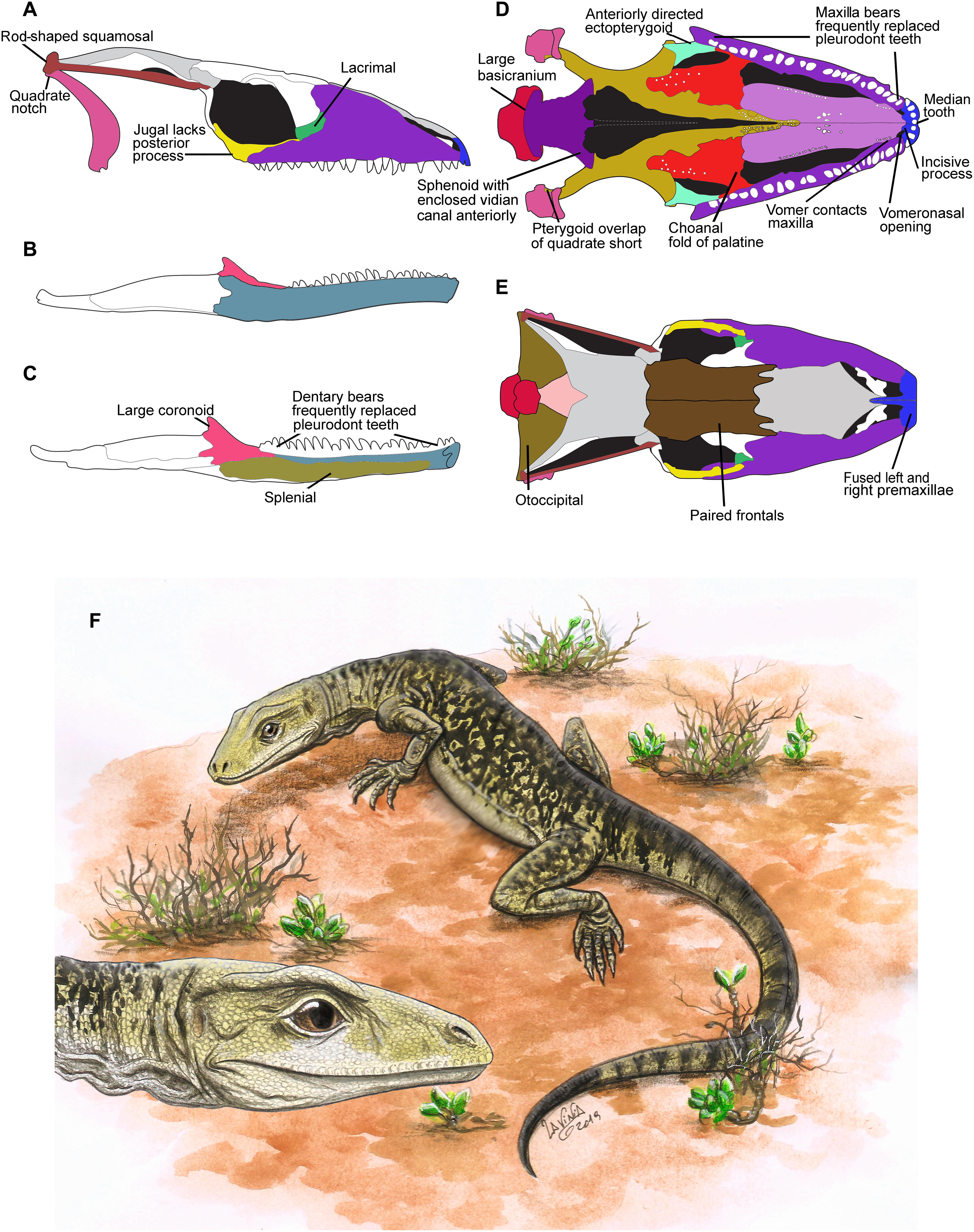
- Reconstruction of skull (top) and life restoration (bottom) as a squamate

Scientific classification
- Kingdom: Animalia
- Phylum: Chordata
- Class: Reptilia
- Genus: †Cryptovaranoides; Whiteside, Chambi-Trowell & Benton, 2022
- Species: †C. microlanius

Binomial name
- †Cryptovaranoides microlanius Whiteside, Chambi-Trowell & Benton, 2022

= Cryptovaranoides =

Cryptovaranoides Temporal range: 202 Ma Late Triassic (Rhaetian)

Extinct genus of reptiles

Cryptovaranoides ("hidden lizard-like animal") is an extinct genus of reptile from the Late Triassic Magnesian Conglomerate of England. It contains a single species, Cryptovaranoides microlanius.

== Discovery and naming ==
It is represented by a holotype partial skeleton as well as referred isolated bones from Rhaetian-aged fissure fill-deposits in Slickstones Quarry, near Tortworth, Gloucestershire preserved alongside the common fossil rhynchocephalian Clevosaurus. The type specimen had been collected in 1953, but was only described as a distinct taxon by David I. Whiteside and colleagues in 2022.

== Classification ==
When first described, Cryptovaranoides was interpreted as a crown group squamate belonging to the clade Anguimorpha, based on features of the skull architecture, braincase, dentition and postcranium. Since fossils of crown-squamates otherwise are known only from the Middle Jurassic onwards, Cryptovaranoides would push back the estimated origin of modern squamates by 35 million years, implying that the radiation of modern squamate lineages occurred much earlier than previously assumed. A 2023 study by Chase Brownstein and colleagues reanalysed the type material, and rejected the hypothesis that Cryptovaranoides was a crown-squamate. In their unconstrained phylogenetic analysis, Cryptovaranoides was instead placed within Archosauromorpha as a relative of Allokotosauria. Even when Cryptovaranoides was constrained as a member of Squamata, it was recovered well outside the crown group. However, the original describers of Cryptovaranoides maintained their original conclusion that this taxon represents a squamate. The results of this paper were contested by Michael Caldwell and colleagues in 2025, who noted methodological errors in the previous paper and concluded that Cryptovaranoides can not be regarded as a squamate. The researchers reinforced previous work identifying similarities to non-squamate neodiapsid reptiles, especially archosauromorphs such as Prolacerta, Macronemus, and Malerisaurus. In 2026, Susan E. Evans suggested that either interpretation remains inconclusive, and that synchrotron scans of the holotype with higher resolution are necessary to resolve its classification.
