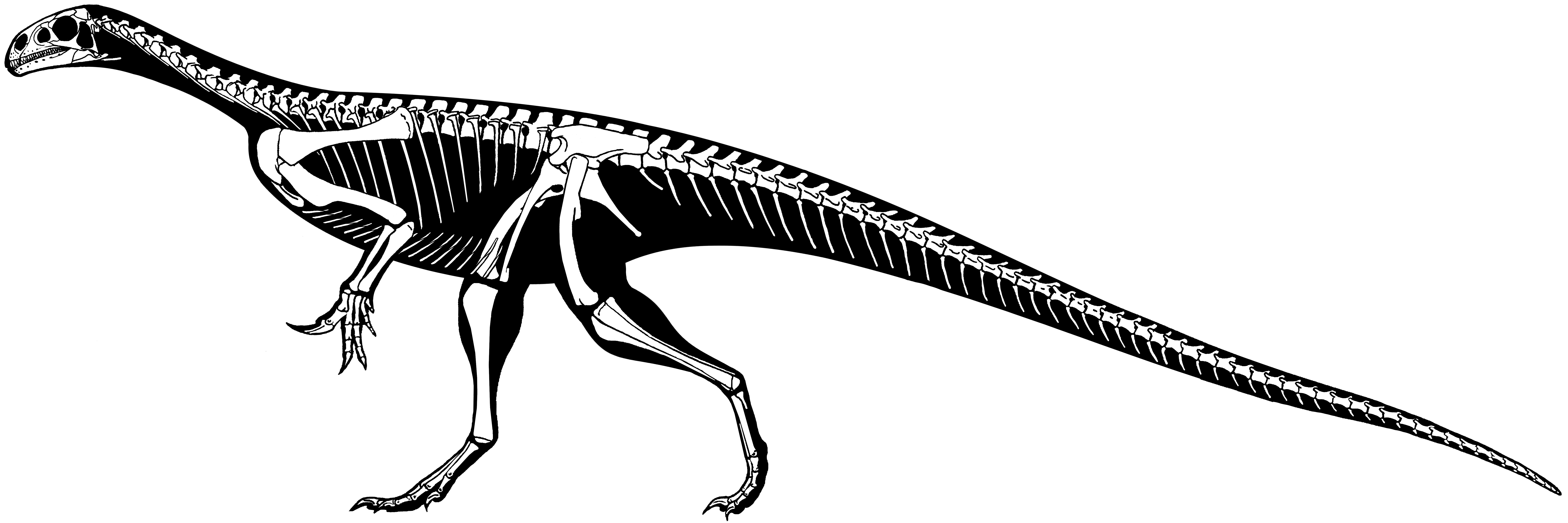
- Skeletal restoration of Thecodontosaurus antiquus

Scientific classification
- Kingdom: Animalia
- Phylum: Chordata
- Class: Reptilia
- Clade: Dinosauria
- Clade: Saurischia
- Clade: †Sauropodomorpha
- Clade: †Bagualosauria
- Family: †Thecodontosauridae; Lydekker, 1890

Type species
- †Thecodontosaurus antiquus Morris, 1843

Genera
- †Agrosaurus; †Thecodontosaurus

= Thecodontosauridae =

Thecodontosaurids Temporal range: Late Triassic, ~234 Ma

Extinct family of dinosaurs

Thecodontosauridae is a family of basal sauropodomorph dinosaurs that are part of the Bagualosauria, known from fossil remains found exclusively in the Magnesian Conglomerate of Bristol, England, which has been traditionally considered to date back to the Rhaetian stage of the Late Triassic. However, other studies have challenged this and suggested a much older date extending back to the Carnian (Other publications have suggested alternative dates ranging from the Norian stage of the Late Triassic to as young as the Hettangian stage of the Early Jurassic). Two genera are known: Agrosaurus and Thecodontosaurus; the former is often considered to be the same animal as the latter.
