= Macronemus rufescens =

Scientific classification
- Domain: Eukaryota
- Kingdom: Animalia
- Phylum: Arthropoda
- Class: Insecta
- Order: Coleoptera
- Suborder: Polyphaga
- Infraorder: Cucujiformia
- Family: Cerambycidae
- Genus: Macronemus
- Species: M. rufescens

Binomial name
- Macronemus rufescens (Bates, 1862)

Species of beetle

Macronemus rufescens is a species of beetle in the family Cerambycidae. It was described by Bates in 1862.
