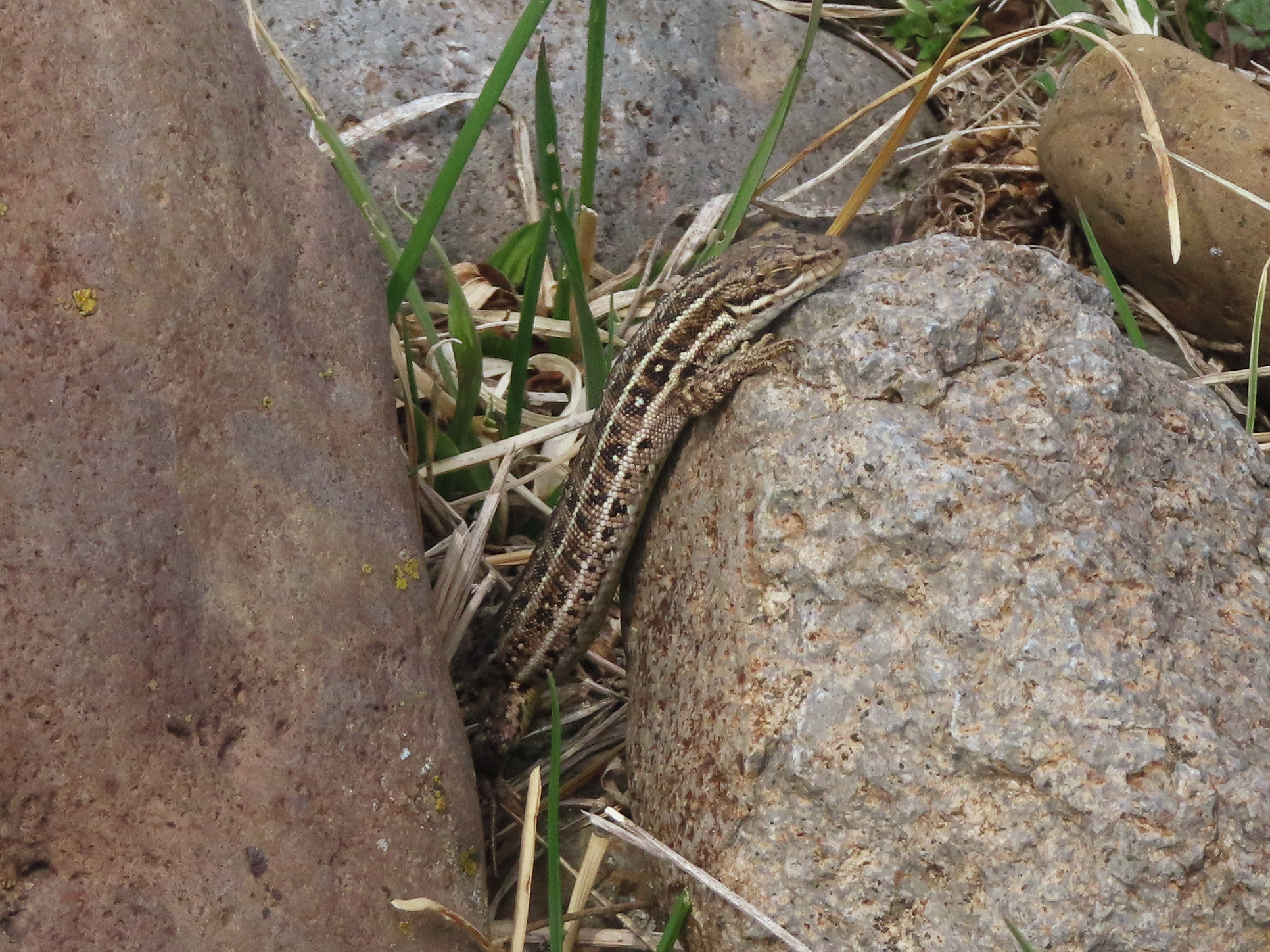

Conservation status
- Least Concern (IUCN 3.1)

Scientific classification
- Kingdom: Animalia
- Phylum: Chordata
- Class: Reptilia
- Order: Squamata
- Family: Lacertidae
- Genus: Parvilacerta
- Species: P. parva

Binomial name
- Parvilacerta parva (Boulenger, 1887)

= Dwarf lizard =

Species of lizard

The dwarf lizard (Parvilacerta parva) is a species of small lizard in the family Lacertidae. It is endemic to Anatolia and the south Caucasus. In Armenia, where it is present only as thirty-one isolated populations, the species is critically endangered.
