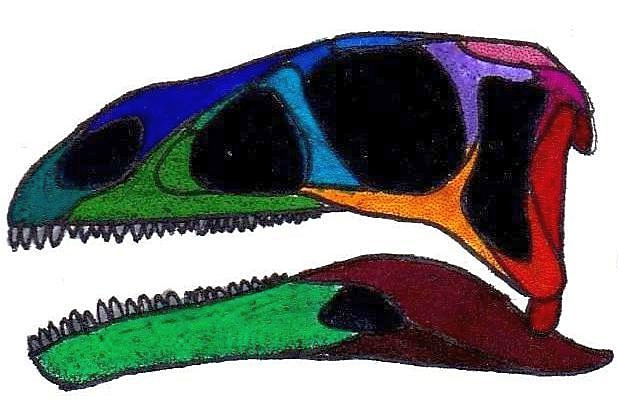
- Reconstructed skull

Scientific classification
- Kingdom: Animalia
- Phylum: Chordata
- Class: Reptilia
- Clade: Dinosauria
- Clade: Saurischia
- Clade: †Sauropodomorpha
- Clade: †Bagualosauria
- Genus: †Efraasia; Galton, 1973

Type species
- †Efraasia minor (von Huene, 1907–1908 [originally Teratosaurus minor])

Synonyms
- Teratosaurus minor von Huene, 1907-1908; Thecodontosaurus diagnosticus Fraas, 1912

= Efraasia =

Efraasia Temporal range: Late Triassic (Norian), ~210 Ma

Extinct genus of dinosaurs

Efraasia (pronounced "E-FRAHS-ee-A") is a genus of basal sauropodomorph dinosaur. It was a herbivore which lived during the middle Norian stage of the Late Triassic, around 210 million years ago, in what is now Germany. It was named in 1973 after Eberhard Fraas, who during the early twentieth century collected what were the original type specimens. The specimens were at first assigned to three already existing genera and so became divided among three separate species: Teratosaurus minor, Sellosaurus fraasi and Paleosaurus diagnosticus. In 2003, these were combined into a single valid species: Efraasia minor. Efraasia was a lightly built, medium-sized sauropodomorph, about 6 to 7 metres (20 to 23 ft) long.

== Discovery and naming ==
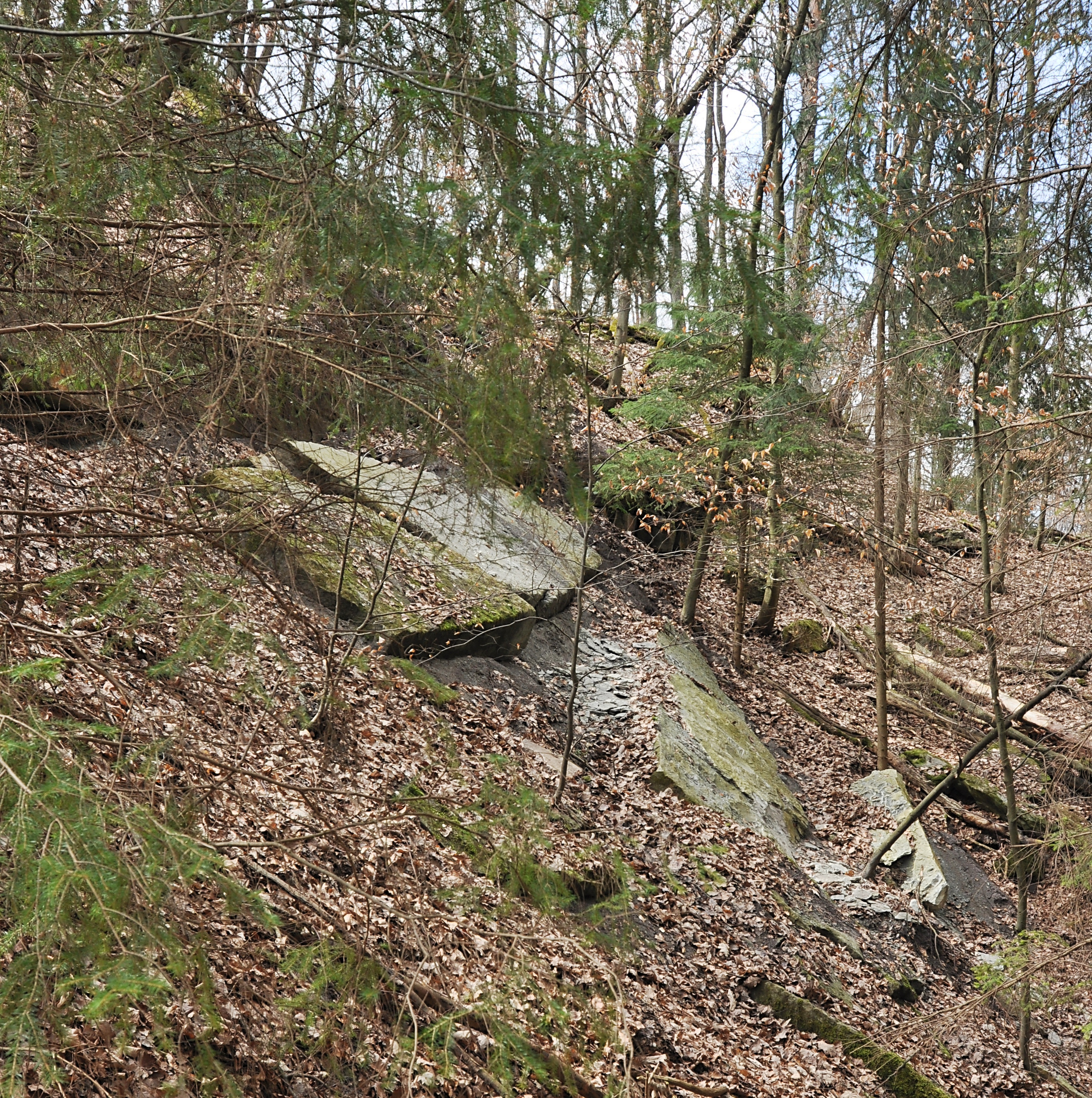
The Weiße Steinbruch site

Efraasia has had a complicated taxonomic history involving several genera and species. Material now known under Efraasia first came to light after Albert Burrer, Hofsteinmetzmeister ("Court master stonemason") at Maulbronn, in 1902 began to exploit the Weiße Steinbruch, a quarry near Pfaffenhofen in Württemberg. To reach the layer of hard white sandstone Burrer wanted to use for his building projects a 6 metres (20 ft) thick overburden of softer marl had to be removed. Many vertebrate fossils proved to be present in it. This stratum was part of the Stubensandstein Member of the lower Löwenstein Formation, dating to the Norian. From 1906 until 1914 when the quarry closed, Burrer donated the finds to paleontologist Professor Fraas of the königliche Stuttgarter Naturalienkabinett.

A specimen of a basal sauropodomorph, SMNS 11838, was first described by Friedrich von Huene in 1907–1908 and named as a new species of Teratosaurus: T. minor. At the time, Teratosaurus was thought to be a theropod dinosaur; it was only established as a rauisuchian non-dinosaur in the 1980s. The specific name referred to the fact that the specimen was smaller than Teratosaurus suevicus. The fossils consisted of a few vertebrae from the hip, the right hindlimb, and a pubic bone. Elsewhere in the same publication he gave the name Sellosaurus fraasi to a partial skeleton, SMNS 12188-12192, from slightly older rocks of the same formation, as a second species of his new genus Sellosaurus (the genus is today considered to be a synonym of Plateosaurus).

In 1912, Eberhard Fraas reported on two partial skeletons, SMNS 12667 and SMNS 12684 collected in 1909, which he assigned to a new species of Thecodontosaurus: T. diagnosticus. He would never describe them due to his failing health, and thus this name remained a nomen nudum. Von Huene adopted the specific name years later, after Fraas' death, redescribing Fraas' specimens as Paleosaurus (?) diagnosticus in 1932. The question mark indicates that von Huene considered the reference as provisional only. In 1959 Oskar Kuhn pointed out that the name Paleosaurus Riley & Stutchbury 1836 was preoccupied and renamed the genus Palaeosauriscus. Allen Charig in 1967 was the first to use the combination Palaeosauriscus diagnosticus for the German material. However, the new generic name was itself a junior homonym of Palaeosauriscus fraserianus Cope 1878.

Peter Galton reassigned Fraas' specimens to the new genus Efraasia in 1973, because Palaeosaurus, apart from the homonymy problems, was a nondiagnostic tooth genus. The generic name was a contraction of "E. Fraas". The new species name combination thus became Efraasia diagnostica. However, Galton and Robert Bakker later (1985) recommended that Efraasia be considered a junior synonym of another prosauropod, Sellosaurus gracilis.

In 2003, Adam Yates published a study incorporating these and other fossils from the Late Triassic of Germany. He found that the "Sellosaurus" material fell into two clusters. One included the original Sellosaurus gracilis, which he assigned to Plateosaurus as P. gracilis. The other included "Teratosaurus" minor, "Sellosaurus" fraasi, and "Palaeosaurus" diagnosticus. Efraasia was the oldest valid generic name for these fossils. The specific name could not be determined as simply, as both Teratosaurus minor and Sellosaurus fraasi had first appeared in von Huene's 1908 book. Because the former name had page priority, Yates chose minor as the specific name, providing for the type species Teratosaurus minor the new combination Efraasia minor, which is thus the single valid species name of the taxon. Yates did not take into account two other species based by von Huene on very fragmentary German basal sauropodomorph material, Teratosaurus trossingensis and Thecodontosaurus hermannianus, though Galton had considered them junior synonyms of Efraasia diagnostica in 1990.

Apart from the specimens mentioned above, mostly consisting of rather complete skeletons preserved in large slabs, though not fully prepared from the rock matrix, several other fossils have been found. Together they allow for a good impression of what the animal looked like.

== Description ==
Size comparison

Efraasia was once thought to be a relatively small dinosaur, about 2 to 3 metres (6.6 to 9.8 ft) long, but this was because the most complete known fossils are from juvenile animals. Yates in 2003 has estimated the adult length at 6.5 metres (21 ft); the largest specimen is SMNS 12843 with a femur length of 627 millimetres (24.7 in). Efraasia was lightly built for its size, with gracile hands and feet. Like many "primitive" sauropodomorphs, Efraasia might have been partially bipedal and partly quadrupedal. It had long fingers and mobile thumbs, with which it would have been able to grasp food, but the shape of its wrists might have allowed it to walk easily on all fours. Some researchers however, contend that the lower arm did not allow pronation, a rotation of the radius around the ulna, so that the hand could not be directed downward, making the animal an obligate biped.

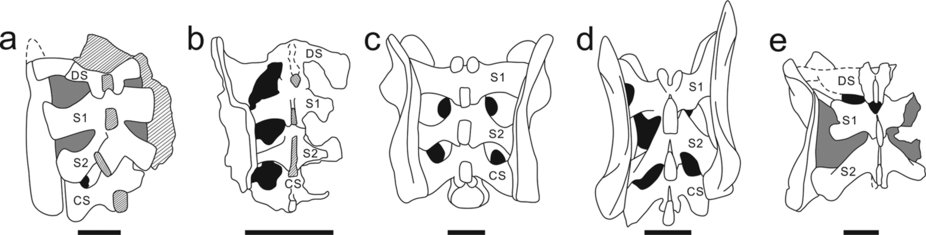
Sacral vertebrae (e) compared to those of other basal sauropodomorphs

The skull is small, pointed and triangular. There are four teeth in the premaxilla. The neck is only moderately elongated but thin. The neural spines of the tail are low. The second finger is longer than the third finger. The first toe is not strongly reduced. Von Huene identified a cluster of stomach stones (gastroliths) in association to specimen SMNS 12667.

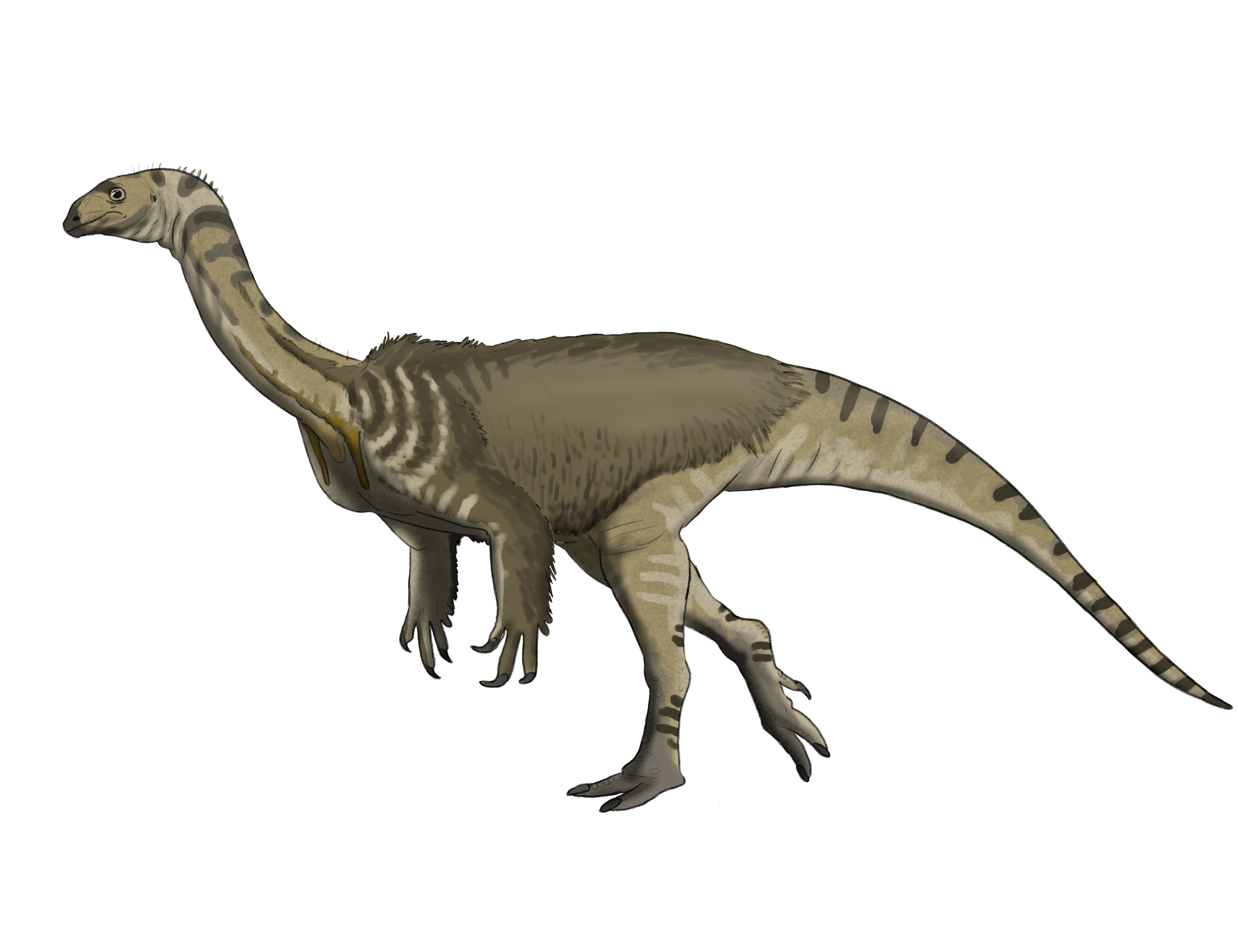
Life restoration

Yates identifies two unique derived traits (autapomorphies): the presence of a raised crescent-like ridge on the upper part of the inner side of the pubis shaft; and the presence of a vaulted bony web between two lower extensions of a braincase bone, the processus basipterygoidei, with a raised central bony platform on top of the vault.

== Classification ==
Von Huene continued interpreting these forms as predatory dinosaurs, in 1932 assigning them to a separate family, Palaeosauridae, as part of the Carnosauria. Only in 1965, Charig established they were plant-eating sauropodomorphs.

In 1973, Galton assigned Efraasia to the Anchisauridae, but he used this name as a paraphyletic group encompassing all "prosauropods" that were not melanorosaurids. Modern phylogenetic analysis has indicated that Efraasia is a basal sauropodomorph, somewhat more derived than Thecodontosaurus, but less than either the Prosauropoda (including Plateosaurus) or the Sauropoda. The genus is sometimes recovered as the sister taxon to the last common ancestor of both larger groups.
