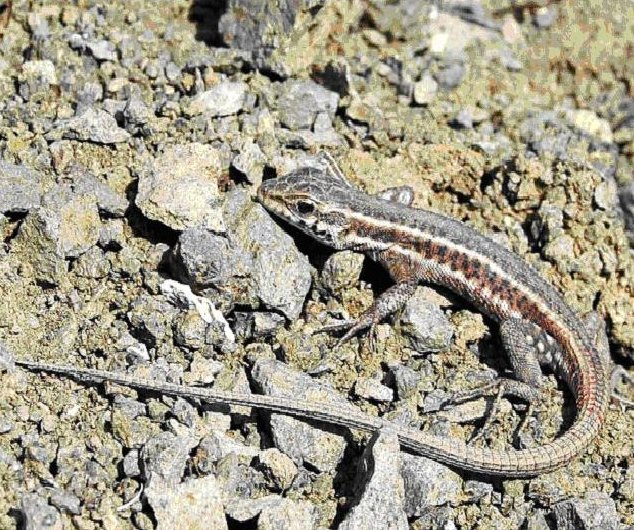

Scientific classification
- Kingdom: Animalia
- Phylum: Chordata
- Class: Reptilia
- Order: Squamata
- Family: Lacertidae
- Subfamily: Lacertinae
- Genus: Parvilacerta; Harris, Arnold, & Thomas, 1998

Species
- See text

= Parvilacerta =

Genus of lizards

Parvilacerta is a genus of wall lizards of the family Lacertidae.

== Species ==
- Parvilacerta fraasii (Lehrs, 1910) — Fraas's lizard
- Parvilacerta parva (Boulenger, 1887) — dwarf lizard
