= Cromhall Quarry =

Quarry in Gloucestershire

Coordinates: 51.62244°N 2.42897°W

Slickstones Quarry, Cromhall
- Site of Special Scientific Interest
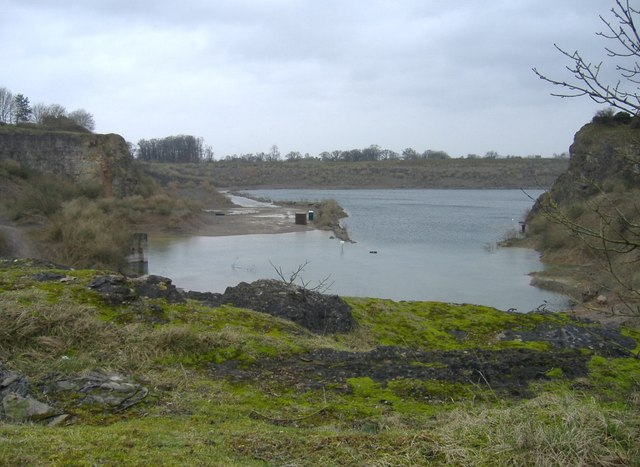
- Location of Slickstones Quarry, Cromhall.
- Area of search: Avon
- Grid reference: ST704916
- Interest: Geological
- Area: 2.7 ha (6.7 acres)
- Notification date: 1966
- Location map: English Nature

Cromhall Quarry, also known as Slickstones Quarry, (grid reference ST704916) is a 2.7 hectare flooded former limestone quarry near the village of Cromhall, South Gloucestershire, England notified in 1966.

The quarry is a designated Site of Special Scientific Interest (SSSI) due to its geological and biological significance, which includes the presence of the protected Great Crested Newt (Triturus cristatus). In recent years, the quarry has transitioned into a training facility operated by South West Maritime Academy, while also offering open water swimming, scuba diving, and paddleboarding through The Lake.

The site shows red Triassic rocks from the Magnesian Conglomerate in fissures of older carboniferous limestone from the Friars Point Limestone.

The fossils of two Clevosaurus species, Cryptovaranoides microlanius and Hwiccewyrm trispiculum have been recovered from Slickstones Quarry in 1939 and 1988, 1953, and the 1970s respectively.

== History ==
=== Early Operations ===
Quarrying at Cromhall began in 1840, focusing on the extraction of quartzitic sandstone known as the Upper Cromhall Sandstone. This brightly coloured red to yellow sandstone provided a valuable resource for construction and other purposes.

=== Geological Significance ===
The quarry faces expose a variety of geological formations, including sandstones, mudstones, and limestones, showcasing a history of diverse environments from open shelf seas to deltaic conditions.The site is also notable for its rich fossil record, with over thirty different species identified, including reptiles, dinosaurs, and mammals dating back to the Triassic Period (approximately 210 million years ago).

Some of the notable fossil finds include Kuehneosaurus, a gliding reptile; a Theropod dinosaur; and Agnosphitys cromhallensis, a carnivorous dinosaur named after the village itself. The presence of these fossils and the diverse geological formations contribute to the quarry's SSSI status and highlight its importance for scientific research and education.

Cromhall Quarry also plays a role in conservation, serving as a habitat for the protected Great Crested Newt.

=== Closure and Transition ===
Cromhall Quarry ceased operations as a quarry in 1998. The quarry naturally flooded, creating a lake with a maximum depth of 17 meters. In 2006, Cromhall Dive Centre began operations, offering scuba diving facilities and training. The quarry was run by Simon Chen and Maggie Alger for 14 years however, the site faced challenges in 2020 due to severe storms, including Ciara, Dennis, and Jorge, and the COVID-19 pandemic, leading to its closure.

In July 2020, South West Maritime Academy took over the management of Cromhall Quarry. The academy, which had previously used the site for training, expanded its operations to include the quarry lake and surrounding area. This marked a significant transition for the quarry, establishing it as a hub for maritime training and leisure activities.

== Maritime Training Facility ==
Cromhall Quarry provides a versatile environment for maritime training by South West Maritime Academy. The flooded quarry, which covers approximately 10 acres, offers opportunities for in-water training exercises, such as survival techniques and rescue scenarios. The surrounding land allows for the simulation of various maritime environments and scenarios, including fire training and medical emergencies. The academy also utilizes the quarry for specialized diving sessions and open water courses. South West Maritime Academy also has training locations in Portishead Marina and Palma de Mallorca.

== The Lake ==
The Lake at Cromhall Quarry is a popular destination for open water swimming, scuba diving, and paddleboarding. The Lake's limestone-filtered water provides high visibility, making it ideal for underwater exploration and aquatic activities.

=== Open Water Swimming ===
The Lake provides a marked course for open water swimming, with sessions available throughout the week. Open water swimming classes are available for those new to open water swimming or those wanting to improve their skills. The Lake also offers the opportunity for night-time swims.

=== Scuba Diving ===
The Lake is a popular dive site, with a maximum depth of 18 meters, although this can change slightly with the seasons. It features various underwater attractions, including submerged objects and platforms. Divers can explore the underwater world and develop their diving skills in a safe and controlled environment. There are also underwater wreckages for divers to explore. The Lake can be accessed by divers via a sloping entry (a former road) and a pontoon, which is also used as an entry point for swimmers.
