= Fraas's lizard =

Conservation status
- Endangered (IUCN 3.1)

Scientific classification
- Kingdom: Animalia
- Phylum: Chordata
- Class: Reptilia
- Order: Squamata
- Family: Lacertidae
- Genus: Parvilacerta
- Species: P. fraasii

Binomial name
- Parvilacerta fraasii (Lehrs, 1910)

Synonyms
- Lacerta fraasii Lehrs, 1910; Lacerta (Parvilacerta) fraasii — Harris et al., 1998; Parvilacerta fraasii — Bischoff, 2005

Species of lizard

Fraas's lizard (Parvilacerta fraasii) is a species of lizard in the family Lacertidae. The species is native to Lebanon.

== Etymology ==
The specific name, fraasii, is in honor of German paleontologist Eberhard Fraas.

== Geographic range ==
P. fraasii is found in Lebanon and possibly Syria.

== Habitat ==
The natural habitat of P. fraasii is rocky areas, at altitudes of 1,800–2,400 m (5,900–7,900 ft).

== Reproduction ==
P. fraasii is oviparous. Clutch size is three or four eggs.

== Conservation status ==
P. fraasii is threatened by habitat loss.
