= Macronemus antennator =

Scientific classification
- Kingdom: Animalia
- Phylum: Arthropoda
- Class: Insecta
- Order: Coleoptera
- Suborder: Polyphaga
- Infraorder: Cucujiformia
- Family: Cerambycidae
- Genus: Macronemus
- Species: M. antennator

Binomial name
- Macronemus antennator (Fabricius, 1801)

Species of beetle

Macronemus antennator is a species of beetle in the family Cerambycidae. It was described by Johan Christian Fabricius in 1801.
