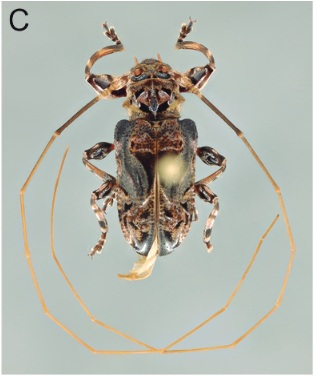

Scientific classification
- Kingdom: Animalia
- Phylum: Arthropoda
- Clade: Pancrustacea
- Class: Insecta
- Order: Coleoptera
- Suborder: Polyphaga
- Infraorder: Cucujiformia
- Family: Cerambycidae
- Genus: Macronemus
- Species: M. filicornis

Binomial name
- Macronemus filicornis (Thomson, 1860)

Synonyms
- Aethomerus filicornis Thomson, 1861; Aethomerus cretatus Pascoe, 1866

= Macronemus filicornis =

Species of beetle

Macronemus filicornis is a species of beetle in the family Cerambycidae. It was described by Thomson in 1860. It is found in Brazil (Minas Gerais, Espirito Santo, Rio de Janeiro, São Paulo, Paraná, Santa Catarina, Rio Grande do Sul), Paraguay and Argentina.
