= Gres a Avicula contorta =

- Stratigraphic range: Late Norian
- Type: Geological formation

Location
- Country: France

The Gres a Avicula contorta is a geological formation in France. It dates back to the late Norian.

== Vertebrate paleofauna ==
- Rhomphaiodon nicolensis (type locality)

Dinosaurs of the Gres a Avicula contorta
| Taxa | Presence | Notes | Images |
|---|---|---|---|
| Plateosauria | Indeterminate | | |
| Theropoda | Indeterminate remains. | | |

== See also ==
- List of dinosaur-bearing rock formations
