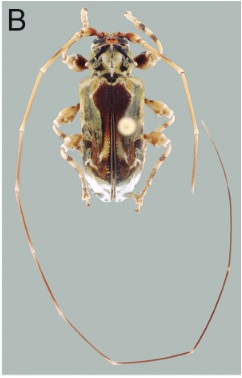

Scientific classification
- Kingdom: Animalia
- Phylum: Arthropoda
- Clade: Pancrustacea
- Class: Insecta
- Order: Coleoptera
- Suborder: Polyphaga
- Infraorder: Cucujiformia
- Family: Cerambycidae
- Genus: Macronemus
- Species: M. analis

Binomial name
- Macronemus analis (Pascoe, 1866)

Synonyms
- Aethomerus analis Pascoe, 1866

= Macronemus analis =

Species of beetle

Macronemus analis is a species of beetle in the family Cerambycidae. It was described by Pascoe in 1866. It is found in Brazil (São Paulo, Espirito Santo, Rio de Janeiro).
