= Macronemus =

Scientific classification
- Domain: Eukaryota
- Kingdom: Animalia
- Phylum: Arthropoda
- Class: Insecta
- Order: Coleoptera
- Suborder: Polyphaga
- Infraorder: Cucujiformia
- Family: Cerambycidae
- Tribe: Acanthoderini
- Genus: Macronemus

Genus of beetles

Macronemus is a genus of beetles in the family Cerambycidae, containing the following species:

- Macronemus analis (Pascoe, 1866)
- Macronemus antennator (Fabricius, 1801)
- Macronemus asperulus White, 1855
- Macronemus filicornis (Thomson, 1860)
- Macronemus rufescens (Bates, 1862)
- Macronemus verrucosus (Pascoe, 1866)
