= Eberhard Fraas =

German scientist, geologist and paleontologist

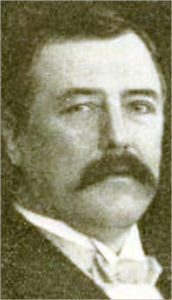
Eberhard Fraas in 1915 by Ernst Stromer

Eberhard Fraas (26 June 1862 – 6 March 1915) was a German scientist, geologist and paleontologist. He worked as a curator at the Stuttgarter Naturaliensammlung and discovered the dinosaurs of the Tendaguru formation in then German East Africa (now Tanzania). The dinosaur Efraasia is named after him.

== Life ==
Eberhard Fraas was born in Stuttgart, Kingdom of Württemberg, the son of Oscar Fraas (1824–1897), a curator and professor at the geological and paleontological department of the Württemberg Royal Natural Cabinet. After attending the Gymnasium, he studied at Leipzig University with Hermann Credner and Ferdinand Zirkel, and later at the Ludwig-Maximilians-Universität München under Karl Alfred von Zittel, August Rothpletz (1853−1918) and Paul Groth. Here, he received his Ph.D. in 1886 with a dissertation about Jurassic starfish. His geological work enabled him to publish the first coherent account about the history of the Alps.

In July 1888, he received his Habilitation (second Ph.D.) from the Ludwig-Maximilians-Universität München, and in 1891 became an assistant at the State Museum of Natural History Stuttgart. In 1894, he became curator of its geological, paleontological and mineralogical departments. In that capacity, he was responsible for a multitude of geological maps of his native Swabia. Many of these were published in co-operation with Wilhelm Branco (who would later change his name to Wilhelm von Branca). Fraas was also curator of Friedrich Alfred Krupp's mineral collections, and taught him from 1898 to his death in 1902.

Trips to Spain, Sardinia, Italy, the Balkans, the west of North America (1901), Egypt and Syria (1897 and 1906) and finally to German East Africa (1907) broadened his view and filled the museum with new acquisitions.

His discovery of dinosaurs in East Africa would spawn many expeditions to the Tendaguru, first by the Berlin Museum für Naturkunde, and by British institutions once the Germans had lost control of the colony after World War I.

Fraas died unexpectedly on 6 March 1915 in Stuttgart from dysentery which he had caught while in East Africa.

== Legacy ==
Fraas is commemorated in the scientific name of a species of West Asian lizard, Parvilacerta fraasii.

== Works ==
- Die Asterien des Weissen Jura von Schwaben und Franken : Mit Untersuchungen über die Structur der Echinodermen und das Kalkgerüst der Asterien. Palaeontographica 32: 229 – 261, Stuttgart : E. Schweizerbart (Koch), 1886
- Die Labyrinthodonten der schwäbischen Trias. Palaeontographica 36: 1-158, Stuttgart: E. Schweizerbart (Koch), 1889
- Scenerie der Alpen. 325 S., Leipzig: Weigel, 1892
- Die Triaszeit in Schwaben; Ein Blick in die Urgeschichte an der Hand von R. Blezingers geologischer Pyramide. 40 S., Ravensburg: O. Maier, 1900
- Die Meer-Crocodilier (Thalattosuchia) des oberen Jura unter specieller Berücksichtigung von Dacosaurus und Geosaurus. Palaeontographica 49 (1): 1-71, Stuttgart: E. Schweizerbart, 1902
- Führer durch das Königliche Naturalien-Kabinett zu Stuttgart Teil 1: Die geognostische Sammlung Württembergs im Parterre-Saal, zugleich ein Leitfaden für die geologischen Verhältnisse und die vorweltlichen Bewohner unseres Landes. 82 S., Stuttgart: E. Schweizerbart, 1903
- Neue Zeuglodonten aus dem unteren Mitteleocän vom Mokattam bei Cairo. Geologische und Palaeontologische Abhandlungen, N.F. 6 (3): 1-24, Jena: Fischer, 1904
- Der Petrefaktensammler: ein Leitfaden zum Sammeln und Bestimmen der Versteinerungen Deutschlands. 249, 72 S., Stuttgart: K. G. Lutz, 1910
- Branca, W., Fraas, E.: Das vulcanische Ries bei Nördlingen in seiner Bedeutung für Fragen der allgemeinen Geologie. Abhandlungen der Königlich Preussischen Akademie der Wissenschaften zu Berlin: 1-169 S., 1901
- Branca, W., Fraas, E.: Das kryptovulcanische Becken von Steinheim. Abhandlungen der Königlich Preussischen Akademie der Wissenschaften zu Berlin: 1-64, 1905
- Proteroehersis, eine pleurodire Schildkröte aus dem Keuper. Jahreshefte des Vereins für Vaterländische Naturkunde in Württemberg, 69, S. 13-90. Online verfügbar. Universität Frankfurt.

== Literature ==
- Werner Quenstedt (1961). "Fraas, Eberhard". Neue Deutsche Biographie (in German). Vol. 5. Berlin: Duncker & Humblot. pp. 307–308.
- Stromer, Ernst Freiherr von Reichenbach: Eberhard Fraas. In: Centralblatt für Mineralogie, Geologie und Paläontologie 15 (1915) 12, S. 353-359 (in German)
- Walther, J.: Eberhard Fraas. Verhandlungen der Gesellschaft Deutscher Naturforscher und Ärzte. 87: 334-336, Leipzig : Vogel, 1922 (in German)
