= Rhomphaiodon =

Rhomphaiodon Temporal range: Late Triassic-Early Jurassic, 215.56–175.6 Ma

Scientific classification
- Kingdom: Animalia
- Phylum: Chordata
- Class: Chondrichthyes
- Subclass: Elasmobranchii
- Order: †Synechodontiformes
- Genus: †Rhomphaiodon; Duffin, 1993

Type species
- †Rhomphaiodon minor Duffin, 1993

Species
- †R. minor Duffin, 1993 (type); †R. nicolensis Duffin, 1993

Synonyms
- Hybodus minor Agassiz, 1837

Extinct genus of cartilaginous fishes

Rhomphaiodon is an extinct genus of cartilaginous fish in the order Synechodontiformes that has been found in Late Triassic and Early Jurassic deposits located in Europe. The type species R. minor was originally named as a species of Hybodus in 1837 by Louis Agassiz. A second species, R. nicolensis, was added when the genus was named in 1993.

== Fossil distribution ==
Fossils of Rhomphaiodon have been found in:

Triassic

- Grès de Mortinsart Formation, Norian-Rhaetian Belgium (R. minor)
- Sables de Mortinsart Formation, Norian Belgium (R. minor)
- near Saint-Laurent-du-Var, Rhaetian France (R. minor)
- Gres à Avicula contorta Formation, Rhaetian France (R. nicolensis)
- Apfelstädtgrundes, Rhaetian Germany (R. minor)
- Kössener Schichten Formation (Cochloceras suessi ammonoid zone), Rhaetian Germany (R. minor)
- Steinmergel Group, Norian Luxembourg (R. minor)
- Magnesian Conglomerate, Rhaetian England (R. minor)
- Westbury Formation, Rhaetian England (R. minor)
- Microlestes Quarry, Frome, Rhaetian England (R. minor)
- Manor Farm Quarry, Gloucestershire, Rhaetian England (R. minor)
- Penarth Group, Rhaetian England (R. minor)
- Cribbs Causeway, Bristol, Rhaetian England (R. minor)
- Pullastra Sandstone, Rhaetian England (R. minor)

Jurassic

- Aubange, Fleche (Hildoceras bifrons zone), Toarcian Belgium (R. minor)
- Dudelange, Ginzebierg, Toarcian Luxembourg (R. minor)
- Windsor Hill, Buckinghamshire (Lias Group?), Pliensbachian England (R. minor)
