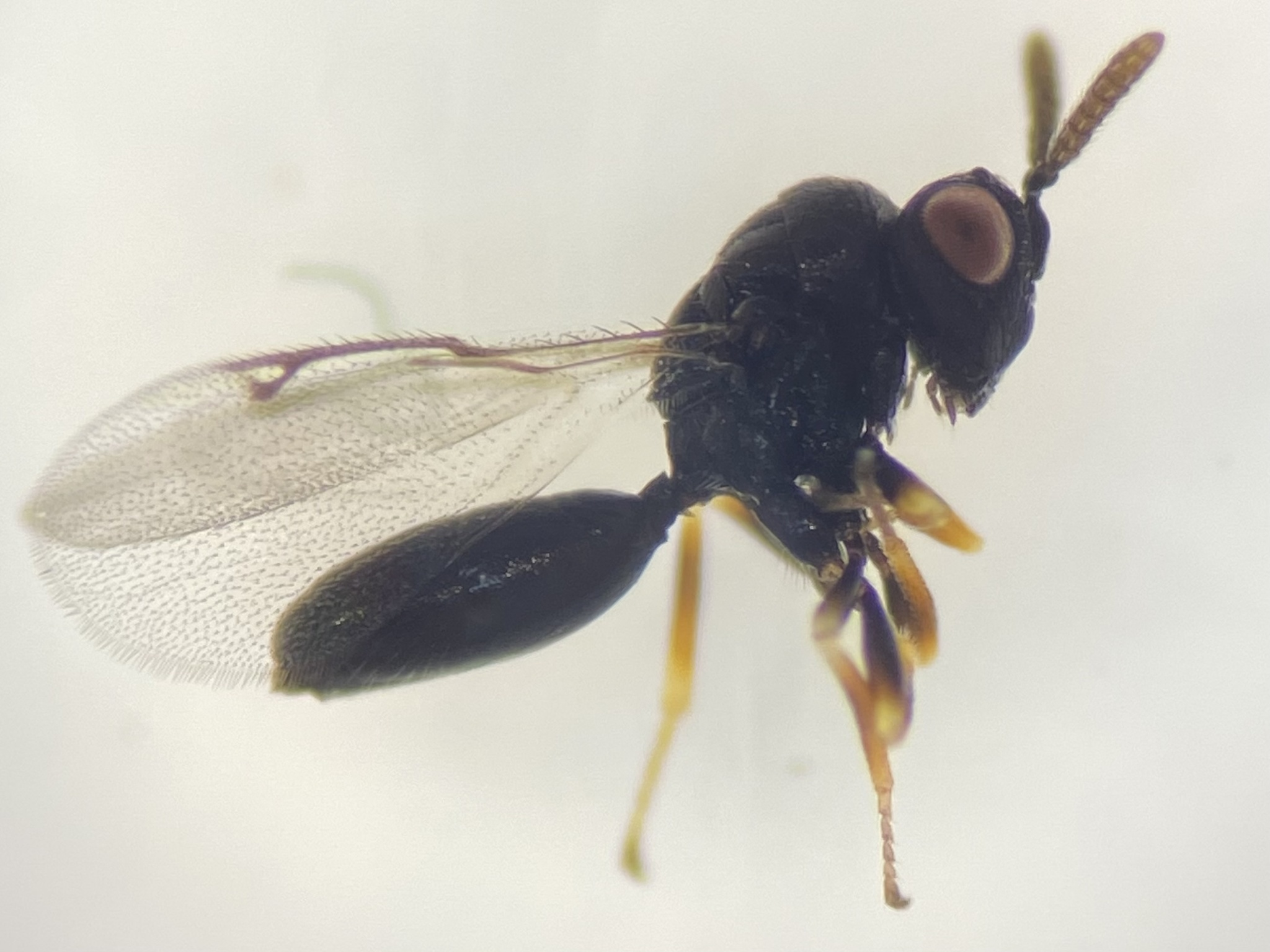

Scientific classification
- Kingdom: Animalia
- Phylum: Arthropoda
- Class: Insecta
- Order: Hymenoptera
- Family: Eurytomidae
- Subfamily: Rileyinae
- Genus: Rileya; Ashmead, 1888

Type species
- Rileya americana Girault, 1916

Synonyms
- Rileya Howard, 1888

= Rileya =

Genus of wasps

Rileya is a genus of parasitoid wasp in the family Eurytomidae. There are 27 species currently assigned to the genus.
