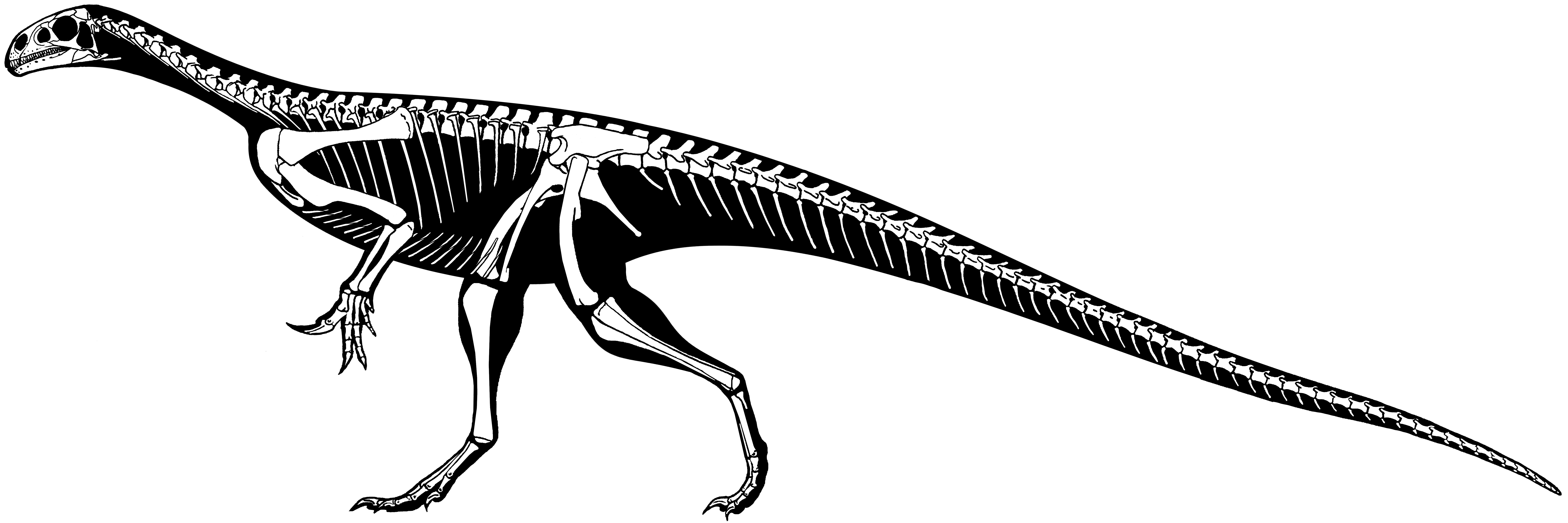
- Skeletal restoration

Scientific classification
- Kingdom: Animalia
- Phylum: Chordata
- Class: Reptilia
- Clade: Dinosauria
- Clade: Saurischia
- Clade: †Sauropodomorpha
- Family: †Thecodontosauridae
- Genus: †Thecodontosaurus; Riley & Stutchbury, 1836

Type species
- †Thecodontosaurus antiquus Morris, 1843

Synonyms
- ?Agrosaurus Seeley, 1891; ?Pantydraco Galton, Yates & Kermack, 2007

= Thecodontosaurus =

Thecodontosaurus Temporal range: Carnian ~234 Ma

Extinct genus of dinosaurs

Thecodontosaurus ("socket-tooth lizard") is a genus of herbivorous basal sauropodomorph dinosaur that lived during the late Triassic period (Carnian age). Its remains are known mostly from Triassic "fissure fillings" in southern England. Thecodontosaurus was a small bipedal animal, about 2 m (6.6 ft) long. It is one of the first dinosaurs to be discovered and is one of the oldest that ever existed. Many species have been named within the genus, but only the type species Thecodontosaurus antiquus is seen as valid today.

== Discovery and naming ==
=== Thecodontosaurus antiquus ===
Size comparison

In the autumn of 1834, surgeon Henry Riley (1797–1848) and the curator of the Bristol Institution, Samuel Stutchbury, began to excavate "saurian remains" at the quarry of Durdham Down, at Clifton, presently a part of Bristol, which is part of the Magnesian Conglomerate. In 1834 and 1835, they briefly reported on the finds. They provided their initial description in 1836, naming a new genus: Thecodontosaurus. The name is derived from Greek θήκή, thēkē, "socket", and οδους, odous, "tooth", a reference to the fact that the roots of the teeth were not fused with the jaw bone, as in present lizards, but positioned in separate tooth sockets. Thecodontosaurus was the fifth dinosaur named, after Megalosaurus, Iguanodon, Streptospondylus and Hylaeosaurus, though Riley and Stutchbury were not aware of this, the very concept of Dinosauria only being created in 1842. In 1843, in his catalogue of British fossils, John Morris provided a complete species name: Thecodontosaurus antiquus. The specific epithet, "antiquus", means "ancient" in Latin.

Forelimb bones

The original type specimen or holotype of Thecodontosaurus, BCM 1, a lower jaw, fell victim to heavy World War II bombings. Many remains of this dinosaur and other material related to it were destroyed in November 1940 during the Bristol Blitz. However, most bones were salvaged: today 184 fossil bones are part of the collection of the Bristol City Museum and Art Gallery. Later, more remains were found near Bristol at Tytherington. Currently about 245 fragmentary specimens are known, representing numerous individuals. In 1985, Peter Galton designated another lower jaw, a right dentary, as the neotype, BCM 2. The remains were found in a breccia pocket resting on Carboniferous Limestone, probably the eroded remnants of a Triassic cave. There is no definitive evidence for the age of the deposits from which the original material came, but the geomorphological context of Thecodontosaurus remains from Tytherington indicates that they are of late Carnian age.

=== Other species ===
Apart from the original type species, Thecodontosaurus antiquus, Riley and Stutchbury also found some teeth of carnivorous phytosaurians that they named Palaeosaurus cylindrodon and P. platyodon. In the late nineteenth century, the theory became popular that such remains belonged to carnivorous prosauropods: animals with the body of Thecodontosaurus, but with slicing teeth. In 1890, Arthur Smith Woodward accordingly named a Thecodontosaurus platyodon, and in 1908 Friedrich von Huene named a Thecodontosaurus cylindrodon. Though still defended by Michael Cooper in 1981, the hypothesis that such creatures existed has now been totally discredited.

On one occasion, material of Thecodontosaurus was, by mistake, described as a separate genus. In 1891, Harry Govier Seeley named Agrosaurus macgillivrayi, assuming the remains had been collected in 1844 by the crew of HMS Fly on the northeast coast of Australia. It was long considered the first dinosaur found in Australia, but in 1999 it was discovered that the bones probably belonged to a lot sent by Riley and Stutchbury to the British Museum of Natural History and then mislabelled. In 1906, von Huene had already noted the close resemblance and renamed the species Thecodontosaurus macgillivrayi. It is thus a junior synonym of Thecodontosaurus antiquus.

Presently, the only valid species is thus T. antiquus.

=== Misassigned species ===
- Thecodontosaurus latespinatus von Huene, 1907-08 = Tanystropheus
- Thecodontosaurus primus von Huene, 1907-1908 = indeterminate archosauromorph, previously and questionably referred to Protanystropheus
- Thecodontosaurus elizae Sauvage, 1907
- Thecodontosaurus gibbidens Cope, 1878 = Galtonia
- Thecodontosaurus skirtopodus (Seeley, 1894) = Hortalotarsus
- Thecodontosaurus polyzelus (Hitchcock, 1865) von Huene, 1906
- Thecodontosaurus hermannianus von Huene, 1908
- Thecodontosaurus diagnosticus Fraas, 1912 = Efraasia
- Thecodontosaurus minor Haughton, 1918
- Thecodontosaurus dubius Haughton, 1924
- Thecodontosaurus browni (Seeley, 1895) von Huene, 1932
- Thecodontosaurus alophos Haughton, 1932 = Nyasasaurus

Thecodontosaurus caducus was named by Adam Yates in 2003 for a juvenile specimen found in Wales; in 2007 this was made the separate genus Pantydraco. However, Ballell, Rayfield & Benton (2020) considered Pantydraco caducus to be a taxon of uncertain validity, and considered it possible that it might represent a juvenile of Thecodontosaurus antiquus.

== Description ==
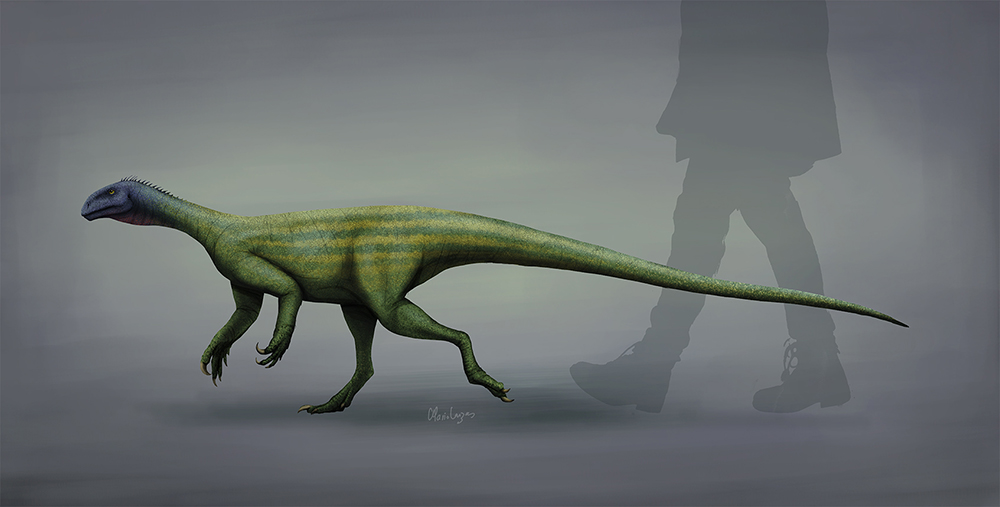
Life restoration compared to a human

From the fragmentary remains of Thecodontosaurus, most of the skeleton can be reconstructed, except for the front of the skull. Thecodontosaurus had a rather short neck supporting a fairly large skull with large eyes. Its jaws contained many small- to medium-sized, serrated, leaf-shaped teeth. This dinosaur's hands and feet each had five digits, and the hands were long and rather narrow, with an extended claw on each. This dinosaur's front limbs were much shorter than the legs, and its tail was much longer than the head, neck and body put together. On average, it was 1.2 metres (3.9 ft) long, 30 centimetres (12 in) or 1 ft. tall, and weighed 11 kilograms (24 lb). The largest individuals had an estimated length of 2.5 metres (8.2 ft).

In 2000, Michael Benton noted the existence of a robust morph in the population, seen by him as a possible second species or, more likely, an instance of sexual dimorphism. Benton also indicated some unique derived traits, or autapomorphies, for the species: a long basipterygoid process on the braincase; a dentary that is short in relation to the total length of the lower jaw; an ilium that has a back end that is subquadrate instead of rounded.

The small size has been explained as an instance of insular dwarfism.

== Classification ==
Hindlimb bones

Riley and Stutchbury originally saw Thecodontosaurus as a member of the Squamata, the group containing lizards and snakes. This did not change when Richard Owen coined the term Dinosauria in 1842, because Owen did not recognise Thecodontosaurus as a dinosaur; in 1865, he assigned it to the Thecodontia. It was not until 1870 that Thomas Huxley became the first person to understand that it was a dinosaur, though referring it incorrectly to the Scelidosauridae. Later, it was placed in either the Anchisauridae or its own Thecodontosauridae alongside Agrosaurus.

Modern exact cladistic analyses have not been conclusive. Although not actually the earliest member of the group, Thecodontosaurus is sometimes placed in a very basal position among the sauropodomorph dinosaurs. It was earlier included under the Prosauropoda, but more recently it has been suggested that Thecodontosaurus and its relatives preceded the prosauropod-sauropod split.

== Paleobiology ==
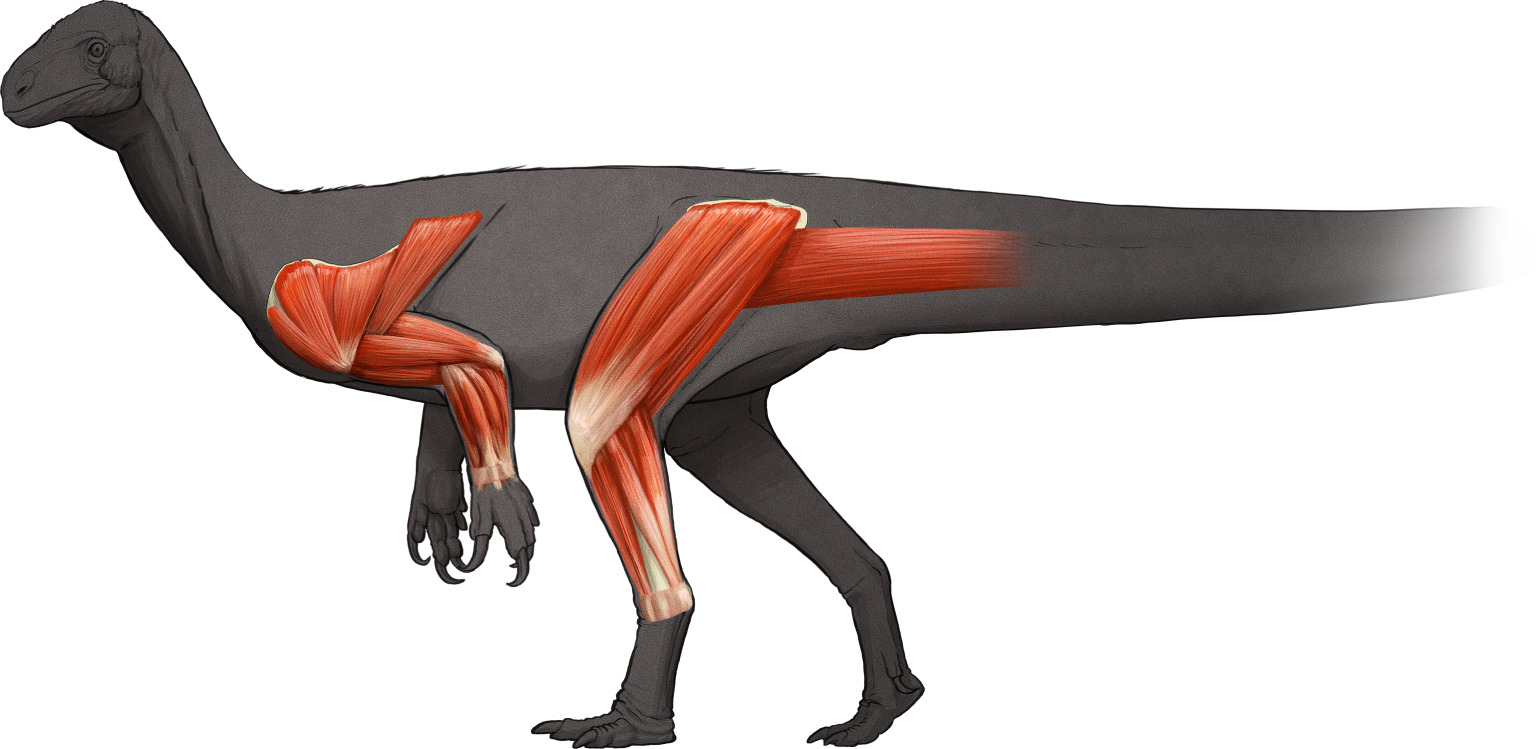
Reconstruction of limb musculature of Thecodontosaurus

Examination of Thecodontosaurus revealed it was exclusively bipedal. Studies of the muscle attachments in its fore and hindlimbs suggest that it was an extremely fast bipedal runner that relied on its weaker front limbs for grasping vegetation, cutting it up and feeding it into its mouth. Its advanced running capabilities suggest it was well adapted for high-speed sprinting, probably as a means of escaping predators.
