= Henry Riley (scientist) =

British surgeon, anatomist, naturalist, geologist and paleontologist

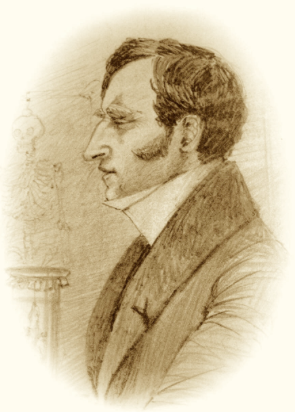
- Undated portrait of Henry Riley
- Born: 1797; Bristol
- Died: 1848 (age 50-51); Bristol
- Known for: Discovery of Palaeosaurus and Thecodontosaurus
- Scientific career
- Fields: Geology, Natural history, Anatomy

Henry Riley (1797–1848) was a British surgeon, anatomist, naturalist, geologist and paleontologist. He is notable for being the co-discoverer and co-describer of the archosaur Palaeosaurus and the dinosaur Thecodontosaurus.

== Early life ==
Henry Riley was born in Bristol in 1797. He trained to become a surgeon in Paris and he graduated during the mid-1820s.

He was one of the men who founded the Bristol Institution in the 1820s. Riley was involved in a body snatching scandal in the late 1820s - he was fined £6 (inflated to £657.29 in 2019) in 1828. He was later revoked of this claim during the 1830s.

Riley married the daughter of fellow lecturer Henry Daniel, who lectured from 1810 until 1836.

== Career ==
His Geoffroyan lectures of 1831-33 were the first to be heard in Bristol. He was a physician at St. Peter's Hospital, Bristol in 1832 and the Bristol Royal Infirmary between 1834 and 1847.

He taught at Bristol Medical School until he retired in 1846 due to his deteriorating health.

=== Palaeontological discoveries ===
In 1833, Riley described the extinct ray-like chimaeriform Squaloraja based on a specimen found by Mary Anning four years earlier.

In the autumn of 1834, Riley and the curator of the Bristol Institution, Samuel Stutchbury, began to excavate "saurian remains" at the quarry of Durdham Down, at Clifton, presently a part of Bristol, which is part of the Magnesian Conglomerate. In 1834 and 1835, they briefly reported on the finds, and they provided their initial description in 1836, naming the new genera Palaeosaurus and Thecodontosaurus.

== Death ==
Two years after retiring, Riley died in 1848 in Bristol, aged 50 or 51.
