= Samuel Stutchbury =

English naturalist and geologist

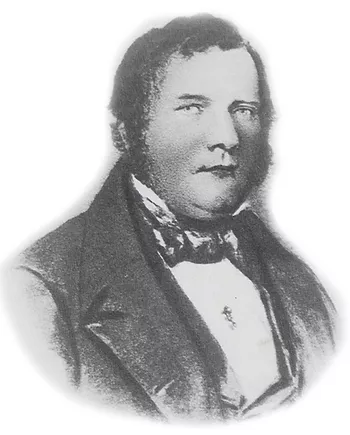
- Undated portrait of Samuel Stutchbury
- Born: 15 January 1798; London
- Died: 12 February 1859 (aged 61); Bristol
- Known for: Co-discovery of Thecodontosaurus
- Scientific career
- Fields: Geology, Natural history

Samuel Stutchbury (15 January 1798 – 12 February 1859) was an English naturalist and geologist. Alongside Henry Riley, Stutchbury was the co-discoverer of Thecodontosaurus, which in 1836 was the fourth dinosaur genus to be named. He also played a part in Gideon Mantell's naming of Iguanodon. As a geological surveyor he mapped a large area of eastern Australia.

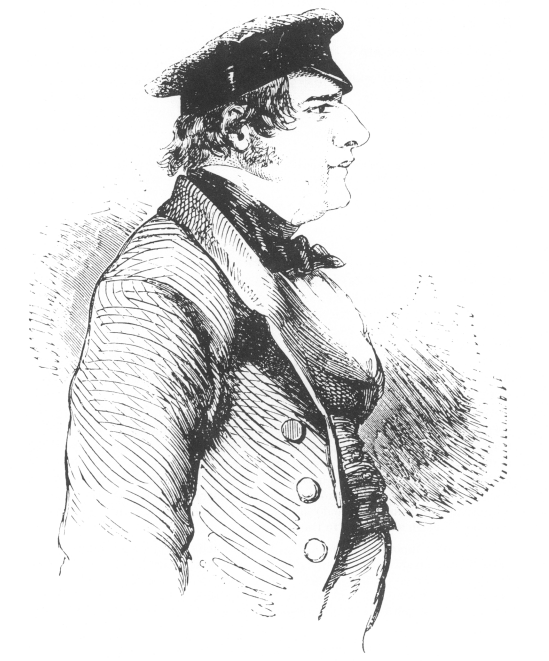
Samuel Stutchbury in July 1852, by Marshall Claxton

== Early life ==
Stutchbury was born on 15 January 1798 in London, the son of a gauging instrument maker. In 1820 he became assistant conservator at the Hunterian Museum in London and in 1821 was made an associate of the Linnean Society of London. In 1824 he had a part in Gideon Mantell's identification of Iguanodon, which in 1825 would become the second dinosaur to be formally named. It was Stutchbury who realised that Mantell's fossils of teeth resembled the teeth of the iguana specimen which Stutchbury had just prepared at the Hunterian Museum.

In 1825 he sailed on Sir George Osborne and later Rolla as a zoologist in an expedition of the Pacific Pearl Fishery Company to New South Wales and the Tuamotus.

== Later years ==
From 1831–50 Stutchbury was curator of the museum at the Bristol Institution (now Bristol City Museum and Art Gallery). Fossil finds from excavations that he carried out at Bristol with local naturalist Henry Riley led to their announcement of Thecodontosaurus in 1836. This was only the fourth dinosaur genus to be named, although it was originally omitted from the group Dinosauria when the group was named by Richard Owen in 1842.

In 1841 Stutchbury became a Fellow of the Geological Society of London.

From 1850–55 he worked as a geological and mineral surveyor in Australia. Originally appointed to survey the New South Wales gold finds, he eventually mapped 32,000 square miles (over 82,000 square km) from New South Wales to Queensland.

Stutchbury died on 12 February 1859 in Bristol. A number of fossil and recent organisms have been named after him.
