= Durdham Down =

Area of open space in Bristol, England

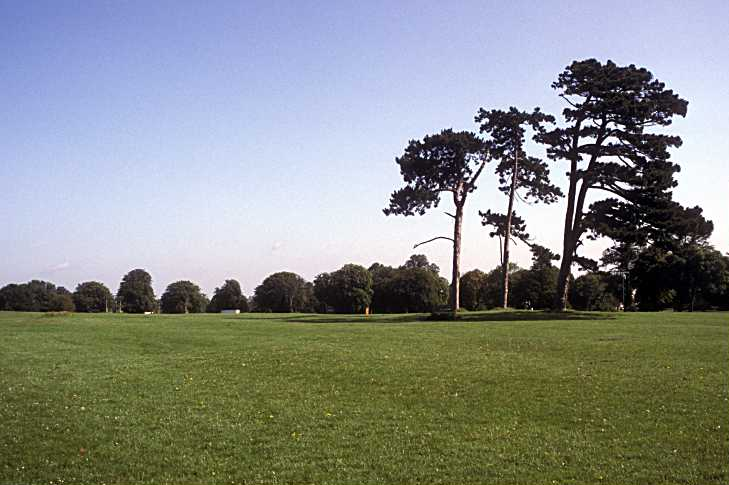
- Only three of Durdham Down's "Seven Sisters" now remain

- Location within Bristol
- Type: public open space
- Location: Bristol, England
- Coordinates: 51°28′24″N 2°37′05″W
- Area: 400 acres (160 ha)
- Open: All year

Durdham Down is an area of public open space in Bristol, England. With its neighbour Clifton Down to the southwest, it constitutes a 400-acre (1.6 km^{2}) area known as The Downs, much used for leisure including walking, jogging and team sports. Its exposed position makes it particularly suitable for kite flying.

== History ==
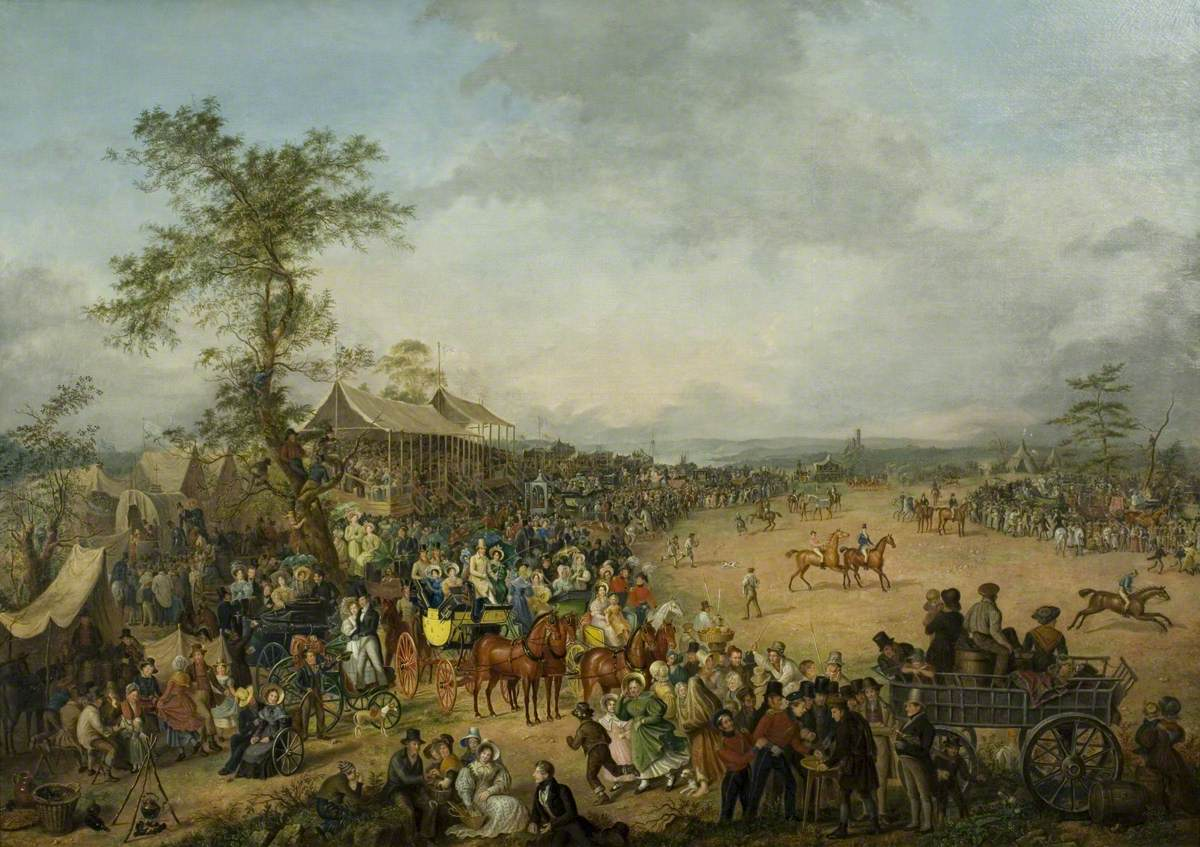
The Clifton Racecourse by Rolinda Sharples, 1836. It depicts a horseracing meeting held at Durdham Down

Durdham Down was long used as grazing land, since its thin soils made it unsuitable for arable land or woodland. An Anglo-Saxon charter of 883 grants grazing rights over part of Durdham Down. The down was the commons of pasture for the manor of Henbury during the Middle Ages. The land was also valuable farmland used by many farms in the area. In 1643 and 1645, during the English Civil War, Royalist and Parliamentarian armies assembled on the down.

In 1857, concerned by Victorian-built houses encroaching on the open space as the city expanded, the Bristol Corporation acquired commoners' rights on the downs, and exercised them the following year by grazing sheep. In 1861 Durdham Down itself was bought by the city from the Lords of the Manor and Hundred of Henbury for £15,000 via the Clifton and Durdham Downs (Bristol) Act 1861 (24 & 25 Vict. c. xiv). Grazing on the down declined during the 19th century, and finally ceased in 1925.

Since 1861 Durdham Down has been managed, with Clifton Down, by the Downs Committee, a joint committee of the corporation and the Society of Merchant Venturers, which owns Clifton Down. The committee appoints a Downs Ranger to oversee the Downs.

In November 1910 a Bristol Boxkite, which had been recently built by the British and Colonial Aeroplane Company's factory at the nearby village of Filton, landed on Durdham Down. During the course of that afternoon, the French pilot, M. Maurice Tetard, undertook several demonstration flights from this temporary airfield. Bristolians in large numbers flocked to The Downs to see this new-fangled flying machine.

A blue plaque on the public toilets by the water tower on Stoke Road commemorates Victoria Hughes, the toilet attendant from 1929 to 1962, who also looked after sex workers in the area. In 1977, aged 80, Hughes published her memoirs as Ladies' Mile.

== Features ==
The Down features clumps of scrubby hawthorns, the avenues of massive horse-chestnuts, the flat swathes of grass and the elegant bordering of Victorian houses. Its bird life has been a subject of study since at least the 1930s.

The White Tree roundabout is a road junction on Durdham Down. The roundabout was constructed in the 1950s, but the name appears to date back to the 19th century. For a short period in 1908, the White Tree was the terminus of the tram, before it was extended to Westbury. There have been several white trees at the junction, either a silver birch or a tree with a trunk painted white. One white tree was demolished to make way for the roundabout. Another white tree was cut down during the 1970s outbreak of Dutch elm disease.

The "Seven Sisters" are a group of pine trees on Durdham Down. A number of the trees have been lost over the years - notably in the 1990 Burns' Day storm - leaving three survivors. Replacement trees in the group have been vandalised, so an entirely new group of seven has been planted nearby.

== Sports ==
On Monday, 31 August 1752, there was a cricket match on the Down between Bristol Cricket Club and London Cricket Club for a stake of 20 guineas. This was announced in Felix Farley's Bristol Journal on Saturday, 29 August (Julian date).

The preamble to the Clifton and Durdham Downs (Bristol) Act 1861 noted that the Downs had 'been used as a place of public resort and recreation since time immemorial' and the intent was to safeguard this use. During the 19th century horse-races were held, especially at Easter, as well as wrestling and boxing contests and cricket matches. Other activities included donkey rides, bands, flower shows, circuses, public meetings and prostitution. Nowadays the sporting tradition carries on with the Bristol Downs Football League playing on permanently laid out pitches.

Gloucestershire County Cricket Club played its inaugural first-class match, against Surrey, at Durdham Down on 2, 3 and 4 June 1870.

== Gibbetings ==
As many as two gibbetings took place on Durdham Down. Joseph Abseny was a Swedish Catholic who was convicted of the murder of a servant girl in Bristol. He was sentenced to execution and gibbeting on 5 August 1749, being more worried by the gibbeting sentence than his execution; it was noted that "he did not care if they quarter'd his body so that it was not hung up in the air for Prey to the Birds". He was executed on 25 August that year before being gibbeted on Durdham Down.

There was another gibbeting for a footpad named Jenkin William Prothero, on what was Gallows Acre Lane. Prothero committed the crime of murdering a pig drover, and was sentenced to death on 26 March 1783, with the judge specifying that he should be gibbeted on Durdham Down. Prothero was hanged on 31 March 1783, and then gibbeted accordingly, which involved the dipping of his corpse in tar. Prothero's body in his gibbet cage was hung nearby the back of a residential house. Complaints were made about Prothero's gibbet, particularly by those who came to the hot wells near the Down. Its placement was noted as financially "injurious" to a widow who lived in the house close to the gibbet, as she could no longer let her apartment to "persons of decent repute" during the summer. As such, locals petitioned the Royal court for the movement of the body, and this was successful; the Sheriff of Gloucester received an order to locate a new area for the gibbet, or otherwise to have the body dissected. A far later account from the early 20th century suggested that Prothero's corpse was cut down as a result of rumours that had been circulating of his ghost leaving the gallows each night to haunt Clifton.

== Sources ==
- Buckley, G. B. (1935). Fresh Light on 18th Century Cricket. Birmingham: Cotterell & Co. OCLC 23450280.
- Tarlow, Sarah (2017), The Golden and Ghoulish Age of the Gibbet in Britain, London: Palgrave Macmillan UK, doi:10.1057/978-1-137-60089-9_3, ISBN 978-1-137-60088-2
