= Xiangyunloong =

Xiangyunloong Temporal range: Early Jurassic, Hettangian
- Tail vertebrae of the holotype

Scientific classification
- Kingdom: Animalia
- Phylum: Chordata
- Class: Reptilia
- Clade: Dinosauria
- Clade: Saurischia
- Clade: †Sauropodomorpha
- Genus: †Xiangyunloong
- Species: †X. fengming

Binomial name
- †Xiangyunloong fengming Hu et al., 2026

Genus of sauropodomorph dinosaur

Xiangyunloong (simplified Chinese: 祥云龙; traditional Chinese: 祥雲龍; pinyin: Xiángyúnlóng; meaning "auspicious cloud dragon") is a genus of massopodan sauropodomorph dinosaur known from fossils found in the Early Jurassic Fengjiahe Formation of Yunnan, China. The type and only species is Xiangyunloong fengming.

== Discovery and naming ==
Type locality in Yunnan, China

The holotype, YDDY 10001–10041, is a partial skeleton including cervical, dorsal and caudal vertebrae, several dorsal rib fragments, chevrons, an incomplete left ilium, and a right ischium. It was discovered in Dali Bai Autonomous Prefecture, Yunnan Province, China.

It was described as a new genus and species of sauropodomorph dinosaur in 2026. The generic name, Xiangyunloong, is a reference to Xiangyun (simplified Chinese: 祥云; traditional Chinese: 祥雲; pinyin: Xiángyún), the county where the holotype was discovered, with a name meaning "auspicious clouds". This is combined with the Chinese loong (simplified Chinese: 龙; traditional Chinese: 龍; pinyin: Lóng) or Chinese dragon, a symbol of power and auspiciousness. The specific name, fengming, (simplified Chinese: 凤鸣; traditional Chinese: 鳳鳴; pinyin: Fèngmíng; literally "phoenix calling"), carries several meanings—it is a reference to Luming (simplified Chinese: 鹿鸣乡; traditional Chinese: 鹿鳴鄉; pinyin: Lùmíng Xiāng; literally "deer calling"), the town where the holotype was found, as well as a nod to the dinosaur–bird connection. "Fengming" is also the original name of Lin Fengmian, the founding president of China Academy of Art, whose staff participated extensively in the naming of the species.

== Description ==
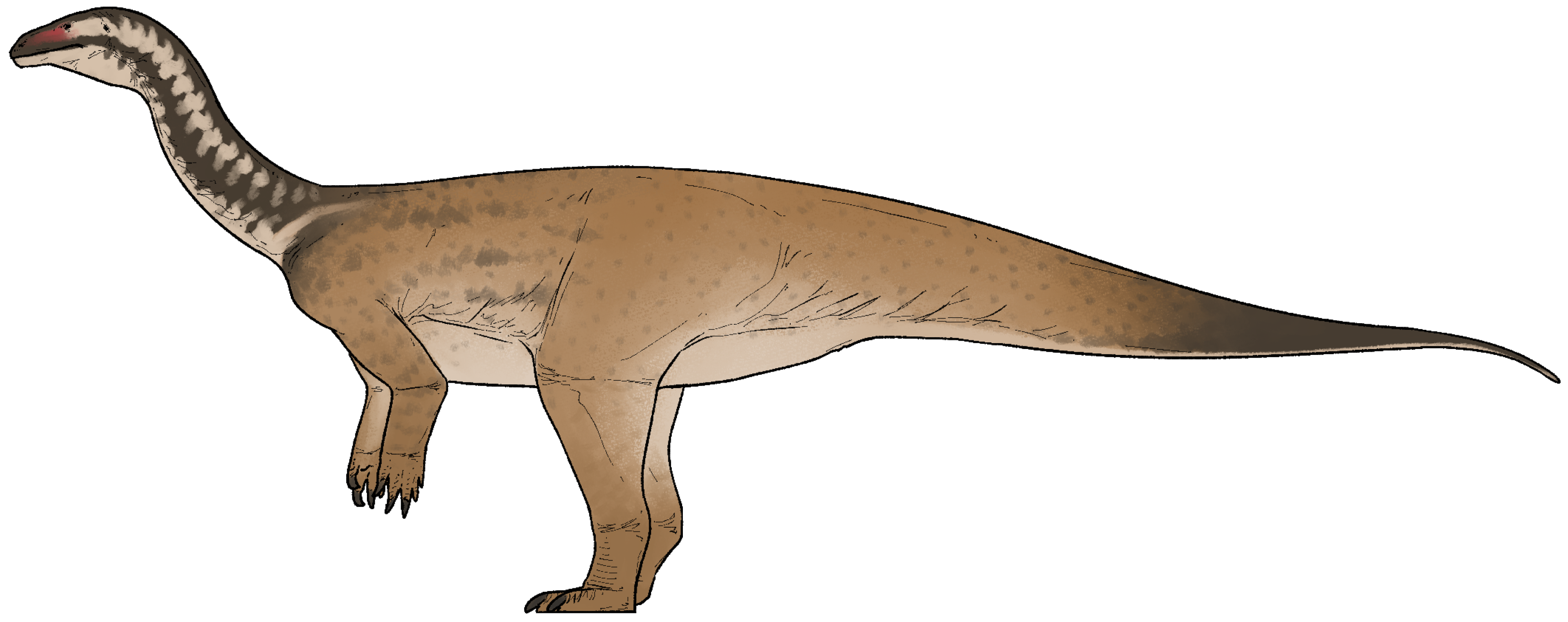
Life restoration

Based on comparisons with the roughly coeval Lishulong and Xingxiulong yueorum, the holotype individual of Xiangyunloong fengming has been estimated to have a body length of 9–10 m (30–33 ft).

== Classification ==
To determine the relationships of Xiangyunloong, Hu et al. scored it in the phylogenetic analysis of Wang et al. (2025). This analysis placed Xiangyunloong in an unresolved polytomy with both species of Xingxiulong. A cladogram adapted from their analysis is shown below:

- Massopoda
  - - Macrocollum
    - Musankwa
    - Pradhania
  - - - Wudingloong
      - - Plateosauravus
        - Ruehleia
    - - Anchisaurus
      - - Massospondylidae
        - - - Qianlong
            - Yunnanosaurus huangi
          - - - Xiangyunloong
              - Xingxiulong yueorum
              - Xingxiulong chengi
            - - - Jingshanosaurus
                - Seitaad
              - - Sauropodiformes
