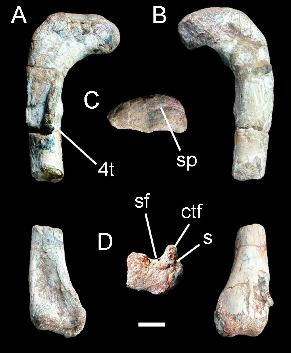
- Holotype distal femur (D) and historically referred proximal femur (A–C)

Scientific classification
- Kingdom: Animalia
- Phylum: Chordata
- Class: Reptilia
- Clade: Archosauria
- Clade: Avemetatarsalia
- Clade: incertae sedis
- Genus: †Alwalkeria; Chatterjee & Creisler, 1994
- Species: †A. maleriensis

Binomial name
- †Alwalkeria maleriensis (Chatterjee, 1987)

Synonyms
- Walkeria Chatterjee, 1987 (preoccupied); Alickmeron Sen & Ray, 2025

= Alwalkeria =

Alwalkeria Temporal range: Late Triassic, 228 Ma

Extinct genus of dinosaurs

Alwalkeria (/ˌælwɔːˈkɪəriə/; "for Alick Walker") is a historically problematic extinct genus of avemetatarsalian known from the Late Triassic Lower Maleri Formation of India. The genus contains a single species, Alwalkeria maleriensis. It was initially described in 1987 under the genus name 'Walkeria', based on a partial skull, several vertebrae, and fragmentary hindlimb bones. As this name is preoccupied, the new genus Alwalkeria was proposed to replace it. Early research interpreted the material belonging to a 'podokesaurid' (coelophysoid) theropod, herrerasaur, or Eoraptor-like basal eusaurischian dinosaur. Subsequent work recognized the chimaeric status of the fossils referred to this species, as they belong to multiple unrelated taxa. Some of the bones may belong to a dinosaur, and the skull is likely from a pseudosuchian. A 2025 study suggested lagerpetid affinities for the femora, though this was deemed unlikely by a subsequent review, which regarded A. maleriensis as a member of Pan-Aves (Avemetatarsalia) of uncertain placement.

== History and classification ==
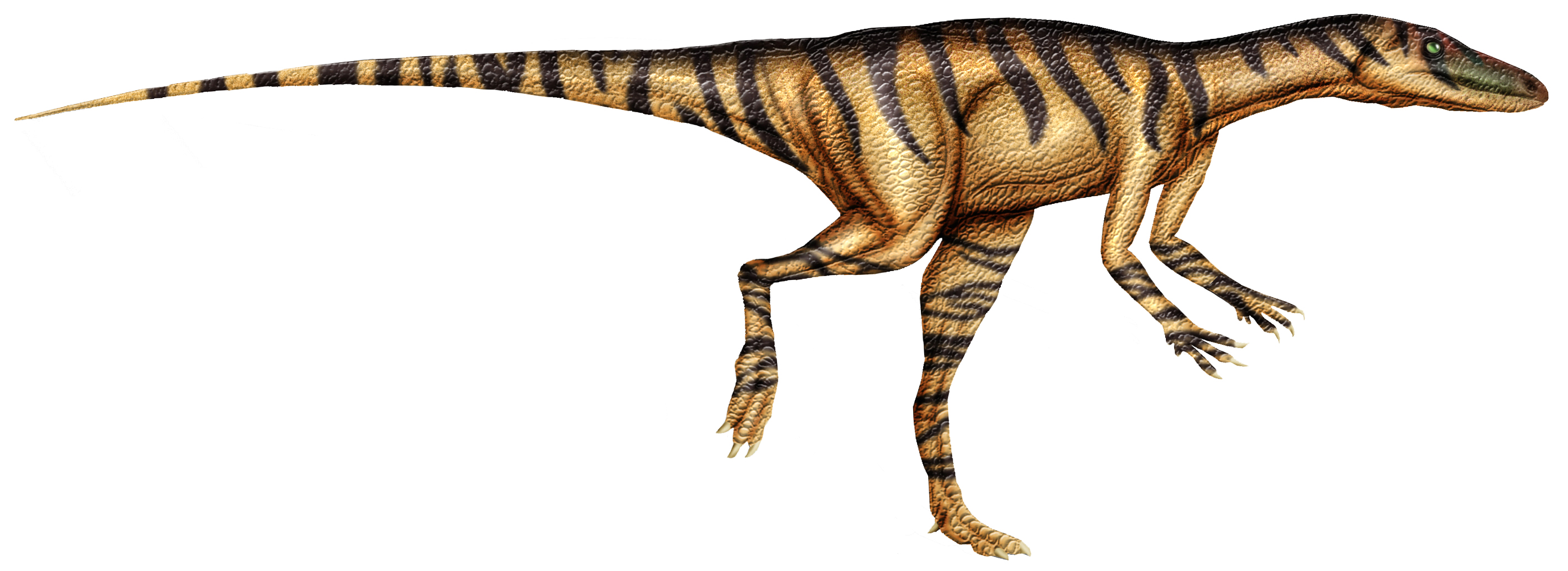
Speculative life restoration as a dinosaur

In 1987, Sankar Chatterjee named Walkeria maleriensis as a new genus and species of podokesaurid theropod dinosaurs based on specimen ISI R 306, which includes a partial skull, around 28 vertebrae, a proximal left femur, a distal right femur, and an astragalus (ankle bone). The specimen was recovered in the Godavari Valley locality from the Maleri Formation of Andhra Pradesh, India. The remains were collected by Chatterjee in 1974 in red mudstone that was deposited during the Carnian stage of the Triassic period, approximately 235 to 228 million years ago. The specimen is housed in the collection of the Indian Statistical Institute, in Kolkata, India.

The generic name, Walkeria, was proposed in honor of British paleontologist Alick Walker. The specific name, maleriensis, is a reference to the Lower Maleri Formation, in southern India, where its fossils were found. Chatterjee described the taxon as a basal theropod. Since the original generic name was found to be preoccupied by a bryozoan, the new replacement generic name Alwalkeria was created in 1994 by Chatterjee and Ben Creisler.

In 1996, Loyal et al. agreed with a theropod identity for the type material. Paul (1988) understood Alwalkeria as a link between herrerasaurids and the genus Protoavis, and hence assigned it to Herrerasauridae based on features of the femur. However, Langer (2004) and Martínez and Alcober (2009), observed that Alwalkeria was too primitive to be a theropod and considered it a basal saurischian.

=== Chimeric identity ===
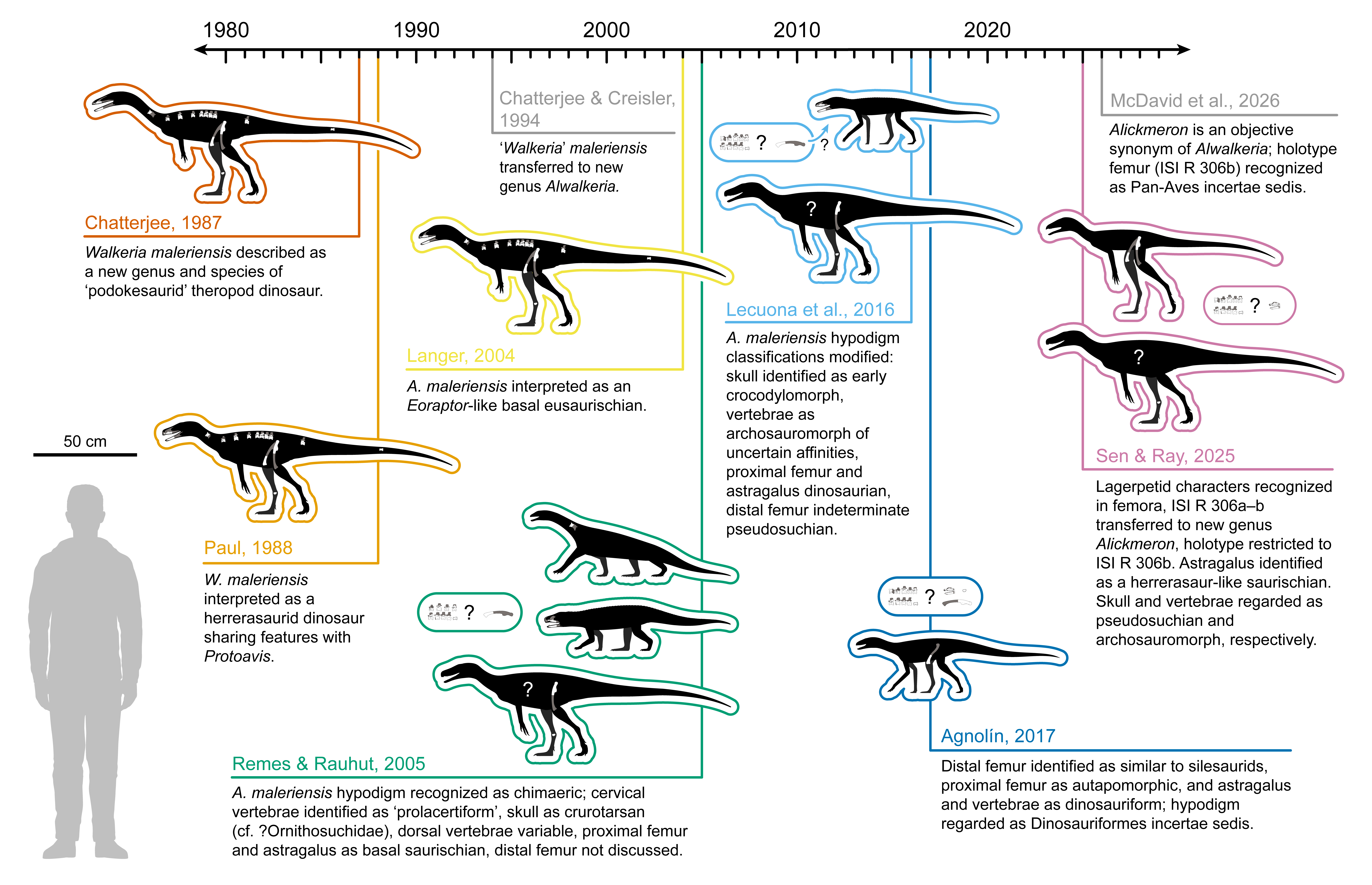
Taxonomic and nomenclatural timeline of the Alwalkeria fossil material

In 2005, Rauhut and Remes found Alwalkeria to be a chimera, with the anterior skull referable to a crurotarsan, and the vertebrae referable to various other ancient reptiles including Prolacertiformes; however, they claimed the femur and the astragalus were clearly dinosaurian, with the latter possessing saurischian characteristics. In 2011, Novas and colleagues argued that Alwalkeria remains valid on the basis of an unusual morphology of its femur and an astragalus with a conservative morphology more similar to that of basal dinosaurs. In 2016, Lecuona, Ezcurra & Irmis reiterated the chimaeric nature of the Alwalkeria holotype, noting that the skull material could be referred to the Crocodylomorpha. They also observed that the distal femur was more consistent with the morphology of pseudosuchians, leading them to identify this bone fragment as an indeterminate representative of that clade. The vertebrae lack anatomical features allowing for a precise identification, dinosaur, pseudosuchian, or otherwise.

In 2025, Sen & Ray determined the partial femora belonged to a novel representative of the Lagerpetidae, which they named Alickmeron maleriensis. The authors did not classify the astragalus within the genus Alwalkeria, but rather as indeterminate saurischian comparable in morphology to an unnamed Argentinan herrerasaurid. In 2026, McDavid, Marchant, and Reid stated that Alickmeron is an objective junior synonym of Alwalkeria, due to both taxa having the same type species based on the same holotype, Walkeria maleriensis, based on ISI R 306. They agreed with restricting the holotype of Alwalkeria to ISI R 306b, the distal femur, but suggested that the taxon can only be confidently assigned to Pan-Aves (=Avemetatarsalia) incertae sedis, not a lagerpetid pterosauromorph as proposed by Sen & Ray (2025). They further regarded the referral of any other material, including the proximal femur, to A. maleriensis as ambiguous.

== Paleoecology ==
The Maleri Formation has been interpreted as being the site of an ancient lake or river. Material of the sauropodomorphs Jaklapallisaurus and Nambalia and the herrerasaurian Maleriraptor have been found in the Upper Maleri Formation, as well as intermediate prosauropod remains.
