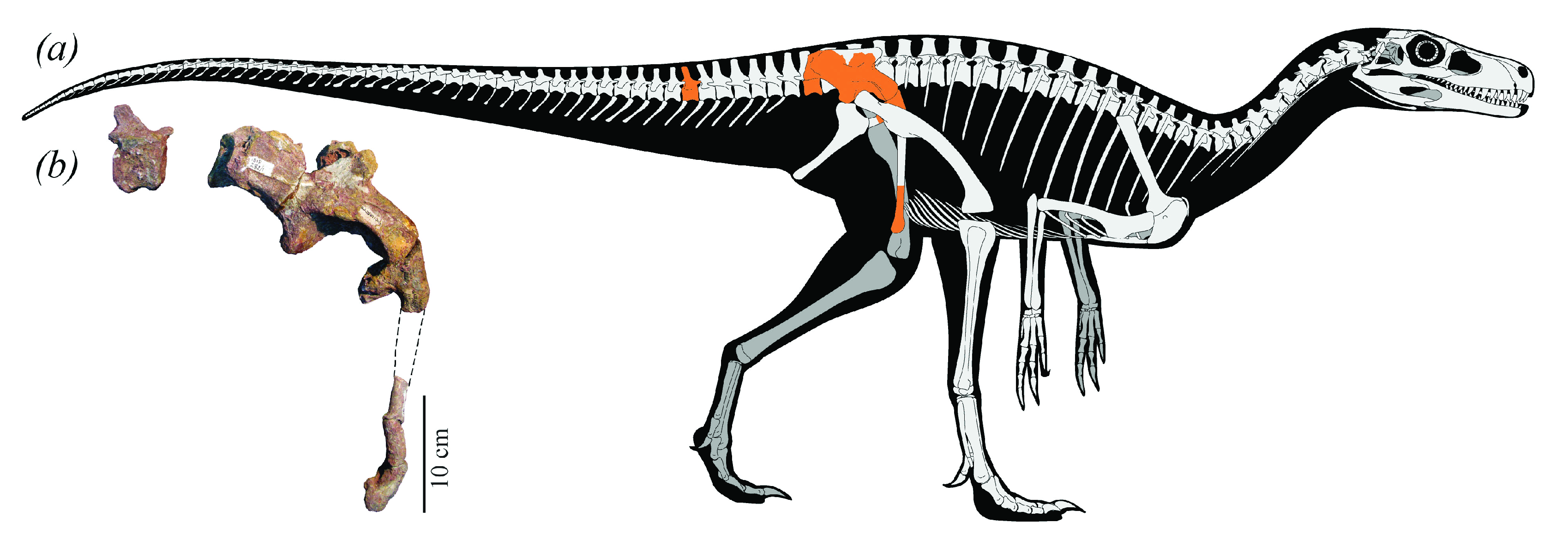
- Reconstructed skeleton with known material colored (a) and holotype specimen (b)

Scientific classification
- Kingdom: Animalia
- Phylum: Chordata
- Class: Reptilia
- Clade: Dinosauria
- Clade: Saurischia
- Clade: †Herrerasauria
- Genus: †Maleriraptor; Ezcurra et al., 2025
- Species: †M. kuttyi

Binomial name
- †Maleriraptor kuttyi Ezcurra et al., 2025

= Maleriraptor =

Maleriraptor Temporal range: Late Triassic, early Norian

Genus of herrerasaurian dinosaurs

Maleriraptor is an extinct genus of herrerasaurian saurischian dinosaurs from the Late Triassic (Norian) Upper Maleri Formation of India. The genus contains a single species, M. kuttyi, known from a partial skeleton.

== Discovery and naming ==
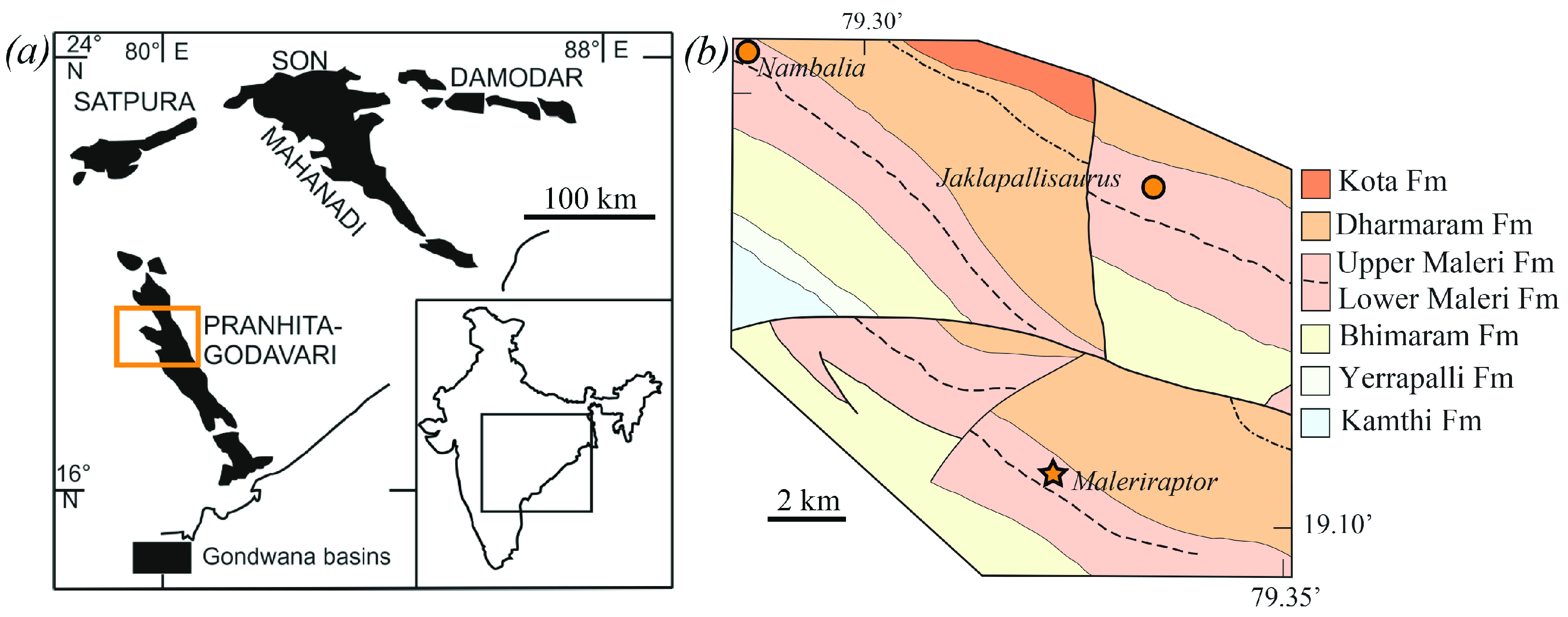
Type locality (a) and stratigraphic occurrence (b) of Maleriraptor

The Maleriraptor holotype specimen, ISIR 282, was collected at some point prior to 1985 from outcrops of the Upper Maleri Formation of the Pranhita–Godavari Basin near Annaram in south-central India. The specimen consists of the first sacral vertebra, part of the second sacral rib, a vertebra representing a caudosacral element or the first in the caudal series, an anterior (toward the front) caudal vertebra, the right ilium, both ends of the right pubis, and part of the left pubis. ISIR 282 is accessioned at the Indian Statistical Institute.

ISIR 282 was first described in a 2011 publication by Novas et al. reporting several new dinosauriform specimens from the Upper Maleri Formation. They noted that exhibited a unique character combination that distinguished it from related species. However, the authors refrained from naming the specimen as it could not be compared with Alwalkeria, a similarly-aged saurischian from the slightly older Lower Maleri Formation.

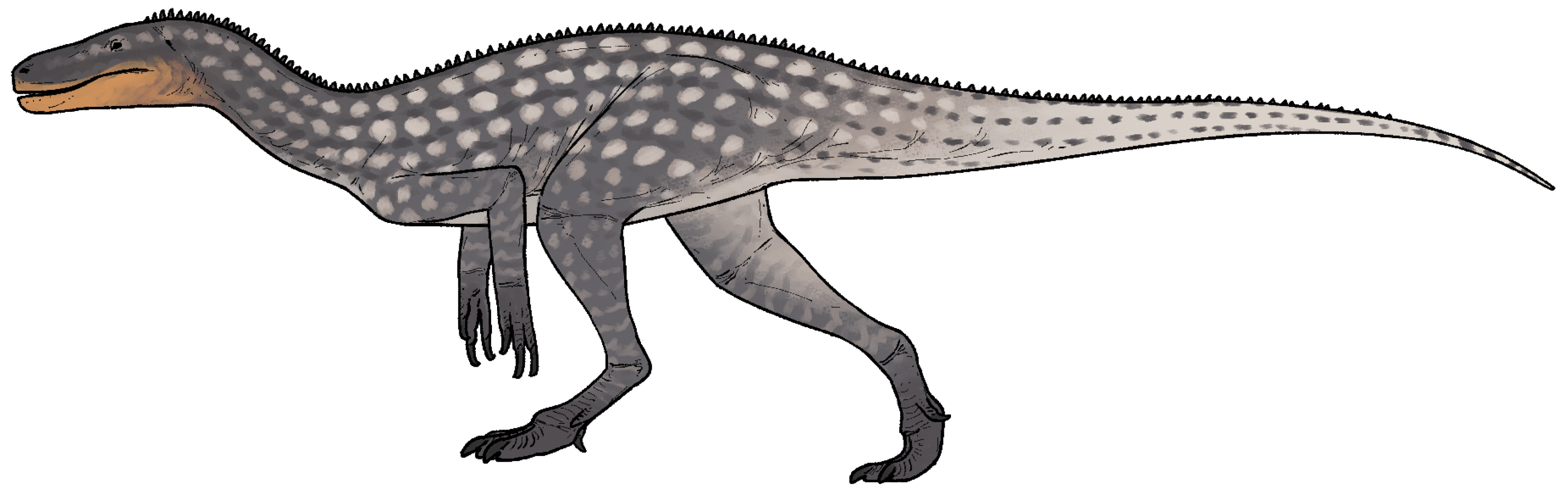
Speculative life restoration

In 2025, Ezcurra and colleagues described Maleriraptor kuttyi as a new genus and species of early saurischian dinosaurs based on these fossil remains. The generic name, Maleriraptor, combines a reference to the discovery of the holotype in the Upper Maleri Formation with the Latin word raptor, meaning "thief". The specific name, kuttyi, honors Tharavat S. Kutty, the discoverer and initial describer of the holotype.

Ezcurra et al. noted that a lack of overlapping material between Maleriraptor and Alwalkeria still precluded comparisons between the two and that the uncertain affinities of the latter did little to clarify their distinction. Regardless, they opted to name Maleriraptor kuttyi, anticipating species-level differences between the Upper and Lower Maleri formations and hoping that future discoveries of more complete Alwalkeria specimens could allow for an improved understanding of the relationships of these taxa.

== Classification ==
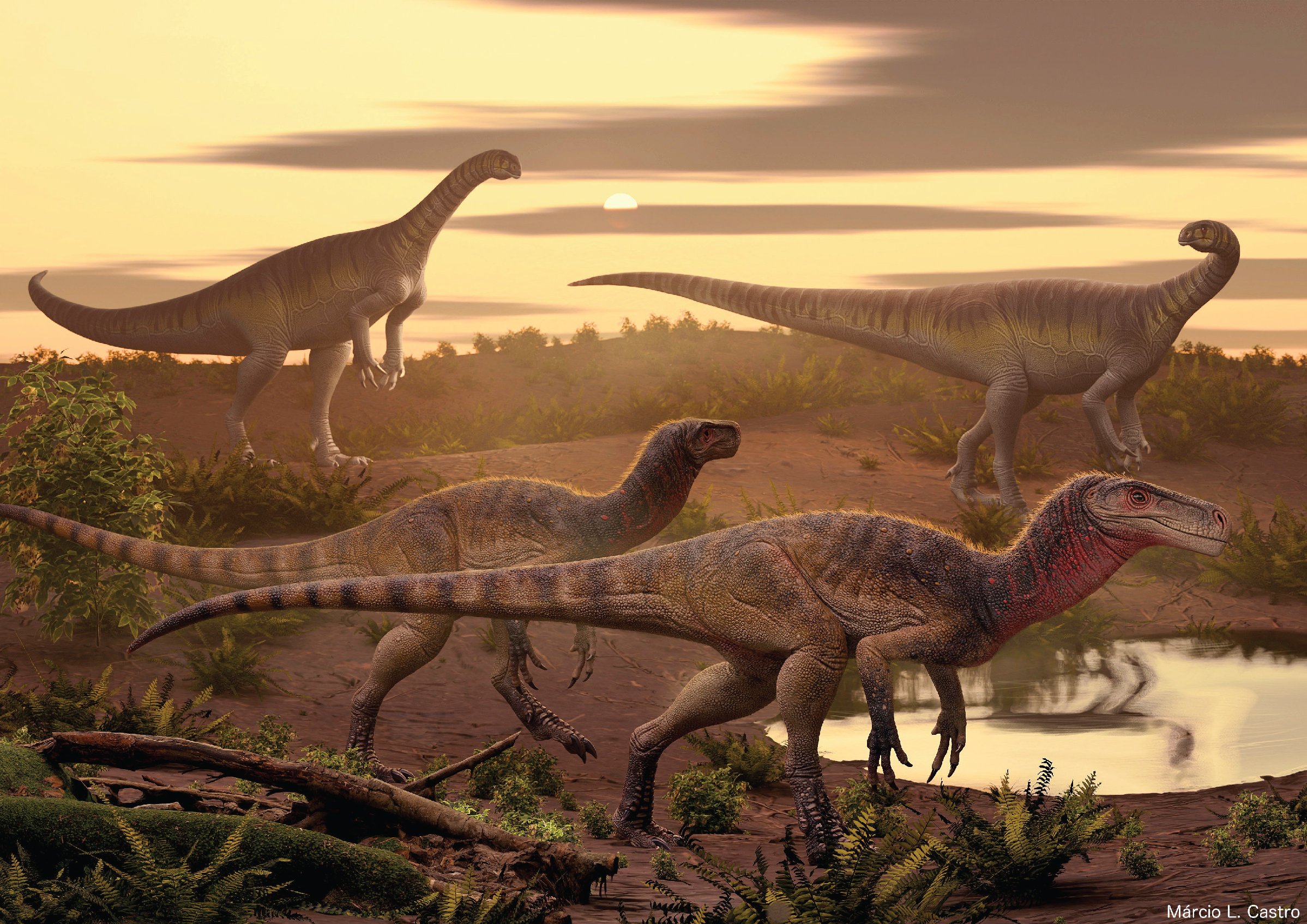
Speculative ennvironmental reconstruction of Maleriraptor and the coeval sauropodomorph Jaklapallisaurus

In their initial description of ISIR 282, Novas et al. (2011) reported it as belonging to an indeterminate dinosauriform; their phylogenetic analysis including the specimen recovered it in a polytomy with Silesaurus, Ornithischia, Theropoda, Sauropodomorpha, and three herrerasaurs. They argued that the open acetabulum and straight shaft of the pubis indicated a position more derived than silesaurids and that several anatomical characters excluded it from sauropodomorphs, but regarded its phylogenetic placement as "highly problematic". In 2021, Novas et al. reported ISIR 282 as belonging to an indeterminate herrerasaur without detailed discussion.

To more accurately determine the relationships of Maleriraptor, Ezcurra et al. (2025) scored it an updated version of the Ezcurra et al. (2023) phylogenetic dataset. This matrix placed Maleriraptor as an early-diverging member of the saurischian clade Herrerasauria. Scoring it in the Garcia et al. (2024) matrix yielded similar results, with Maleriraptor as a non-herrerasaurid herresaur. The results using the Ezcurra et al. (2023) dataset are displayed in the cladogram below:

- Saurischia
  - Eusaurischia
    - Theropoda
    - Sauropodomorpha
  - Herrerasauria
    - CAPPA/UFSM 0373 (Santa Maria Fm. taxon)
    - - Maleriraptor
      - - TTU-P10082 (Cooper Canyon Fm. taxon)
        - - - Daemonosaurus
            - Tawa
            - Chindesaurus
          - Herrerasauridae
            - Staurikosaurus
            - - Sanjuansaurus
              - - UFSM 11330 (Santa Maria Fm. taxon)
                - Gnathovorax
                - Herrerasaurus
