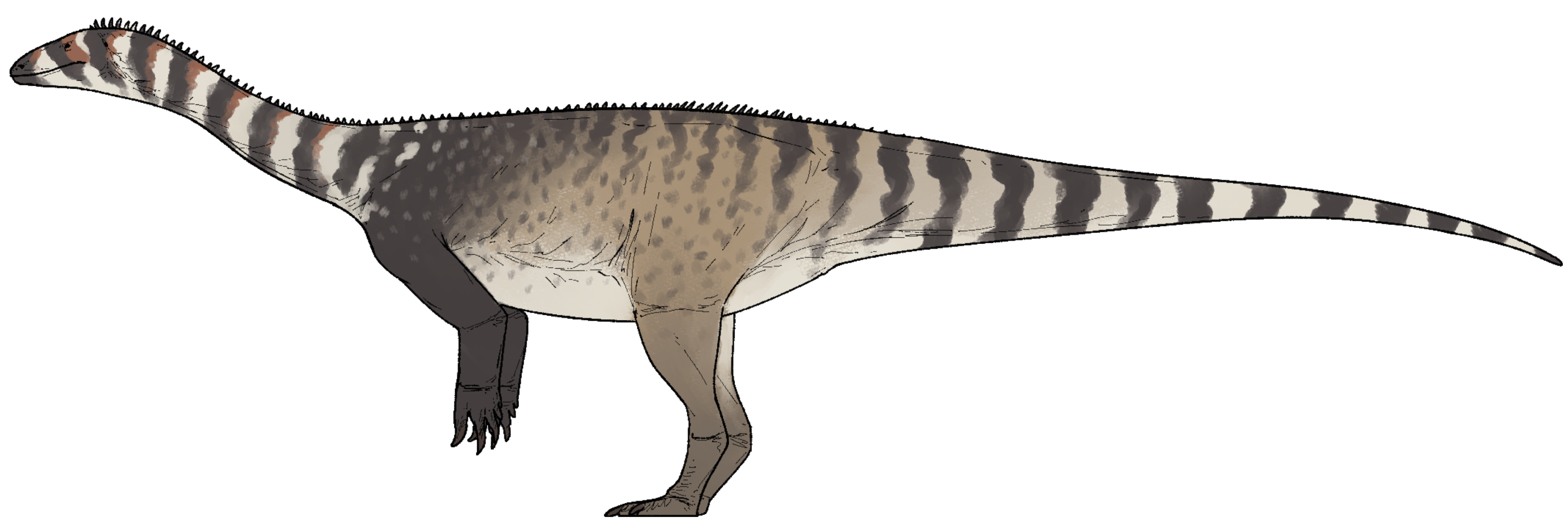
- Life restoration

Scientific classification
- Kingdom: Animalia
- Phylum: Chordata
- Class: Reptilia
- Clade: Dinosauria
- Clade: Saurischia
- Clade: †Sauropodomorpha
- Clade: †Unaysauridae
- Genus: †Musango; Barrett et al., 2026
- Species: †M. matusadonaensis

Binomial name
- †Musango matusadonaensis Barrett et al., 2026

= Musango =

Musango Temporal range: Late Triassic, Norian

Genus of sauropodomorph dinosaurs

Musango is an extinct genus of unaysaurid sauropodomorph dinosaurs from the Upper Triassic (Norian) Pebbly Arkose Formation of Zimbabwe. The genus contains a single species, Musango matusadonaensis, known from a partial skeleton. Musango represents the fifth dinosaur genus to be named from Zimbabwe.

== Discovery and naming ==
The Musango holotype specimen consists of five dorsal (trunk) vertebrae, at least two sacral (hip) vertebrae, at least 15 caudal vertebrae, dorsal rib fragments, gastralia, three partial chevrons, a left scapula and coracoid (shoulder blade), an incomplete left humerus (forearm bone), a manual ungual (hand claw), a partial left ilium, a right pubis (hip bones), a partial right tibia and fibula (lower leg bones), the left astragalus and calcaneum (ankle bones), a left metatarsal, one pedal phalanx (toe bones), and various indeterminate bone fragments. It was discovered in March 2018 on the margin of Lake Kariba by a South African/Zimbabwean-led expedition, and is permanently accessioned in the Natural History Museum of Zimbabwe in Bulawayo, Zimbabwe, under the code NHMZ 2583.

In 2026, Paul Barrett and his colleagues described NHMZ 2583 as belonging to a new genus and species of sauropodomorph dinosaurs. The generic name, Musango, refers to the Musango Archosaur Site within the Musango Concession Area near the Musango Safari Camp on the shores of Lake Kariba, Zimbabwe, where the holotype was recovered. 'Musango' is a chiShona word meaning 'living in the bush', which can be construed as a reference to the remoteness of the holotype locality. The specific name, matusadonaensis, refers to Matusadona National Park, near the holotype locality.

Musango is the fifth genus of dinosaurs to be named from Zimbabwe, following "Syntarsus" rhodesiensis in 1969, Vulcanodon in 1972, and the contemporary Mbiresaurus in 2022 and Musankwa in 2024.

== Description ==
Based on more complete relatives, Musango was likely an obligate biped. A holotype individual's body length was calculated at about 4.5 meters and its body mass was calculated at about 222 kilograms.

== Classification ==
To determine the relationships of Musango, Barrett et al. (2026) inserted it into the phylogenetic analysis of Barrett et al. (2024). This analysis placed Musango in the clade Unaysauridae, as the sister taxon to Musankwa. A cladogram adapted from their analysis is shown below. Clade names have been inserted based on definitions from Otero & Peyre de Fabrègues (2022) and Apaldetti & Martinez (2022) for clarity.

- Plateosauria
  - Issi
  - - Plateosaurus gracilis
    - Plateosaurus trossingensis
  - Unaysauridae
    - Pradhania
    - Macrocollum
    - - Unaysaurus
      - - Musankwa
        - Musango
  - - - Riojasaurus
      - Eucnemesaurus fortis
      - Eucnemesaurus entaxonis
    - - Sarahsaurus
      - - Massospondylidae
        - Sauropodiformes
