= Sankar Chatterjee =

American paleontologist

- Born: June 28, 1943 (age 82); Kolkata, India
- Citizenship: India
- Education: University of Calcutta (Ph.D.)
- Known for: Study of prehistoric vertebrates
- Scientific career
- Fields: Paleontology
- Institutions: Texas Tech University
- Thesis: (1970)

Sankar Chatterjee (born May 28, 1943) is a paleontologist, the Paul W. Horn Professor of Geosciences at Texas Tech University and curator of Paleontology at the Museum of Texas Tech University. He earned his PhD from the University of Calcutta, India, in 1970, and was a postdoctoral fellow at the Smithsonian Institution from 1977-1978.

Chatterjee has focused on the origin, evolution, functional anatomy, and systematics of Mesozoic vertebrates, including basal archosaurs, dinosaurs, pterosaurs, and birds. He has researched Late Triassic reptiles in India, such as phytosaurs, rhynchosaurs, and prolacertiformes. He is best known for his work on vertebrates recovered in the 1980s from the Post Quarry in the Late Triassic Cooper Canyon Formation (Dockum Group) of West Texas. The material includes the large rauisuchian Postosuchus, which was named for the nearby town of Post. It also included controversial specimens Chatterjee identified as being avian (Protoavis). The identification of these specimens as avian would push back the origin of birds by at least 75 million years.

In 2008, Chatterjee and Rick Lind designed a 30-inch unmanned aerial vehicle with a large, thin rudder inspired by the crest of Tupandactylus, to be called a Pterodrone. The large, thin, rudder-like sail on its head functioned as a sensory organ that acted similarly to a flight computer in a modern-day aircraft and also helped with the animal's turning agility. “These animals take the best parts of bats and birds,” Chatterjee said. “They had the maneuverability of a bat, but could glide like an albatross. Nothing alive today compares to the performance and agility of these animals. They lived for 160 million years, so they were not stupid animals. The skies were darkened by flocks of them. They were the dominant flying animals of their time. [… W]e’ve found they could actually sail on the wind for very long periods as they flew over the oceans… By raising their wings like sails on a boat, they could use the slightest breeze in the same way a catamaran moves across water. They could take off quickly and fly long distances with little effort.”

Chatterjee authored the controversial hypothesis of the Shiva crater in the Arabian Sea as a (partial) source of the K-Pg extinction event.

== Genera named ==
These genera were named by Chatterjee:

Name	Year	Status	Coauthor(s)	Notes / Image
Alwalkeria	1994	Valid taxon	Creisler	
Barapasaurus	1975	Valid taxon	Jain; Kutty; Roy-Chowdhury	
Jaklapallisaurus	2011	Valid taxon	Fernando E. Novas; Martin D. Ezcurra; Kutty	
Lamplughsaura	2007	Valid taxon	Kutty; Peter Galton; Upchurch	
Nambalia	2011	Valid taxon	Fernando E. Novas; Martin D. Ezcurra; Kutty	
Postosuchus	1985	Valid taxon	N/A	
Pradhania	2007	Valid taxon	Kutty; Peter Galton; Upchurch	
Protoavis	1991	nomen dubium	N/A	
Shuvosaurus	1993	Valid taxon	N/A	
Technosaurus	1995	Valid taxon	N/A	
Tikisuchus	1987	Valid taxon	Pranab K. Majumdar	
Walkeria	1987	Preoccupied	N/A	Name preoccupied by a bryozoan, renamed Alwalkeria in 1994

== Selected publications ==
- Chatterjee, Sankar (August 1997). "Multiple Impacts at the KT Boundary and the Death of the Dinosaurs". 30th International Geological Congress. Vol. 26. pp. 31–54. ISBN 978-90-6764-254-5.
- Chatterjee, Sankar (15 October 2009). "Giant Impact Near India -- Not Mexico -- May Have Doomed Dinosaurs". 2009 Annual GSA Meeting, 18–21 October. The Geological Society of America Release No. 09-54. Archived from the original on 16 June 2010.
- Chatterjee, Sankar; Mehrotra, Naresh M. (18 October 2009). "The Significance of the Contemporaneous Shiva Impact Structure and Deccan Volcanism at the KT Boundary". 2009 Portland GSA Annual Meeting (18-21 October 2009). pp. 50–9. Archived from the original on 6 April 2010.

=== Books ===
- Chatterjee, Sankar; Hotton III, Nicholas, eds. (1992). New concepts in global tectonics. Lubbock, USA: Texas Tech University Press. p. 450. ISBN 0-8967-2269-4.
- Chatterjee, Sankar (1997). The Rise of Birds. Baltimore: Johns Hopkins University Press. p. 312.
- Chatterjee, Sankar; Templin, RJ (2004). Special Paper: Posture, Locomotion, and Paleoecology of Pterosaurs. Vol. 376. Boulder, CO: The Geological Society of America. pp. 64 + iv. ISBN 0-8137-2376-0.
