= Walkeria tuberosa =

Scientific classification
- Domain: Eukaryota
- Kingdom: Animalia
- Phylum: Bryozoa
- Class: Gymnolaemata
- Order: Ctenostomatida
- Family: Walkeriidae
- Genus: Walkeria
- Species: W. tuberosa

Binomial name
- Walkeria tuberosa Heller, 1867

Synonyms
- Valkeria tuberosa Heller, 1867

Species of moss animal

Walkeria tuberosa is a species of colonial bryozoan in the order Ctenostomatida. It is native to the Mediterranean Sea, and has spread to the Red Sea and the Indo-Pacific region.

This species was first described in 1867 by Austrian zoologist Camill Heller, and was named in honour of Scottish minister and natural historian John Walker, a professor at the University of Edinburgh. Some confusion exists as to whether the original scientific name of the bryozoan was Walkeria tuberosa or Valkeria tuberosa. The genus name Walkeria was in 1994 given to a genus of dinosaurs, in this case being in honour of British palaeontologist Alick Walker. When the name was found to have been used previously, so was not available, the dinosaurs were renamed Alwalkeria.

== Description ==
Walkeria tuberosa is a colonial bryozoan and forms small clusters developing from a thread-like stolon that creeps across the substrate. The zooids are vase-shaped and grow in groups direct from the stolon and not from each other. Each zooid is about 2 to 3 mm (0.08 to 0.12 in) long and tipped by a relatively long lophophore with a crown of eight tentacles. The clusters of zooids are about 1 cm (0.4 in) apart. The colony is light beige or pale grey.

== Distribution and habitat ==
Walkeria tuberosa was first described from the Adriatic Sea and is also found in the western, central, and eastern Mediterranean, including between Crete and Turkey. It is also sporadically found in the Red Sea and the Indo-Pacific region, including Malaysia and New Zealand. It occurs from the lower littoral zone down to about 45 m (150 ft). It grows on rocks and other hard substrates, as well as on the thalli of algae. When the tufts of zooids grow among a crowded community of other organisms, its presence is very difficult to detect, but where it grows alone, on an otherwise bare surface, it is easier to spot; such a surface might be a thallus of a red alga such as Peyssonnelia species, of a green alga such as Codium or Flabellia species, or a colonial tunicate such as Aplidium undulatum.
