= Wudingloong =

Wudingloong Temporal range: Early Jurassic (Hettangian–Sinemurian), ~200.17 Ma

Scientific classification
- Kingdom: Animalia
- Phylum: Chordata
- Class: Reptilia
- Clade: Dinosauria
- Clade: Saurischia
- Clade: †Sauropodomorpha
- Clade: †Massopoda
- Genus: †Wudingloong; Wang et al., 2025
- Species: †W. wui

Binomial name
- †Wudingloong wui Wang et al., 2025

Genus of sauropodomorph dinosaurs

External image
- Holotype: photograph of the fossils and reconstructed skeleton

Wudingloong is an extinct genus of massopodan sauropodomorph dinosaurs known from the Early Jurassic Yubacun Formation of China. The genus contains a single species, Wudingloong wui, known from a partial skeleton including the skull.

== Discovery and naming ==
At some point following September 2020, an assemblage of dinosaur fossils was discovered near Wande Town in Wuding County of Yunnan Province, China. The fossil assemblage represents outcrops of the Yubacun Formation. The Wudingloong holotype specimen, LFGT-YW002, was the first dinosaur skeleton to be prepared from the locality. The specimen consists of a damaged skull and mandible, a complete series of ten cervical vertebrae, the first seven dorsal vertebrae, some dorsal ribs, the right scapulocoracoid, and the right forelimb including most of the manus.

In 2025, Wang and colleagues described Wudingloong wui as a new genus and species of early-diverging sauropodomorphs based on these fossil remains. The generic name, Wudingloong, combines a reference to the discovery of the fossil in Wuding County with the Chinese "龙" (loong), or Chinese dragon. The specific name, wui, honors paleontologist Xiao-Chun Wu and his research on fossils from Yunnan Province.

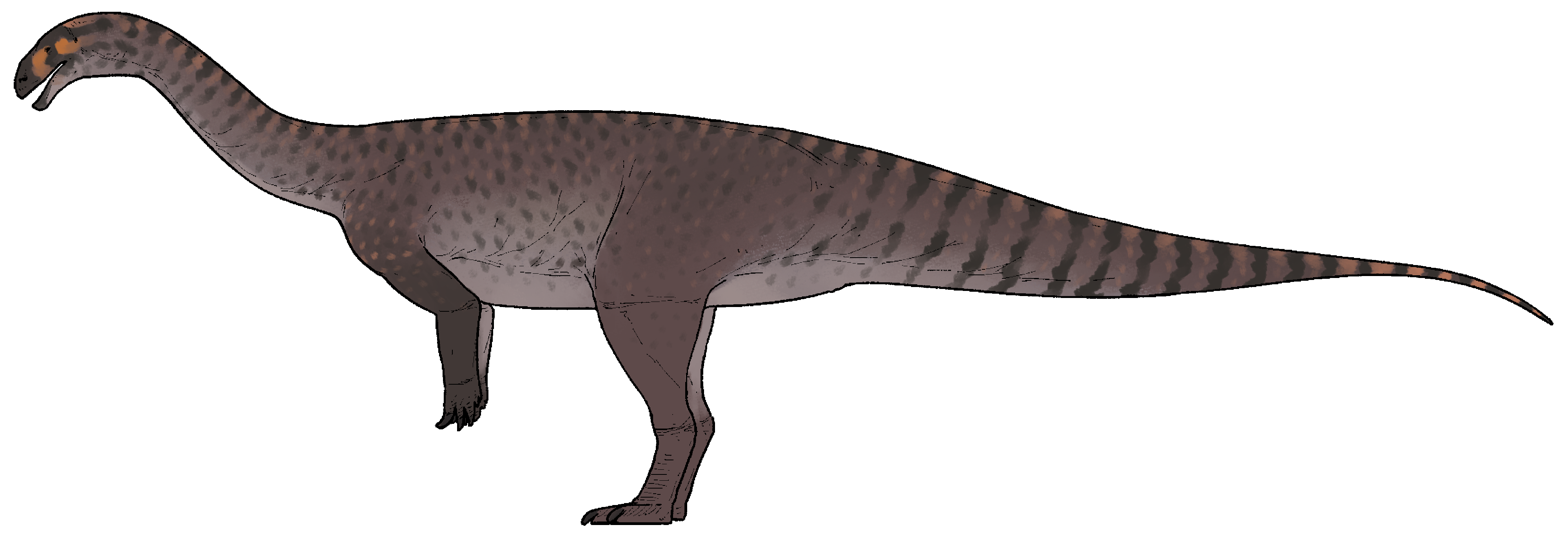
Life restoration

Wudingloong represents the oldest sauropodomorph known from East Asia, as well as the earliest-diverging Asian member of the group.

== Classification ==
In their phylogenetic analysis, Wang et al. (2025) recovered Wudingloong as an early-diverging member of the sauropodomorph clade Massopoda, in a clade also containing Plateosauravus and Ruehleia as sister taxa. These results are displayed in the cladogram below:

- Massopoda
  - - Macrocollum
    - Musankwa
    - Pradhania
  - - - Wudingloong
      - - Plateosauravus
        - Ruehleia
    - - Anchisaurus
      - - Massospondylidae
        - - - Qianlong
            - Yunnanosaurus
          - - Xingxiulong
            - - - Jingshanosaurus
                - Seitaad
              - - Sauropodiformes
