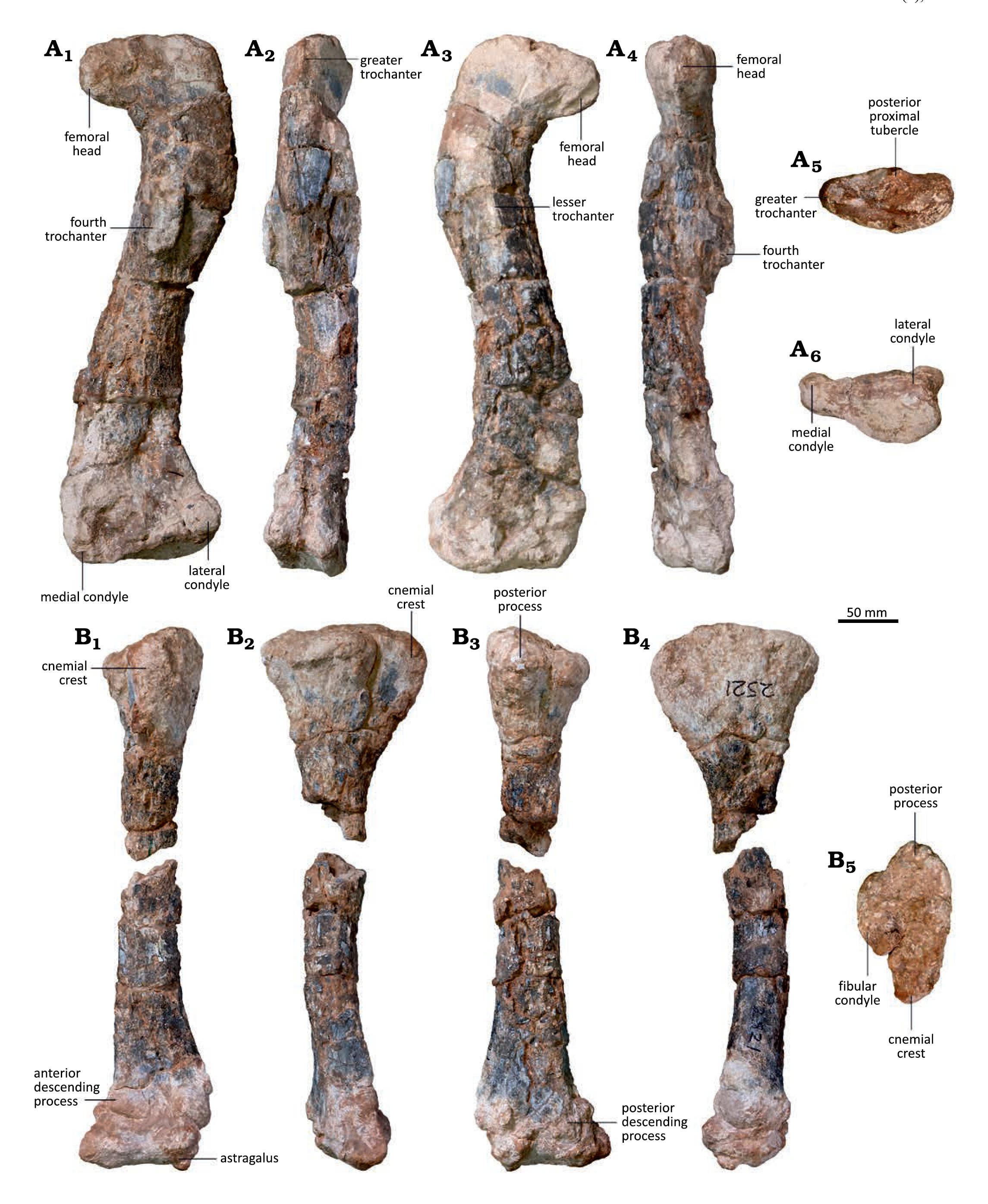
- Holotype femur (A) and tibia with astragalus (B)

Scientific classification
- Kingdom: Animalia
- Phylum: Chordata
- Class: Reptilia
- Clade: Dinosauria
- Clade: Saurischia
- Clade: †Sauropodomorpha
- Clade: †Massopoda
- Genus: †Musankwa; Barrett et al., 2024
- Species: †M. sanyatiensis

Binomial name
- †Musankwa sanyatiensis Barrett et al., 2024

= Musankwa =

Musankwa Temporal range: Triassic, Norian

Genus of sauropodomorph dinosaurs

Musankwa is an extinct genus of massopodan sauropodomorph dinosaurs from the Late Triassic (Norian) Pebbly Arkose Formation of Zimbabwe. The genus contains a single species, Musankwa sanyatiensis, known from an incomplete hindlimb. Musankwa represents the fourth dinosaur genus to be named from Zimbabwe.

== Discovery and naming ==
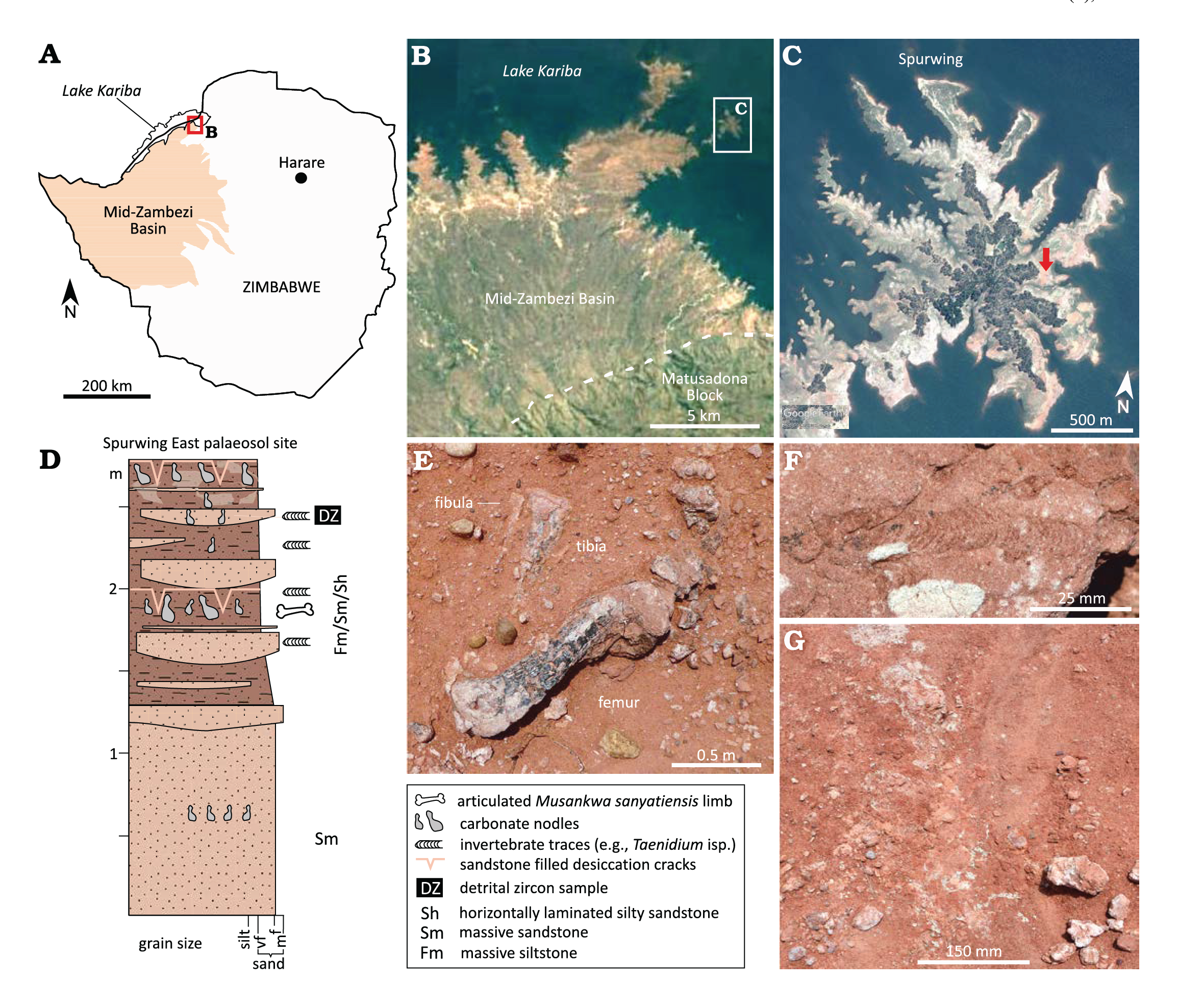
Geographical, stratigraphic, and sedimentological details of the Musankwa discovery, including the holotype in situ (E)

The Musankwa holotype specimen, NHMZ 2521, was discovered in March 2018 by Paul Barrett in sediments of the Pebbly Arkose Formation of the Upper Karoo Group (Spurwing East Palaeosol site) on the shoreline of Spurwing Island in Lake Kariba, Zimbabwe. The specimen consists of an articulated partial right leg, including the femur, tibia, and astragalus, in addition to associated unidentifiable bone fragments. A fragment of the distal end of the fibula was also found in the field but lost during collection and preparation before its description.

The Musankwa fossil material was mentioned in a 2020 review of the Upper Karoo Group's geology and paleontology, where it was preliminarily identified as belonging to a non-dinosaurian archosauromorph. The material later was then alluded to in a 2023 conference abstract as belonging to a Riojasaurus-like sauropodomorph, before its formal description the following year.

In 2024, Barrett and colleagues described Musankwa sanyatiensis as a new genus and species of basal sauropodomorph based on these fossil remains. The generic name, Musankwa, honors the house boat of the same name that served as the paleontologists' laboratory and home while conducting the fieldwork during which the holotype was found. "Musankwa" is a Tonga word meaning "boy close to marriage". The specific name, sanyatiensis, references the Sanyati River which flows into Lake Kariba near the type locality.

Musankwa is the fourth genus of dinosaurs to be named from Zimbabwe, following "Syntarsus" rhodesiensis in 1969, Vulcanodon in 1972, and Mbiresaurus in 2022.

== Description ==
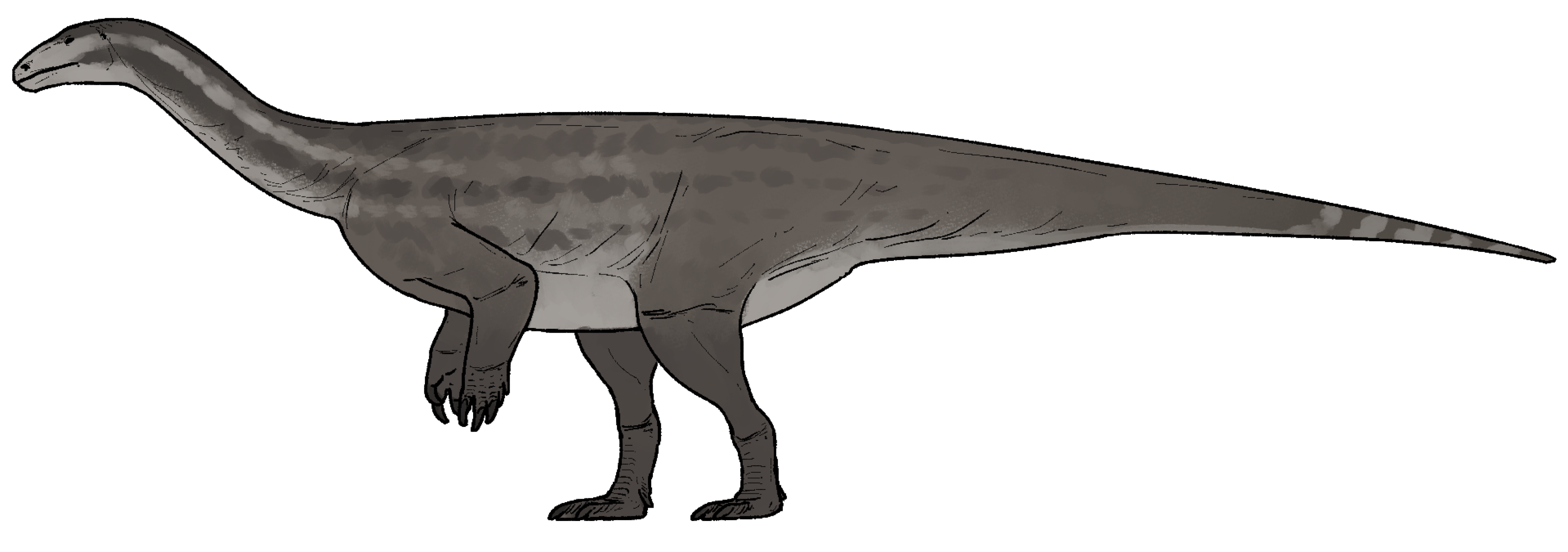
Speculative life restoration

Reconstructed skeleton

Based on more complete relatives, Musankwa was likely an obligate biped. As such, the body mass of the holotype individual was calculated at about 386 kilograms (851 lb).

== Classification ==
In their phylogenetic analyses using the phylogenetic matrix of Pol et al. (2021), Barrett et al. (2024) recovered Musankwa as the basalmost member of the sauropodomorph clade Massopoda, with the Riojasauridae found to be the next diverging clade. Their results are displayed in the cladogram below:

- Massopoda
  - Musankwa
  - - Riojasauridae
      - Eucnemesaurus spp.
      - Riojasaurus
    - - Sarahsaurus
      - - Massospondylidae
          - Ngwevu
          - - - Massospondylus carinatus
              - - Leyesaurus
                - Adeopapposaurus
            - - Coloradisaurus
              - - Lufengosaurus
                - Glacialisaurus
        - - Yunnanosaurus huangi
          - - - Xingxiulong
              - - Chuxiongosaurus
                - Jingshanosaurus
            - - Sauropodiformes

In 2025, Lania, Pabst & Scheyer included Musankwa in the phylogenetic matrix of Ezcurra et al. (2024) when testing the affinities of a new massopodan sauropodomorph from the Klettgau Formation of Switzerland. These results placed Musankwa within the Unaysauridae in an unresolved polytomy with Jaklapallisaurus, Macrocollum, and Unaysaurus outside of the Massopoda. The authors noted this discrepancy in its phylogenetic position in comparison to the results of Barrett et al. (2024). Depending on if anatomical characters were excluded from the analysis, Seitaad (and potentially the new Swiss taxon) was instead found to be the basalmost massopodan, followed by the Riojasauridae.

A later 2025 paper describing the new Chinese massopodan Wudingloong used the phylogenetic matrix of McPhee et al. (2020) to test the relationships of early sauropodomorphs including Musankwa. Like Barrett et al. (2024), this analysis recovered Musankwa in a basal massopodan position, albeit in a polytomous clade also including Macrocollum and Pradhania
