= Nambalia =

Nambalia Temporal range: late Norian–earliest Rhaetian ~203 Ma

Scientific classification
- Kingdom: Animalia
- Phylum: Chordata
- Class: Reptilia
- Clade: Dinosauria
- Clade: Saurischia
- Clade: †Sauropodomorpha
- Clade: †Bagualosauria
- Genus: †Nambalia; Novas et al. 2011

Species
- †Nambalia roychowdhurii Novas et al. 2011 (type)

Extinct genus of dinosaurs

Nambalia is a genus of basal sauropodomorph dinosaur. It lived during the Late Triassic period (late Norian to earliest Rhaetian) in what is now Telangana, central India. It is known from the holotype ISI R273, parts 1–3, partially articulated postcranial material and from the paratypes ISI R273, parts 4-29, including partial postcrania of at least two individuals of different sizes found closely associated and one of them is nearly the same size as the holotype.

== Discovery and naming ==
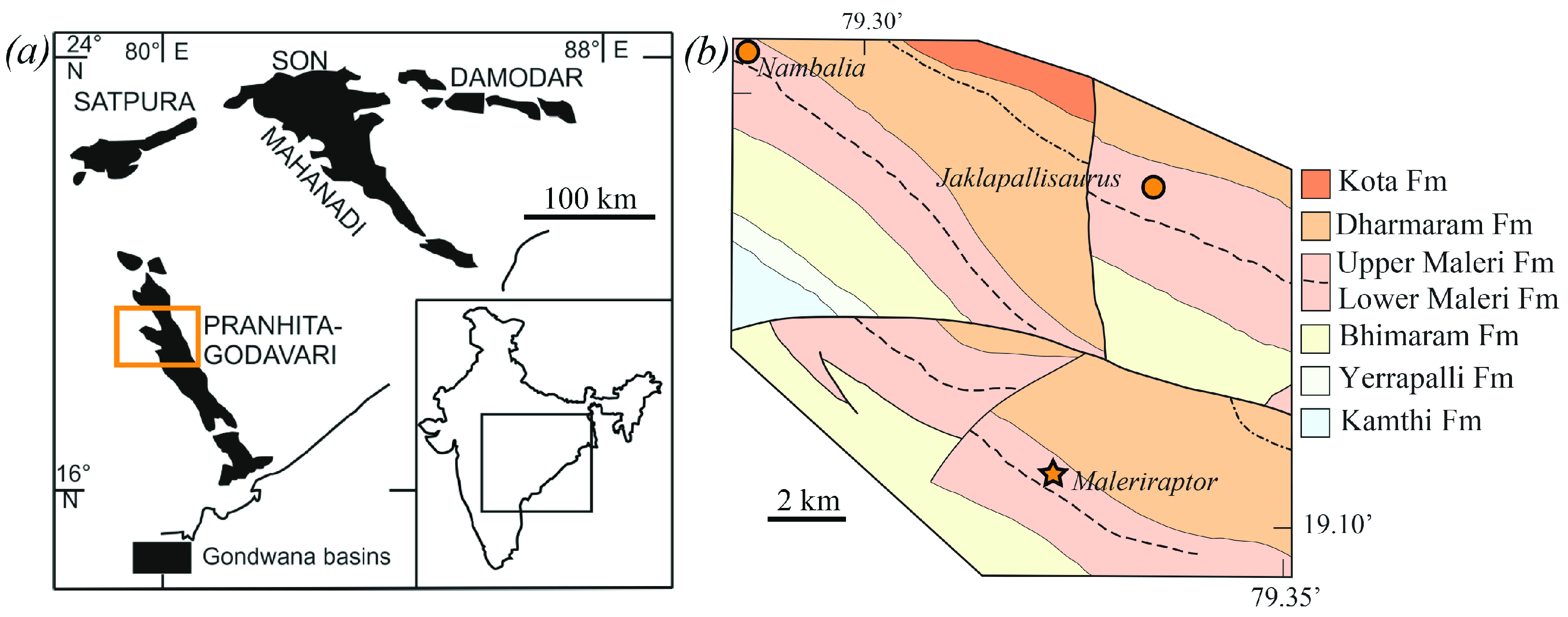
Type locality (a) and stratigraphic occurrence (b) of Nambalia

ISI R273 was discovered and collected from the Upper Maleri Formation within the Pranhita–Godavari Basin, north of Nambal village. It was first named by Fernando E. Novas, Martin D. Ezcurra, Sankar Chatterjee and T. S. Kutty in 2011 and the type species is Nambalia roychowdhurii. The generic name is derived from the Indian village of Nambal which is close to the type locality. The specific name honors Dr. Roy Chowdhuri, for his research on the Triassic vertebrate faunas of India.

== Classification ==
A cladistic analysis by Novas et al. found that Nambalia is basal to Efraasia, Plateosauravus, Ruehleia and Plateosauria, but more derived than Thecodontosaurus, Pantydraco, and Guaibasauridae. Nambalia was found along with the plateosaurid Jaklapallisaurus, a guaibasaurid, and two basal dinosauriforms.
