= Walkeria uva =

Scientific classification
- Kingdom: Animalia
- Phylum: Bryozoa
- Class: Gymnolaemata
- Order: Ctenostomatida
- Family: Walkeriidae
- Genus: Walkeria
- Species: W. uva

Binomial name
- Walkeria uva (Linnaeus, 1758)

Synonyms
- Sertularia uva Linnaeus, 1758; Valkeria uva (Linnaeus, 1758)

Species of moss animal

Walkeria uva is a species of colonial bryozoan in the order Ctenostomatida. It occurs on either side of the Atlantic Ocean, in the Baltic Sea, in the Mediterranean Sea and in the Indo-Pacific region.

== Description ==
Walkeria uva is a colonial bryozoan that has thread-like stolons that creep across the substrate from which small clusters of zooids grow. The zooids have no stalks and are ovoid or tubular, growing direct from the stolon which seldom branches. There are up to ten zooids in each group, and the zooids are tipped by a bulge from which a pair of short lateral branches grow at right-angles. The whole colony is only about 2 to 4 cm (0.8 to 1.6 in) across. The colour is light beige or pale grey. The colonies are so small and inconspicuous that they may only be discovered by chance when the seaweed on which they are growing is examined in the laboratory.

== Distribution and habitat ==
Walkeria uva occurs on either side of the Atlantic Ocean, in the Baltic Sea, the Mediterranean Sea, the Indian Ocean and the South China Sea. It is one of a number of creeping and low-growing bryozoans that are common on hard substrates in the lower tidal and shallow subtidal zones. It often grows on red or brown algae, such as Cystoseira, Corallina officinalis and Halidrys siliquosa or on other bryozoans, and is often associated with Bowerbankia spp.. There are two forms, one is more erect and is found near the tip of algal fronds in habitats where there is little sediment, and the other is more prostrate, and found on various red or brown algae fronds in muddy habitats. It is possible that these two forms are in fact different species.

== Ecology ==
Like other bryozoans, Walkeria uva has a crown of eight tentacles called a lophophore which can be extended to catch phytoplankton, bacteria and other minute particles floating past. Cilia on the tentacles actively move the water around to promote feeding. The colony grows by the budding of new zooids at the tips of the stolons. The colony is hermaphrodite; male zooids liberate sperm into the water which the female zooids draw in, retaining their eggs and brooding the embryos. When sufficiently developed the larvae are discharged into the water column, and after a short planktonic phase, settle on a suitable substrate and undergo metamorphosis into primary or ancestral zooids. This bryozoan has an overwintering, spherical form that develops in the autumn, and returns to normal growth when the water warms up in the following spring.
