= Upper Maleri Formation =

Geologic formation in India

- Stratigraphic range: Late Triassic (Norian); ~220–211 Ma
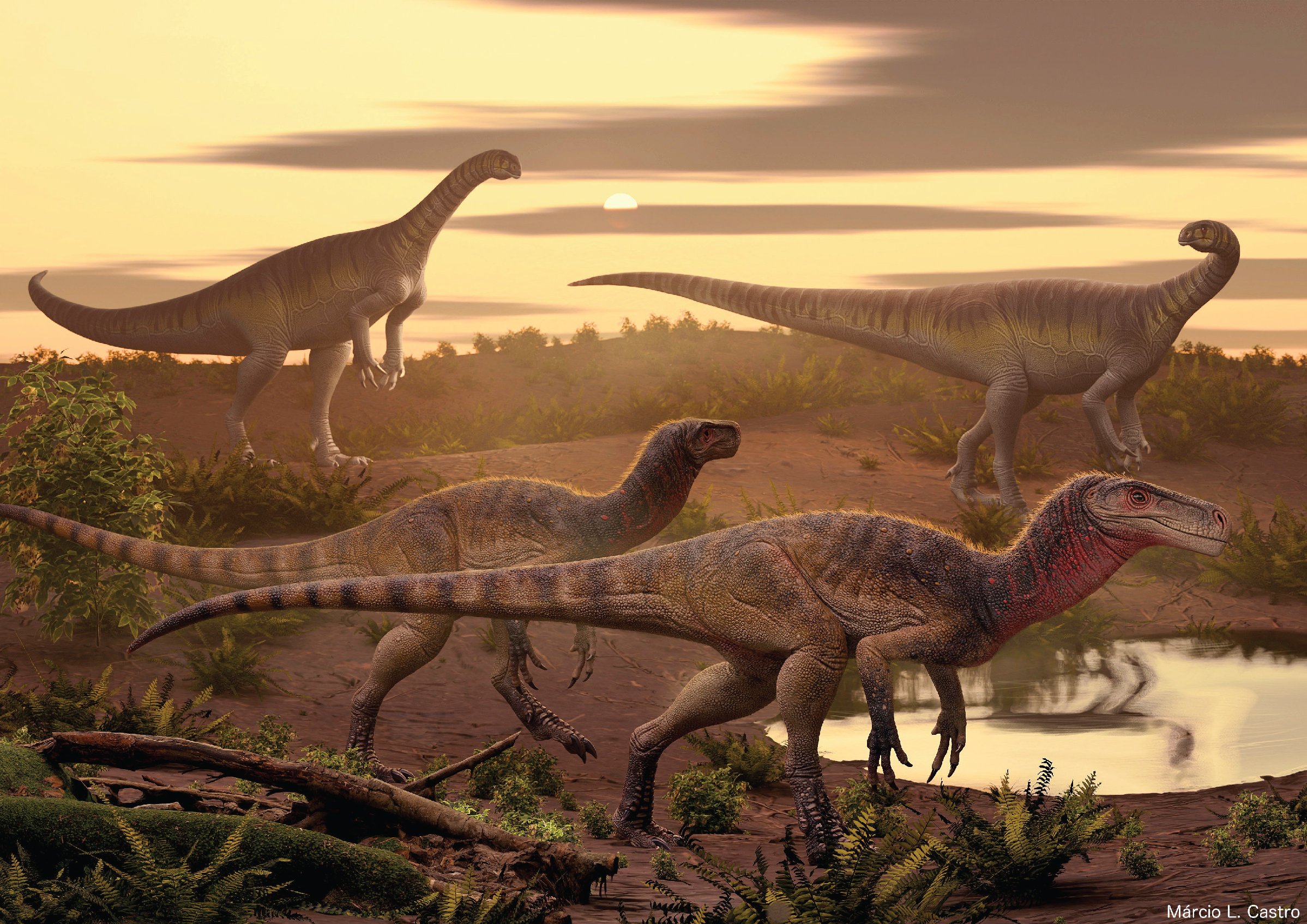
- Artistic reconstruction of the Upper Maleri Formation paleoenvironment
- Type: Geological formation
- Unit of: Gondwana Group
- Underlies: Lower Dharmaram Formation
- Overlies: Lower Maleri Formation

Location
- Coordinates: 19.3°N 79.5°E
- Approximate paleocoordinates: 33.1°S 36.4°E
- Region: Telangana
- Country: India
- Extent: Pranhita–Godavari Basin
- Upper Maleri Formation (India)

The Upper Maleri Formation is a sedimentary rock formation found in Telangana, India. It is one of the formations of the Pranhita–Godavari Basin. It is of late Norian and possibly earliest Rhaetian ages (Late Triassic), and is notable for its fossils of early dinosaurs.

== Paleobiota ==
Color key: Taxon / Reclassified taxon / Taxon falsely reported as present / Dubious taxon or junior synonym / Ichnotaxon / Ootaxon / Morphotaxon

Notes
Uncertain or tentative taxa are in small text
~~crossed out~~ taxa are discredited.

=== Dinosauriformes ===
Dinosauriforms of the Upper Maleri Formation
| Genus | Species | Location | Material | Clade | Image |
|---|---|---|---|---|---|
| Jaklapallisaurus | J. assymetrica | Telangana | ISI R274, postcranial material. | Sauropodomorpha, Unaysauridae | |
| Nambalia | N. roychowdhurii | Telangana | ISI R273, including partial postcrania of at least three individuals of different sizes found closely associated. | Sauropodomorpha, Bagualosauria | |
| Maleriraptor(Formerly Dinosauriformes sp. indet. A) | M. kuttyi | Pranhita-Godavari Valley | ISI R282, partial sacral ribs, vertebrae, and pelvic girdle. | Saurischia, Herrerasauria | |
| Dinosauriformes indet. | sp. indet. B | Pranhita-Godavari Valley | ISI R284, right ilium | Dinosauriformes, incertae sedis | |
| Guaibasauridae indet. | sp. indet. | Pranhita-Godavari Valley | ISI R277/1–5 & 7–8, vertebrae, hip, and hindlimb material, specimens. | Sauropodomorpha, Guaibasauridae | |

=== Other amniotes ===
Phytosaur fossils are known from the formation, including forms similar to Angistorhinus and Leptosuchus. Indeterminate aetosaurs and dicynodonts have also been reported.

Non-dinosaur Amniotes of the Upper Maleri Formation
| Genus | Species | Location | Material | Clade | Image |
|---|---|---|---|---|---|
| Ischigualastia | cf. I. sp. | | | Kannemeyeriiformes, Stahleckeriidae | |
| Kranosaura | K. kuttyi | | ISIR 269, a partial skull | Protopyknosia, incertae sedis | |
| Primisuchus | P. gillettei | | | Parasuchidae, Leptosuchomorpha | |
| Aetosauria indet. | sp. indet. | | | Aetosauria, incertae sedis | |

=== Temnospondyli ===
Temnospondyls of the Upper Maleri Formation
| Genus | Species | Location | Material | Clade | Image |
|---|---|---|---|---|---|
| Compsocerops | C. cosgriffi | | | Brachyopoidea, Chigutisauridae | |
| Kuttycephalus | K. triangularis | | | Brachyopoidea, Chigutisauridae | |

=== Fish ===
Fishes of the Upper Maleri Formation
| Genus | Species | Location | Material | Clade | Image |
|---|---|---|---|---|---|
| Xenacanthus | X. indicus | | | Xenacanthiformes, Xenacanthidae | |
| Ferganoceratodus | F. hislopianus | | | Ceratodontiformes, incertae sedis | |

== Correlations ==
The formation has been correlated with the Forest Sandstone of Africa, the lower Caturrita Formation of the Paraná Basin in Brazil, the upper Ischigualasto Formation and lower Los Colorados Formation of the Ischigualasto-Villa Unión Basin of Argentina, and the Chinle Formation of North America.

== See also ==
- List of dinosaur-bearing rock formations
