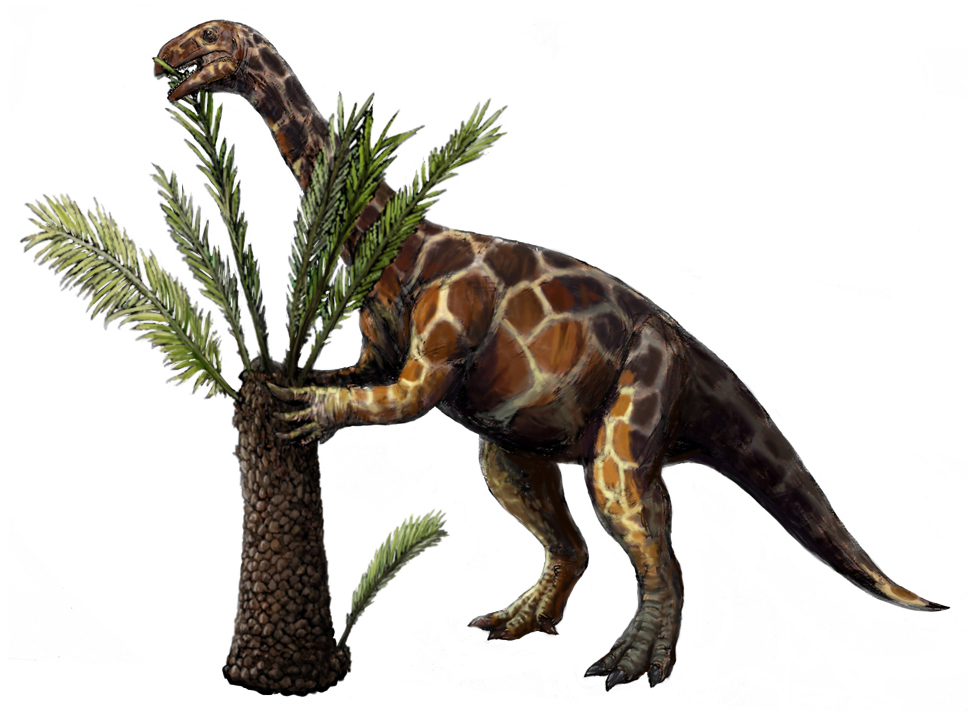
- Restoration of Unaysaurus

Scientific classification
- Kingdom: Animalia
- Phylum: Chordata
- Class: Reptilia
- Clade: Dinosauria
- Clade: Saurischia
- Clade: †Sauropodomorpha
- Clade: †Bagualosauria
- Clade: †Unaysauridae; Müller et al., 2018

Genera
- †Jaklapallisaurus; †Macrocollum; †Musango; †Unaysaurus

= Unaysauridae =

Unaysaurids Temporal range: Late Triassic, 225–209 Ma

Extinct clade of dinosaurs

Unaysauridae is a clade of basal sauropodomorphs from the Late Triassic of Brazil, India, and Zimbabwe.

== Diagnosis and systematics ==
Unaysauridae was defined by Müller et al. (2018) as the most inclusive clade including Unaysaurus tolentinoi, but not Plateosaurus engelhardti nor Saltasaurus loricatus.

Members of Unaysauridae are diagnosed by a substantially expanded cranial part of the medial condyle of the astragalus, as well as a promaxillary fenestra. Unaysauridae is sister to Plateosauria, more derived than Nambalia, Thecodontosaurus ISI R277, Pantydraco, and Efraasia. Unaysaurus and Jaklapallisaurus had previously been assigned to Plateosauridae by prior authors. However, Beccari et al. (2021) questioned the validity of Unaysauridae in their description of Issi saaneq because it "suffers from the missing data and fragmentary nature of specimens. For example, one synapomorphy of unaysaurids is related to the astragalus medial end length ratio to the anteroposterior length of the lateral end, a which has not been confirmed in U. tolentinoi, whereas a second synapomorphy, the presence of a promaxillary fenestra, cannot be observed in J. asymmetrica which lacks the required cranial remains." Subsequently, their phylogenetic analysis recovered Unaysaurus and Macrocollum within Plateosauridae.
