= Jaklapallisaurus =

Jaklapallisaurus Temporal range: Late Triassic, 203 Ma

Scientific classification
- Kingdom: Animalia
- Phylum: Chordata
- Class: Reptilia
- Clade: Dinosauria
- Clade: Saurischia
- Clade: †Sauropodomorpha
- Clade: †Unaysauridae
- Genus: †Jaklapallisaurus; Novas et al., 2011
- Species: †J. asymmetricus

Binomial name
- †Jaklapallisaurus asymmetricus Novas et al., 2011

Extinct genus of dinosaurs

Jaklapallisaurus is a genus of unaysaurid sauropodomorph dinosaur. It lived during the Late Triassic period (late Norian to earliest Rhaetian) in what is now Telangana, central India. The genus is monotypic, only including the species Jaklapallisaurus asymmetricus.

== Discovery and naming ==
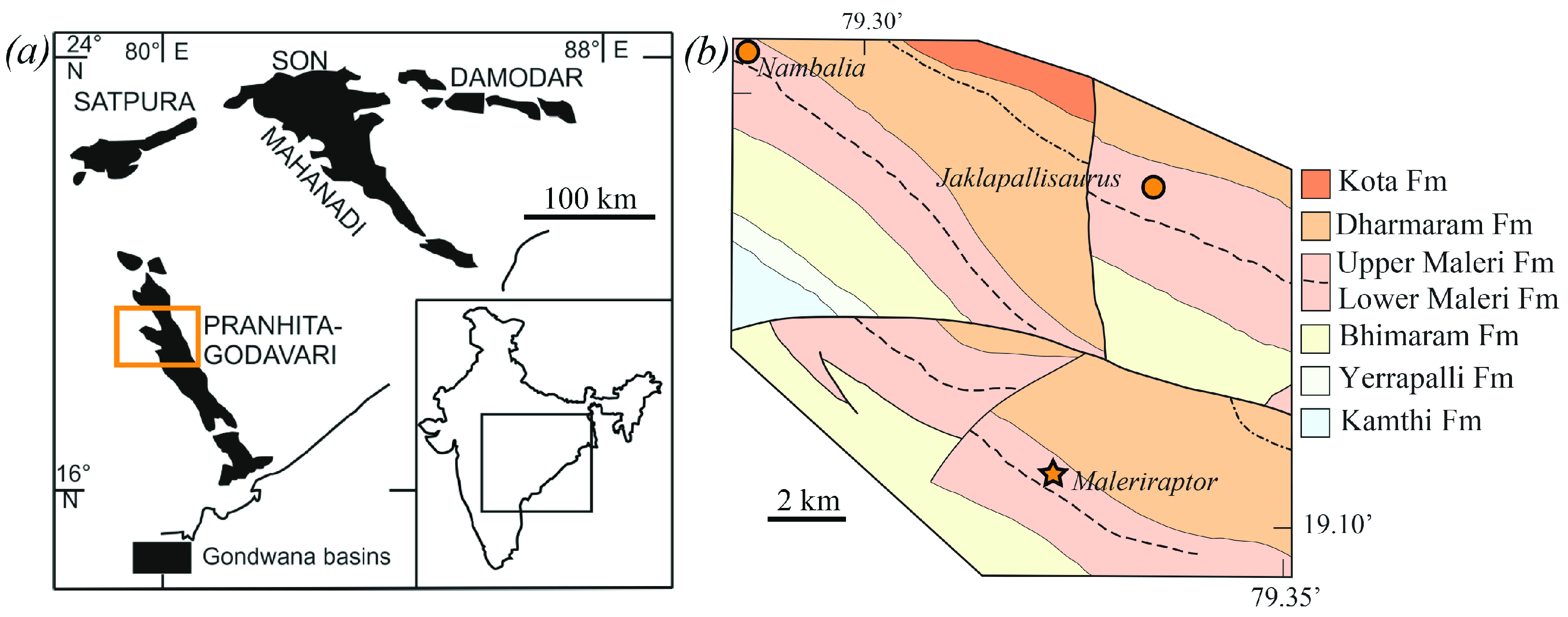
Type locality (a) and stratigraphic occurrence (b) of Jaklapallisaurus

The Jaklapallisaurus holotype specimen, ISI R274, consists of postcranial material which was collected from the Upper Maleri Formation (late Norian–earliest Rhaetian) of the Pranhita–Godavari Basin. The specimen includes a probable anterior dorsal vertebra, an anterior caudal vertebra, and right distal end of femur, tibia, astragalus, metatarsals I IV, and pedal phalanges I-1 and II-1. It was first named by Fernando E. Novas, Martin D. Ezcurra, Sankar Chatterjee and Tharavat S. Kutty in 2011. The type species is Jaklapallisaurus asymmetrica. ISI R279, a partially complete right femur which was collected from the Lower Dharmaram Formation (latest Norian–Rhaetian) was originally referred to Jaklapallisaurus. However, later research proved that the referral is based on weak grounds, and the presence of the species in that stratigraphic unit should be based on a more taxonomically informative specimen.

The generic name is derived from the Indian town of Jaklapalli which is close to the type locality. The specific name refers to the highly asymmetrical astragalus of this species in distal view.

In 2023, the ending of the Latinized specific epithet was changed from the female "asymmetrica" to the masculine "asymmetricus" because the ending of the Latinized genus Jakalapallisaurus is masculine. This modification is based on the Article 34 of the International Code of Zoological Nomenclature. The Jaklapallisaurus fossil material was found along with the guaibasaurid sauropodomorph Nambalia and two basal dinosauriforms.

== Classification ==
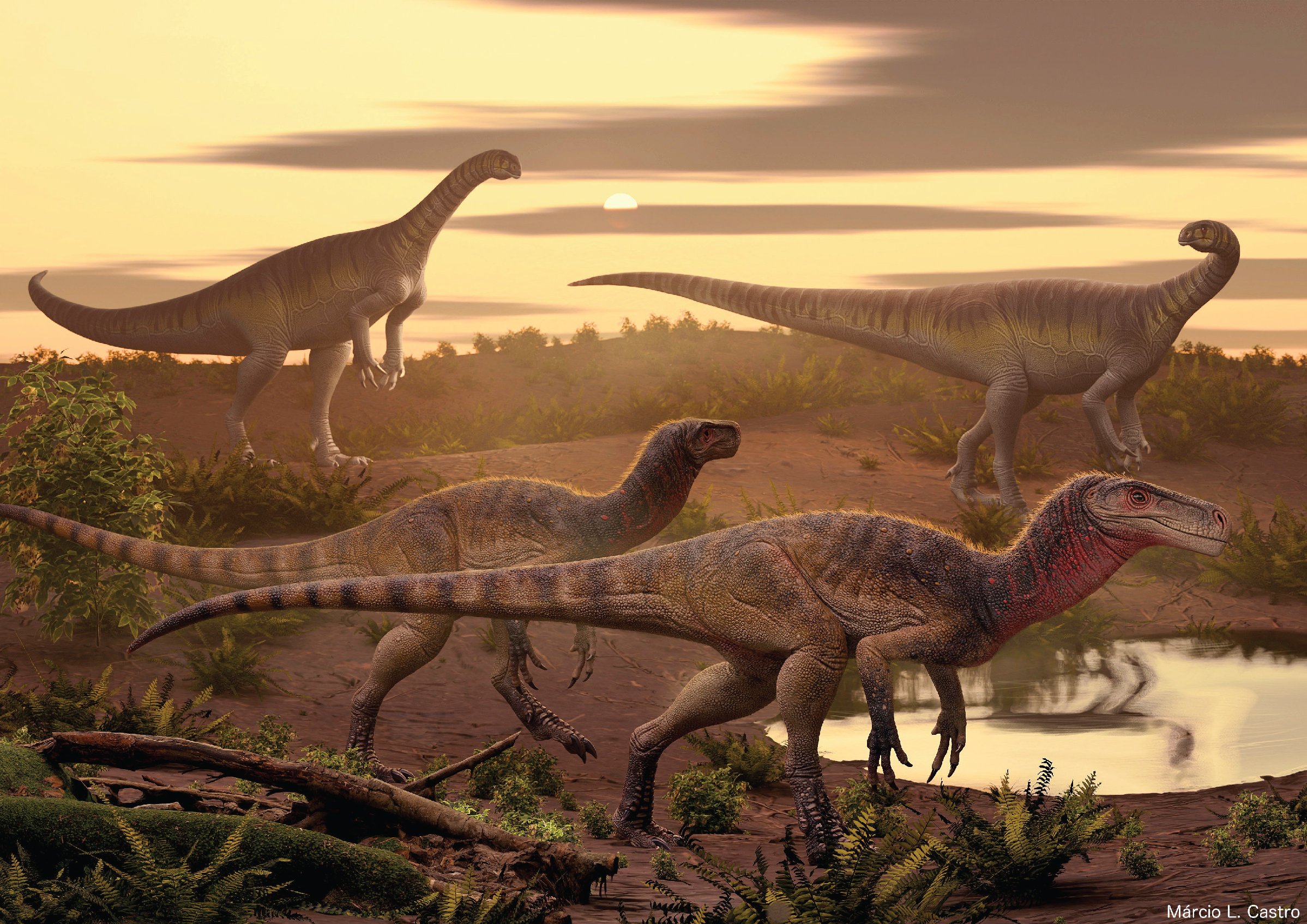
Speculative life restoration of Jaklapallisaurus and the coeval herrerasaur Maleriraptor in their environment

In their 2023 description of the osteology of Jaklapallisaurus, Ezcurra et al. performed a phylogenetic analysis of bagualosaurians, recovering it as the sister taxon to Macrocollum, in a clade also containing Unaysaurus, called Unaysauridae. The results of their analysis are shown in the cladogram below:

- - Bagualosaurus
  - - - Pantydraco
      - Thecodontosaurus
    - - Nambalia
      - Arcusaurus
      - - Efraasia
        - - - Ruehleia
            - Plateosauravus
          - Plateosauria
            - - Plateosauridae
                - Issi
                - - Plateosaurus trossingensis
                  - Plateosaurus gracilis
              - Unaysauridae
                - Unaysaurus
                - - Macrocollum
                  - Jaklapallisaurus
            - Massopoda
