= Lower Maleri Formation =

Geologic formation in India

- Stratigraphic range: Late Carnian–early Norian
- Type: Geological formation
- Unit of: Gondwana Group
- Underlies: Upper Maleri Formation
- Overlies: Basement

Location
- Coordinates: 19.2°N 79.7°E
- Approximate paleocoordinates: 36.4°S 38.2°E
- Region: Andhra Pradesh & Telangana
- Country: India
- Extent: Pranhita–Godavari Basin
- Lower Maleri Formation (India)

The Lower Maleri Formation is a sedimentary rock formation found in Andhra Pradesh and Telangana, India. It is the lowermost member of the Pranhita–Godavari Basin. It is of late Carnian to early Norian age (Upper Triassic), and is notable for its fossils of early archosaurs.

== Vertebrate fauna ==
cf. Angistorhinus and cf. Typothorax have also been recovered from it.

Vertebrates from the Lower Maleri Formation
| Genus | Species | Location | Stratigraphic position | Material | Notes | Images |
|---|---|---|---|---|---|---|
| Alickmeron | A. maleriensis | | | Partial distal femur | An objective junior synonym of Alwalkeria maleriensis | |
| Alwalkeria | A. maleriensis | Andhra Pradesh | | "Partial skull and postcranial remains." | An avemetatarsalian | |
| Panthasaurus | P. maleriensis | | | | A temnospondyl | |
| Exaeretodon | E. statisticae | | | | | |
| Hyperodapedon | H. huxleyi | | | | | |
| Malerisaurus | M. robinsonae | | | | | |
| Massospondylus | M. hislopi | Andhra Pradesh | | "Isolated vertebrae." | Later found to be indeterminate prosauropod remains | |
| Parasuchus | P. hislopi | | | | A parasuchid phytosaur. | |
| Plateosaurus | Indeterminate | Andhra Pradesh | | | Later found to be indeterminate prosauropod remains | |

| Color key: Taxon / Reclassified taxon / Taxon falsely reported as present / Dubious taxon or junior synonym / Ichnotaxon / Ootaxon / Morphotaxon | Notes; Uncertain or tentative taxa are in small text; ~~crossed out~~ taxa are discredited. |

== Correlations ==
The formation has been correlated with the Molteno Formation (Karoo Basin) and Pebbly Arkose Formation of Africa, the Santa Maria Formation of the Paraná Basin in Brazil, the Ischigualasto Formation of the Ischigualasto-Villa Unión Basin of Argentina and the lowermost Chinle Formation of North America.

== See also ==
- List of dinosaur-bearing rock formations
