= Walkeria =

Scientific classification
- Kingdom: Animalia
- Phylum: Bryozoa
- Class: Gymnolaemata
- Order: Ctenostomatida
- Family: Walkeriidae
- Genus: Walkeria; Fleming, 1823

Species
- 4 species (see text)

Genus of bryozoans

Walkeria is a genus of colonial bryozoans in the order Ctenostomatida.

== Species ==
The World Register of Marine Species includes these species in the genus:

- W. atlantica (Busk, 1886)
- W. prorepens Kubanin, 1992
- W. tuberosa Heller, 1867
- W. uva (Linnaeus, 1758)
