= Pranhita–Godavari Basin =

Coordinates: 18°N 80°E

The Pranhita–Godavari Basin is a northwest–southeast striking geological structural basin (rift basin) in central India. The basin contains up to 7 kilometres of sedimentary strata of late Carboniferous/Early Permian to Cretaceous age. The basin is 400 km in length with a width of about 100 km and is terminated by the coast of the Indian Ocean on the southeast end.

The Late Permian aged Kundaram Formation has provided a terrestrial vertebrate fauna. The Late Triassic and the Early Jurassic strata in the basin host dinosaur fossils. The Pranhita–Godavari Basin contains four Triassic–Jurassic formations, namely Lower Maleri, Upper Maleri, Lower Dharmaram and Upper Dharmaram.

== See also ==
- List of dinosaur-bearing rock formations
