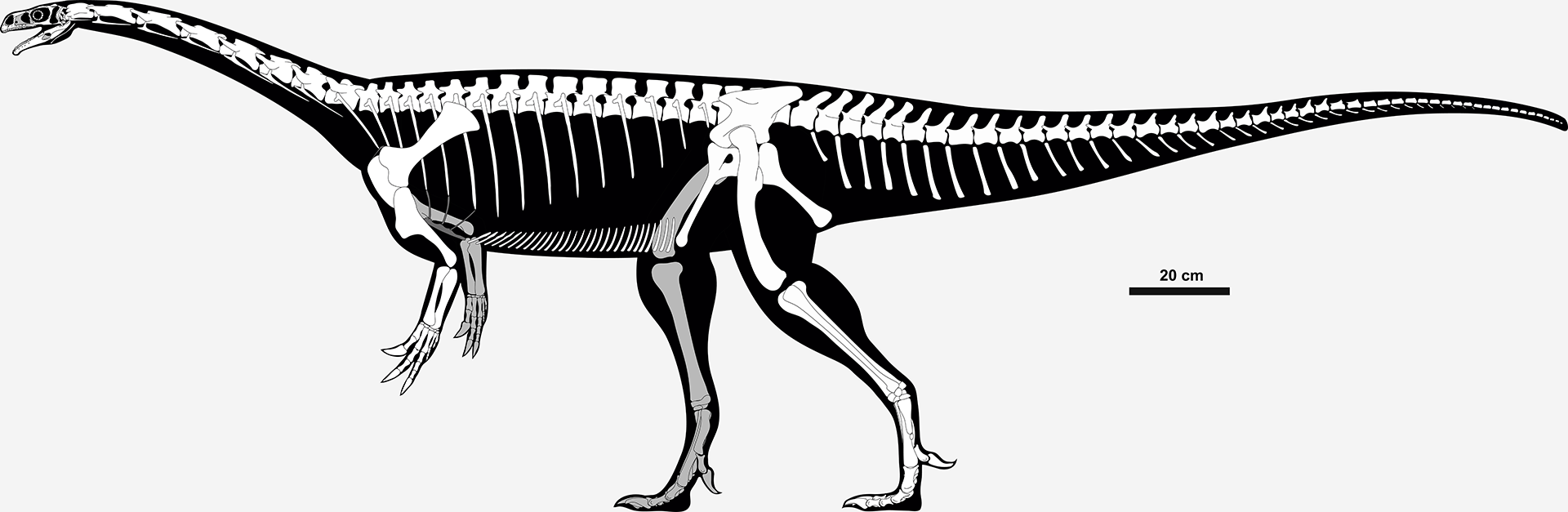
- Skeletal reconstruction of Macrocollum itaquii. Known elements in white and unknown in dark gray

Scientific classification
- Kingdom: Animalia
- Phylum: Chordata
- Class: Reptilia
- Clade: Dinosauria
- Clade: Saurischia
- Clade: †Sauropodomorpha
- Clade: †Unaysauridae
- Genus: †Macrocollum; Müller et al., 2018
- Species: †M. itaquii

Binomial name
- †Macrocollum itaquii Müller et al., 2018

= Macrocollum =

Macrocollum Temporal range: Late Triassic, 225 Ma

Extinct genus of dinosaurs

Macrocollum is a genus of unaysaurid sauropodomorph dinosaur that lived during the Late Triassic period (early Norian) in what is now Brazil. It is one of the oldest dinosaurs known.

== Discovery and naming ==
Macrocollum was discovered in 2012 in Rio Grande do Sul, Brazil, at the Wachholz site of the Candelária Formation, Paraná Basin. It was announced in a press conference on November 21, 2018. The generic name combines the Greek word μακρός (long) and the Latin word collum (neck), referring to the animal's elongated neck. The specific epithet honours José Jerundino Machado Itaqui, one of the main persons behind the creation of CAPPA/UFSM.

== Description ==
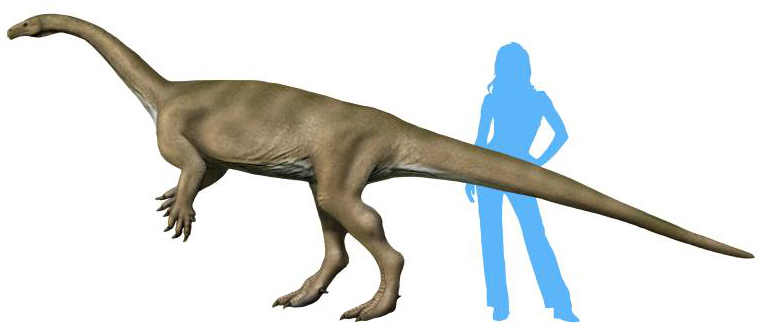
Size compared to a human

Like most early dinosaurs, Macrocollum was relatively small, and walked on two legs.

The known remains of Macrocollum are relatively well preserved. The holotype specimen consists of an almost complete and articulated skeleton. The two paratype specimens are both articulated skeletons with one missing a skull and its cervical series.

Evidence for an air sac system has been documented in the fossils, and is the oldest known dinosaur with this trait.

Macrocollum itaquii differs from all other known sauropodomorphs based on a unique combination of characters such as those found on the skull, which include an antorbital fossa perforated by a promaxillary fenestra, and a medial margin of the supratemporal fossa with a simple smooth curve at the frontal/parietal suture.

== Classification ==
Macrocollum, alongside Jaklapallisaurus and Unaysaurus, was found to belong to the clade Unaysauridae.

== Paleoecology ==
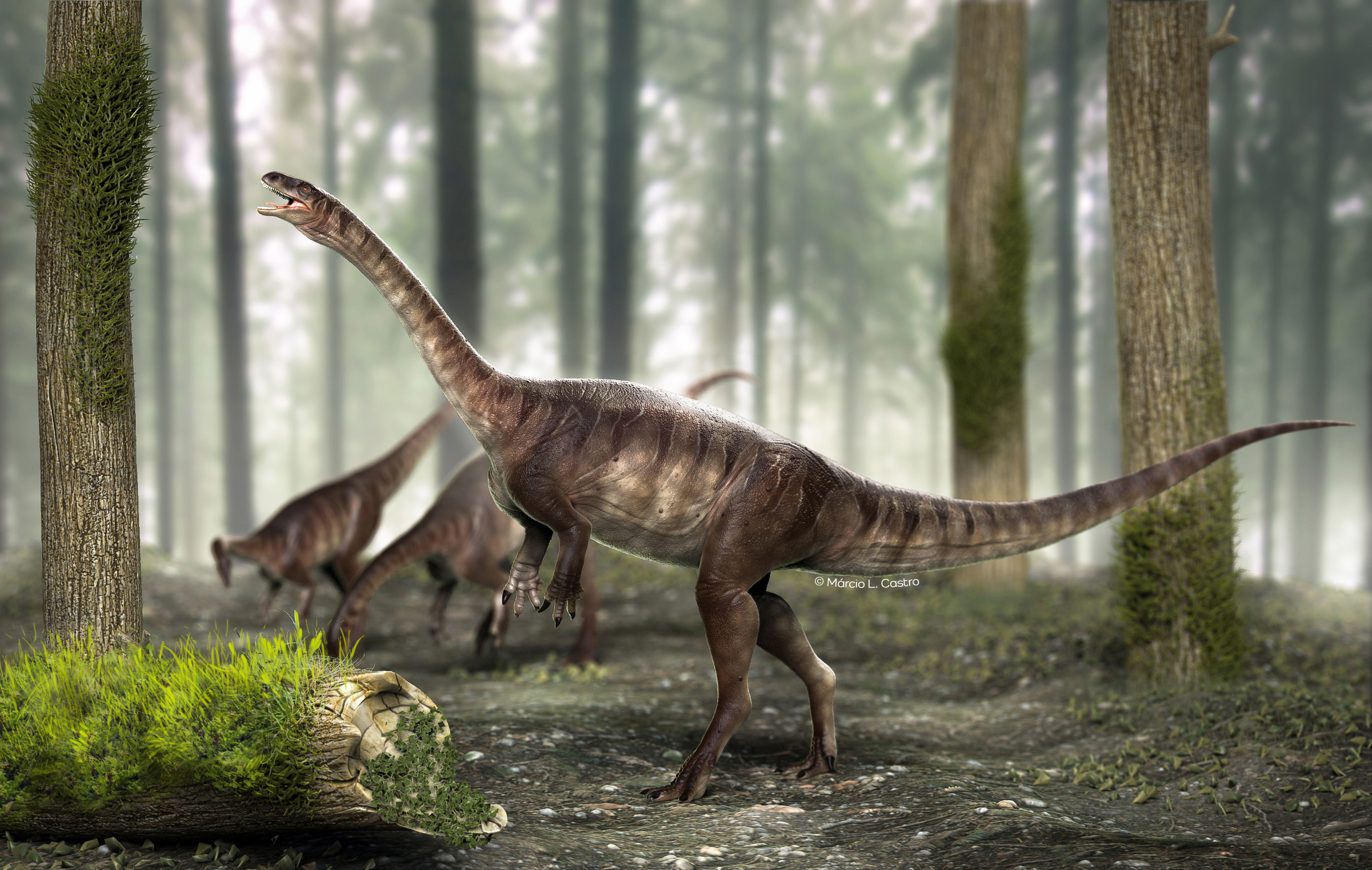
Restoration by Marcio L. Castro

Macrocollum lived between about 225.42 to 225 million years ago, in the Norian age of the late Triassic period. It was found in the south of Brazil, which at the time was connected to northwest Africa. At the time, most of the Earth's landmass was united into the supercontinent Pangaea, which was just starting to divide into Laurasia in the north, and Gondwana in the south. U-Pb (Uranium decay) dating found that the Caturrita Formation, close to the holotype locality, dates to around 225.42 million years ago, making it fewer than 10 million years younger than the Santa Maria and Ischigualasto Formations, from where the earliest dinosaurs are known.

=== Taphonomy ===
The ilia of one of the paratypes of Macrocollum (CAPPA/UFSM 0001b) were used as a model in a study on the taphonomical effects of sedimentary compression on the iliac morphology of early sauropodomorphs.
