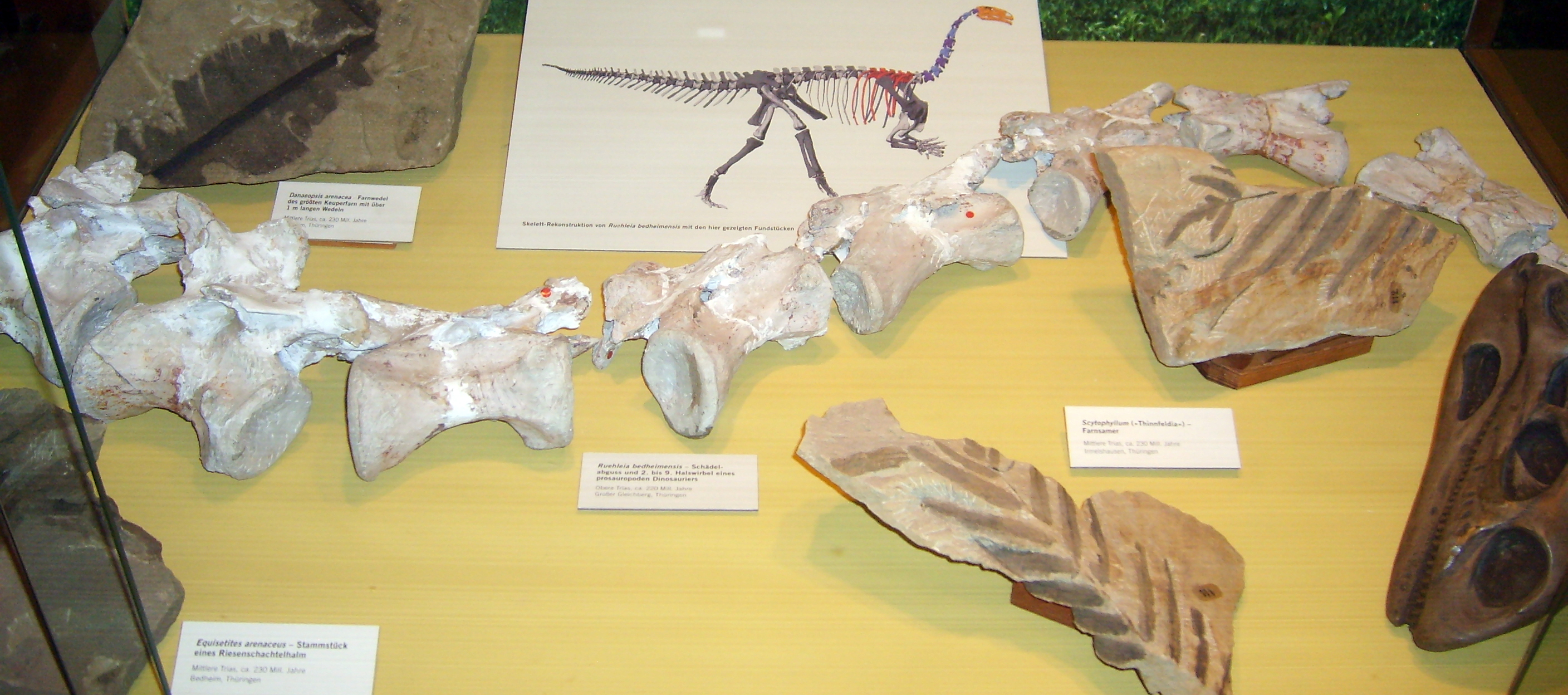
- Neck vertebrae, Naturkunde Museum, Berlin

Scientific classification
- Kingdom: Animalia
- Phylum: Chordata
- Class: Reptilia
- Clade: Dinosauria
- Clade: Saurischia
- Clade: †Sauropodomorpha
- Genus: †Ruehleia; Galton, 2001
- Species: †R. bedheimensis

Binomial name
- †Ruehleia bedheimensis Galton, 2001

= Ruehleia =

Ruehleia Temporal range: Norian ~216–208 Ma

Extinct genus of dinosaurs

Ruehleia is a genus of sauropodomorph dinosaur from the Late Triassic period of Germany. The type species is R. bedheimensis, described by Galton in 2001, and is named for the German paleontologist Hugo Rühle von Lilienstern. Discovered in 1952, the holotype consists of one nearly complete skeleton, including cervical (neck), dorsal (back), and caudal (tail) vertebrae; a partial sacrum; a scapulocoracoid; pelvic bones; most limb bones; and a partially complete manus (hands). The fossils were found in the Trossingen Formation of central Germany and date to the Norian stage, around 216 to 208 million years ago.

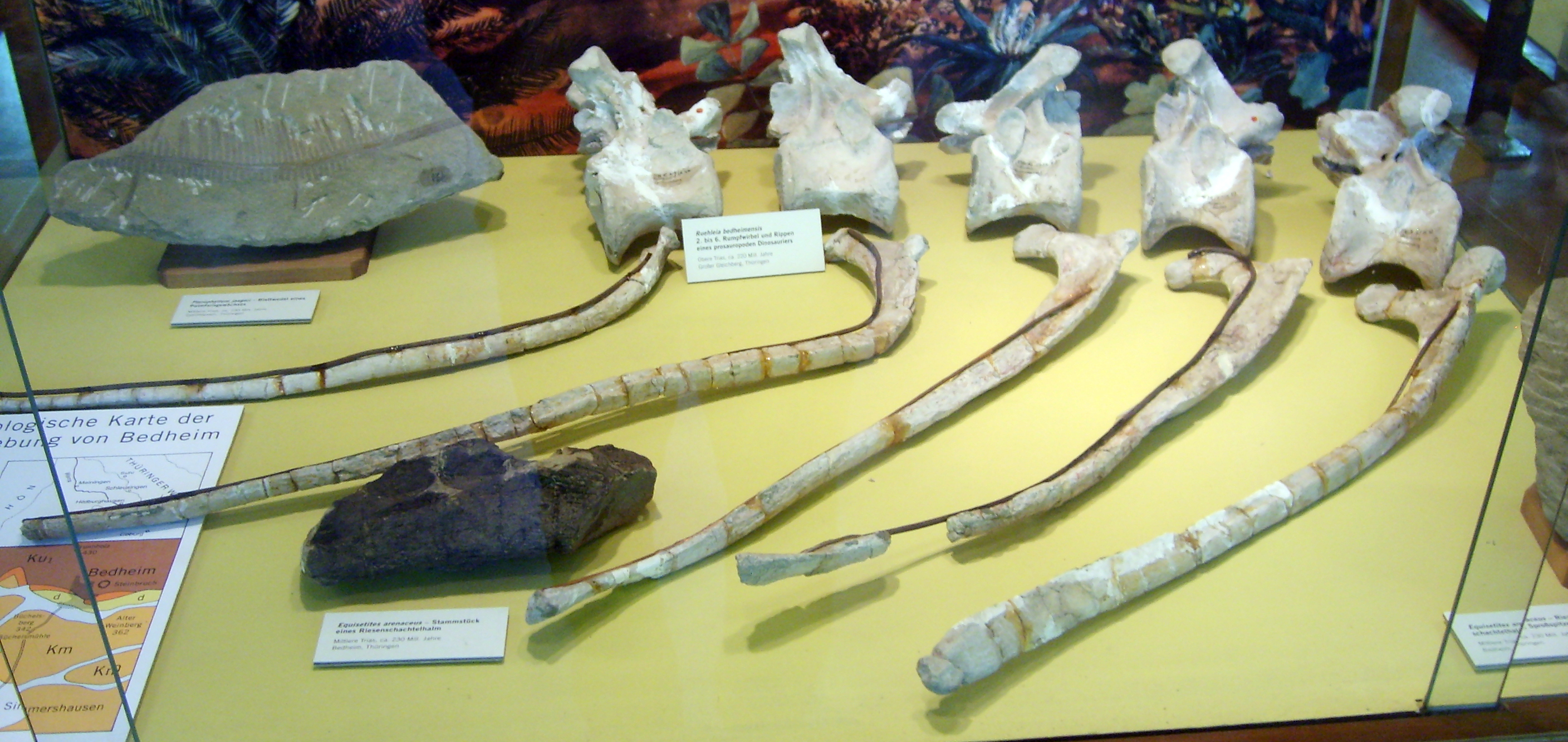
Vertebrae and ribs, Naturkunde Museum, Berlin
